= Herbert family =

British noble family

Herbert
- Noble family
- Herbert coat of arms
- Country: England; United Kingdom
- Founded: 1461; 565 years ago
- Founder: Baron Herbert of Raglan
- Titles: See list: Duke of Powis; Marquess of Powis; Earl of Powis; Earl of Montgomery; Earl of St Germans; Earl of Carnarvon; Earl of Torrington; Earl of Pembroke; Viscount Montgomery; Baron of Redcastle; Baron Powis; Baron Herbert; Baron Botetourt; Baron Herbert of Shurland; Baron Herbert of Cardiff; Baron Herbert of Chirbury; Baron Herbert of Lea
- Estates: See list: Highclere Castle; Wilton House; Powis Castle; Ludlow Castle; Raglan Castle; Oatlands Park; Powis House; Oakly Park; St Fagans Castle; Cardiff Castle

The Herbert family is an Anglo-Welsh noble family founded by William Herbert, known as "Black William", the son of William ap Thomas, founder of Raglan Castle, a follower of Edward IV of England in the Wars of the Roses. The name Herbert originated in 1461 when William was granted the title Baron Herbert of Raglan, having assumed an English-style surname in place of his Welsh patronymic, ap William.

== Notable members ==
- George Herbert, poet.
- Edward Herbert, 1st Baron Herbert of Chirbury, poet.
- William Herbert, 3rd Earl of Pembroke, founded Pembroke College, Oxford, and sponsored the printing of the First Folio of William Shakespeare's plays.
- Arthur Herbert, 1st Earl of Torrington, took the Invitation to William to The Hague, disguised as a simple sailor, and commanded William's invasion fleet during the Glorious Revolution which ousted James II.
- Philip Herbert, 4th Earl of Pembroke, Chancellor of the University of Oxford.
- George Herbert, 5th Earl of Carnarvon, financial backer of the search for and the excavation of Tutankhamun's tomb in the Valley of the Kings.

== Lineage ==
Arms of the Herbert Family, Per pale azure and gules, three lions rampant argent armed gules

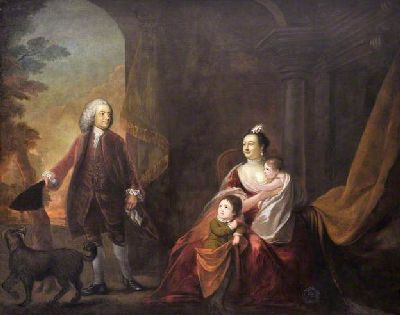
The Earl and Countess of Powis with their children, the future Earl and Countess of Powis, in 1760

- William ap Thomas
  - William Herbert, 1st Earl of Pembroke (died 1469)
    - William Herbert, 2nd Earl of Pembroke
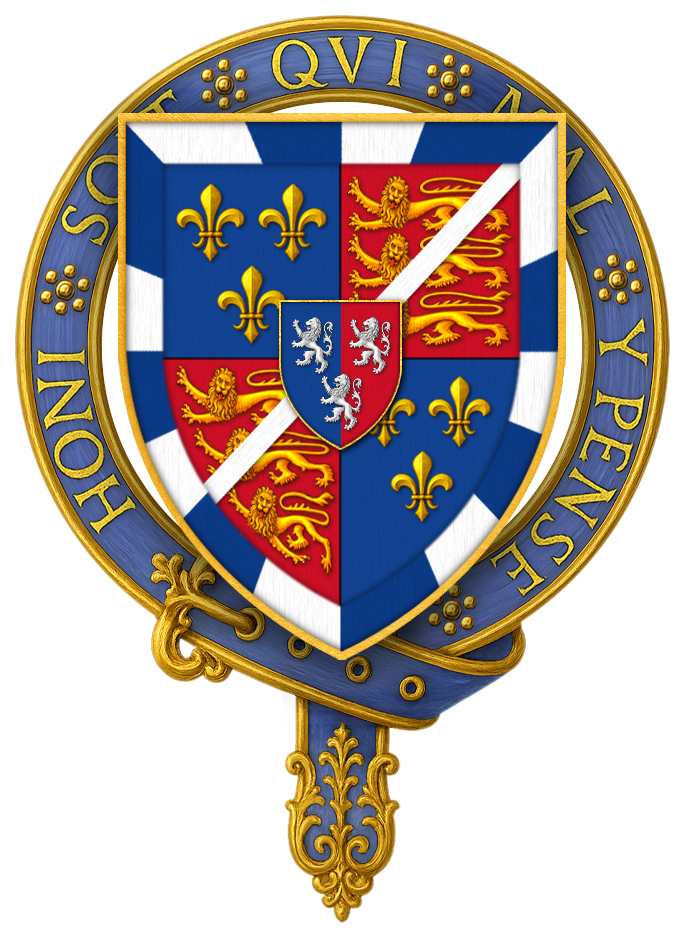
      - Elizabeth Herbert, 3rd Baroness Herbert, m. Charles Somerset, j.u. Baron Herbert then 1st Earl of Worcester.
        - Henry Somerset, 2nd Earl of Worcester, 4th Baron Herbert
          - William Somerset, 3rd Earl of Worcester, 5th Baron Herbert
            - Edward Somerset, 4th Earl of Worcester, 6th Baron Herbert
              - Henry Somerset, 1st Marquess of Worcester, 7th Baron Herbert
                - Edward Somerset, 2nd Marquess of Worcester, 8th Baron Herbert
                  - Henry Somerset, 1st Duke of Beaufort, 9th Baron Herbert
                    - Charles Somerset, Marquess of Worcester (styled Lord Herbert 1667–1682)
                      - Henry Somerset, 2nd Duke of Beaufort, 10th Baron Herbert
                        - Henry Scudamore, 3rd Duke of Beaufort, 11th Baron Herbert
                        - Charles Somerset, 4th Duke of Beaufort, 12th Baron Herbert
                          - Henry Somerset, 5th Duke of Beaufort, 13th Baron Herbert
                            - Henry Somerset, 6th Duke of Beaufort, 14th Baron Herbert
                              - Henry Somerset, 7th Duke of Beaufort, 15th Baron Herbert
                                - Henry Somerset, 8th Duke of Beaufort, 16th Baron Herbert
                                  - Henry Somerset, 9th Duke of Beaufort, 17th Baron Herbert
                                    - Henry Somerset, 10th Duke of Beaufort, 18th Baron Herbert
                                    - Lady Blanche Somerset, m. John Eliot, 6th Earl of St Germans
                                      - Lady Cathleen Eliot, m. John Seyfried
                                        - David Seyfried Herbert, 19th Baron Herbert
    - Sir Richard Herbert, an illegitimate son of William Herbert, 1st Earl of Pembroke (died 1469) (above)
      - William Herbert, 1st Earl of Pembroke (died 1570)
        - Henry Herbert, 2nd Earl of Pembroke
          - William Herbert, 3rd Earl of Pembroke
          - Philip Herbert, 4th Earl of Pembroke
            - Philip Herbert, 5th Earl of Pembroke
              - William Herbert, 6th Earl of Pembroke
              - Philip Herbert, 7th Earl of Pembroke
              - Thomas Herbert, 8th Earl of Pembroke
                - Henry Herbert, 9th Earl of Pembroke
                  - Henry Herbert, 10th Earl of Pembroke, m. Lady Elizabeth Spencer
                    - George Herbert, 11th Earl of Pembroke
                      - Robert Herbert, 12th Earl of Pembroke
                      - Sidney Herbert, 1st Baron Herbert of Lea, m. Elizabeth Ashe à Court-Repington
                        - George Herbert, 13th Earl of Pembroke
                        - Sidney Herbert, 14th Earl of Pembroke
                          - Reginald Herbert, 15th Earl of Pembroke
                            - Sidney Herbert, 16th Earl of Pembroke
                              - Henry Herbert, 17th Earl of Pembroke
                                - William Herbert, 18th Earl of Pembroke
                                - Lady Emma Herbert
                          - Sir George Herbert, 1st Baronet
                        - Michael Henry Herbert
                          - Sir Sidney Herbert, 1st Baronet
                      - Lady Catherine Herbert
                - William Herbert
                  - Henry Herbert, 1st Earl of Carnarvon
                    - Henry Herbert, 2nd Earl of Carnarvon
                      - Henry Herbert, 3rd Earl of Carnarvon
                        - Henry Herbert, 4th Earl of Carnarvon
                          - George Herbert, 5th Earl of Carnarvon
                            - Henry Herbert, 6th Earl of Carnarvon
                              - Henry Herbert, 7th Earl of Carnarvon
                                - George Herbert, 8th Earl of Carnarvon
                          - Aubrey Herbert
                            - Auberon Herbert (landowner)
                        - Auberon Herbert
                          - Auberon Herbert, 9th Baron Lucas
                    - Charles Herbert (Royal Navy officer, born 1774)
                    - William Herbert (botanist)
                      - Henry William Herbert
                    - Algernon Herbert
                      - Robert Herbert
            - William Herbert (died 1646)
            - James Herbert (died 1677)
              - James Herbert (1660–1704)
                - James Herbert (died 1740)
                - Philip Herbert (died 1749)
              - Philip Herbert (died 1716)
            - John Herbert (died 1659)
        - Edward Herbert (died 1595)
          - William Herbert, 1st Baron Powis
            - Percy Herbert, 2nd Baron Powis
              - William Herbert, 1st Marquess of Powis
                - William Herbert, 2nd Marquess of Powis
                  - William Herbert, 3rd Marquess of Powis
                  - Lord Edward Herbert
                    - Barbara Herbert, m. Henry Herbert, 1st Earl of Powis (below)
  - Richard Herbert of Coldbrook
    - Sir Richard Herbert
      - Edward Herbert (died 1593)
        - Richard Herbert, Lord of Cherbury
          - Edward Herbert, 1st Baron Herbert of Chirbury
            - Richard Herbert, 2nd Baron Herbert of Chirbury
              - Edward Herbert, 3rd Baron Herbert of Chirbury
              - Henry Herbert, 4th Baron Herbert of Chirbury
              - Florence Herbert, m. Richard Herbert (below)
          - George Herbert
          - Henry Herbert (Master of the Revels)
            - Henry Herbert, 1st Baron Herbert of Chirbury
              - Henry Herbert, 2nd Baron Herbert of Chirbury
          - Thomas Herbert (seaman)
        - Mathew Herbert
          - Francis Herbert
            - Sir Matthew Herbert, 1st Baronet
            - Richard Herbert, m. Florence Herbert (above)
              - Francis Herbert
                - Henry Herbert, 1st Earl of Powis, m. Barbara Herbert (above)
                  - George Herbert, 2nd Earl of Powis
                  - Lady Henrietta Herbert, m. Edward Clive, 1st Earl of Powis
                    - Edward Herbert, 2nd Earl of Powis
                      - Edward Herbert, 3rd Earl of Powis
                      - Percy Egerton Herbert
                        - George Herbert, 4th Earl of Powis, m. Violet Lane-Fox, 16th Baroness Darcy de Knayth
                          - Mervyn Herbert, 17th Baron Darcy de Knayth
                            - Davina Herbert, 18th Baroness Darcy de Knayth
                      - George Herbert (priest)
                      - Robert Charles Herbert
                        - Edward William Herbert
                          - Edward Herbert, 5th Earl of Powis
                          - Christian Herbert, 6th Earl of Powis
                      - William Henry Herbert
                        - Percy Herbert (bishop)
                          - George Herbert, 7th Earl of Powis
                            - John Herbert, 8th Earl of Powis
                    - Robert Clive (1789–1854), ancestor of Windsor-Clive family
        - Charles Herbert
          - Edward Herbert (attorney-general)
            - Arthur Herbert, 1st Earl of Torrington
            - Edward Herbert (judge)
