= Marquess of Powis =

Title in the Peerage of England

- Arms: Per pale Azure and Gules, three Lions rampant Argent. Crest: A Wyvern wings elevated and addorsed Vert, holding in the mouth a sinister Hand couped at the wrist Gules. Supporters: Dexter: A Panther guardant Argent, spotted of various colours, fire issuing out of the mouth and ears proper, ducally gorged Azure; Sinister: A Lion Argent, ducally gorged Gules.
- Creation date: 24 March 1687
- Created by: James II
- Peerage: Peerage of England
- First holder: William Herbert, 1st Marquess of Powis
- Last holder: William Herbert, 3rd Marquess of Powis
- Subsidiary titles: Earl of Powis; Viscount Montgomery; Baron Powis; Baronet ‘of Redcastle’
- Status: Extinct
- Extinction date: 8 March 1748
- Motto: UNG JE SERVIRAY (One I will serve)

Marquess of Powis was a title in the Peerage of England. It was created in 1687 for William Herbert, 1st Earl of Powis. He had already succeeded his father as third Baron Powis in 1667 and had been created Earl of Powis in the Peerage of England in 1674; Marquess of Powis and Viscount Montgomery in 1687. When James II went into exile in France, the Marquess followed him. He served as Comptroller of the Royal Household and his wife Elizabeth as Governess of the Royal children. He was rewarded in 1698 by the titles Duke of Powis and Marquess of Montgomery, but these titles in the Jacobite Peerage (though used) were not recognised in England.

The title of Baron Powis was created in the Peerage of England in 1629 for William Herbert. He was the son of Sir Edward Herbert, second son of William Herbert, 1st Earl of Pembroke, and Anne Parr. This Herbert family were thus members of a junior branch of the prominent Welsh family headed by the Earl of Pembroke. The peerages became extinct on the death of the first Marquess's grandson, the third Marquess, in 1748.

Barbara, daughter of Lord Edward Herbert, younger son of the second Marquess of Powis and brother of the third Marquess, married Henry Arthur Herbert, who was created Earl of Powis in 1748. They inherited his estates. See this title for more information.

== Baron Powis (1629) ==
- William Herbert, 1st Baron Powis (c. 1573–1655)
- Percy Herbert, 2nd Baron Powis (c. 1600–1667) (had been created a Baronet, of Red Castle, in 1622)
- William Herbert, 3rd Baron Powis (1626–1696) (created Earl of Powis in 1674)

=== Earl of Powis (1674) ===
- William Herbert, 1st Earl of Powis (1626–1696) (created Marquess of Powis in 1687)

=== Marquess of Powis (1687) ===
- William Herbert, 1st Marquess of Powis (1626–1696)
- William Herbert, 2nd Marquess of Powis (1665–1745). Powis was the only son of William Herbert, 1st Marquess of Powis, and Lady Elizabeth Somerset. He married Mary Preston in 1695. They had six children: William Herbert, 3rd Marquess of Powis; Lord Edward Herbert; Lady Mary Herbert; Lady Anne Herbert; Lady Charlotte Herbert; and Lady Theresa Herbert. His second son, Edward (died 1734), married Henrietta Waldegrave, daughter of James Waldegrave, 1st Earl Waldegrave in July 1734. They had one child: Lady Barbara Herbert (1735–1786)
- William Herbert, 3rd Marquess of Powis (1698–1748). Powis was the son of William Herbert, 2nd Marquess of Powis, and Mary Preston. He died unmarried in 1748.

=== Title succession chart ===
Clive-Herbert family tree, including: Barons Powis, Barons Herbert, Barons Clive, Earls of Powis, and Marquesses of Powis

William ap Thomas d. 1445
Earl of Pembroke (8th creation)
William Herbert c. 1423–1469; 1st Earl of Pembroke
William Herbert; 1451–1491; 2nd Earl of Pembroke | Richard Herbert d. 1510 | Richard Herbert of Coldbrook d. 1469
Title surrendered to the Crown 1479
Earl of Pembroke (10th creation) and Baron Herbert of Cardiff, 1551
William Herbert c. 1501–1570; 1st Earl of Pembroke, etc. | Richard Herbert
Henry Herbert c. 1539–1601; 2nd Earl of Pembroke, etc. | Edward Herbert; 1544–1595 | Edward Herbert c. 1513–1593
For descendants, see Earl of Pembroke
Baron Powis of Powis Castle, 1629
William Herbert c. 1573–1655; 1st Baron Powis of Powis Castle | Richard Herbert Lord of Cherbury; 1557–1596 | Mathew Herbert
Baronet Powis, of Red Castle | Baron Herbert of Castle Island, 1624; Baron Herbert of Chirbury (1st creation), 1629
Percy Herbert; 1598–1667; 2nd Baron Powis of Powis Castle, 1st Baronet Powis | Edward Herbert; 1583–1648; 1st Baron Herbert of Cherbury and of Castle Island | Francis Herbert | Henry Herbert, Master of the Revels; 1595–1673
Earl of Powis (1st creation), 1674; Marquess of Powis and Viscount Montgomery, 1687
William Herbert; 1626–1696; 1st Marquess of Powis, etc., 3rd Baron Powis of Powis Castle, 2nd Baronet Powis | Richard Herbert c. 1604–1655; 2nd Baron Herbert of Cherbury and of Castle Island | Edward Herbert
Baron Herbert of Chirbury (2nd creation), 1694
William Herbert; 1665–1745; 2nd Marquess of Powis, etc., 4th Baron Powis of Powis Castle, 5th Baronet Powis | Edward Herbert; 1633–1678; 3rd Baron Herbert of Cherbury and of Castle Island | Florentia Herbert; 1637–1694 | Richard Herbert c. 1629–1676 | Henry Herbert c. 1640–1691; 4th Baron Herbert of Cherbury and of Castle Island | Henry Herbert; 1654–1709; 1st Baron Herbert of Chirbury
Barony Herbert of Cherbury (1st creation) and of Castle Island extinct, 1691
William Herbert; 1698–1748; 3rd Marquess of Powis, 5th Baron Powis of Powis Castle, 6th Baronet Powis | Edward Herbert d. 1734 | Francis Herbert; 1667–1719 | Henry Herbert d. 1738; 2nd Baron Herbert of Chirbury
Marquessate of Powis and all subsidiary titles extinct, 1748 | Barony Herbert of Cherbury (2nd creation) extinct, 1738
Baron Herbert of Chirbury (3rd creation), 1743; Earl of Powis (2nd creation), 1748; Baron Herbert of Chirbury and Ludlow, 1749 | Baron Clive of Plassey, 1762
Barbara Herbert; 1735–1786 | Henry Herbert; 1703–1772; 1st Earl of Powis, etc. | Robert Clive "Clive of India"; 1725–1774; 1st Baron Clive of Plassey
Baron Clive of Walcot, 1794; Baron Herbert of Chirbury (5th creation), 1804; Earl of Powis (3rd creation), Viscount Ludlow and Baron Powis, 1804
George Herbert; 1755–1801; 2nd Earl of Powis, etc. | Henrietta Herbert; 1758–1830 | Edward Clive; 1754–1839; 1st Earl of Powis, etc., 2nd Baron Clive of Plassey
Earldom of Powis (2nd creation) and subsidiary titles extinct, 1801
Edward Herbert; 1785–1848; 2nd Earl of Powis, etc., 3rd Baron Clive of Plassey
Edward Herbert; 1818–1891; 3rd Earl of Powis, etc., 4th Baron Clive of Plassey | Percy Egerton Herbert; 1822–1876 | George Herbert; 1825–1894 | Robert Herbert; 1827–1902 | William Herbert; 1834–1909
Henry Herbert; 1861–1865 | George Herbert; 1862–1952; 4th Earl of Powis, etc., 5th Baron Clive of Plassey | Edward Herbert; 1855–1924 | Graham Herbert; 1856–1917 | Arthur Herbert; 1866–1907 | Henry Herbert; 1882–1911 | Percy Herbert; 1885–1968
Percy Herbert; Viscount Clive; 1892–1916 | Mervyn Herbert; 1904–1943 styled Viscount Clive | Edward Herbert; 1889–1974; 5th Earl of Powis, etc., 6th Baron Clive of Plassey | Christian Herbert; 1904–1988; 6th Earl of Powis, etc., 7th Baron Clive of Plassey | George Herbert; 1925–1993; 7th Earl of Powis, etc., 8th Baron Clive of Plassey
John Herbert b. 1952; 8th Earl of Powis, etc., 9th Baron Clive of Plassey
Jonathan Herbert b. 1979 styled Viscount Clive

== See also ==
- Earl of Pembroke
- Earl of Powis
