= Earl of Powis =

Earldom in the Peerage of Great Britain

Earl of Powis 3rd creation
- Arms: Per pale Azure and Gules, three Lions rampant Argent. Crest: A Wyvern wings elevated and addorsed Vert, holding in the mouth a sinister Hand couped at the wrist Gules. Supporters: Dexter: An Elephant Argent; Sinister: a Griffin wings expanded Argent, charged with five Mullets in saltire Sable, ducally gorged Gules.
- Creation date: 14 May 1804
- Creation: Third
- Created by: George III
- Peerage: Peerage of the United Kingdom
- First holder: Edward Clive, 1st Earl of Powis
- Present holder: John Herbert, 8th Earl of Powis
- Heir apparent: Jonathan Herbert, Viscount Clive
- Subsidiary titles: Viscount Clive; Baron Clive, of Plessey; Baron Clive, of Walcott; Baron Herbert, of Chirbury; Baron Powis, of Powis Castle
- Status: Extant
- Seat: Powis Castle
- Motto: Ung je serviray (One I will serve)

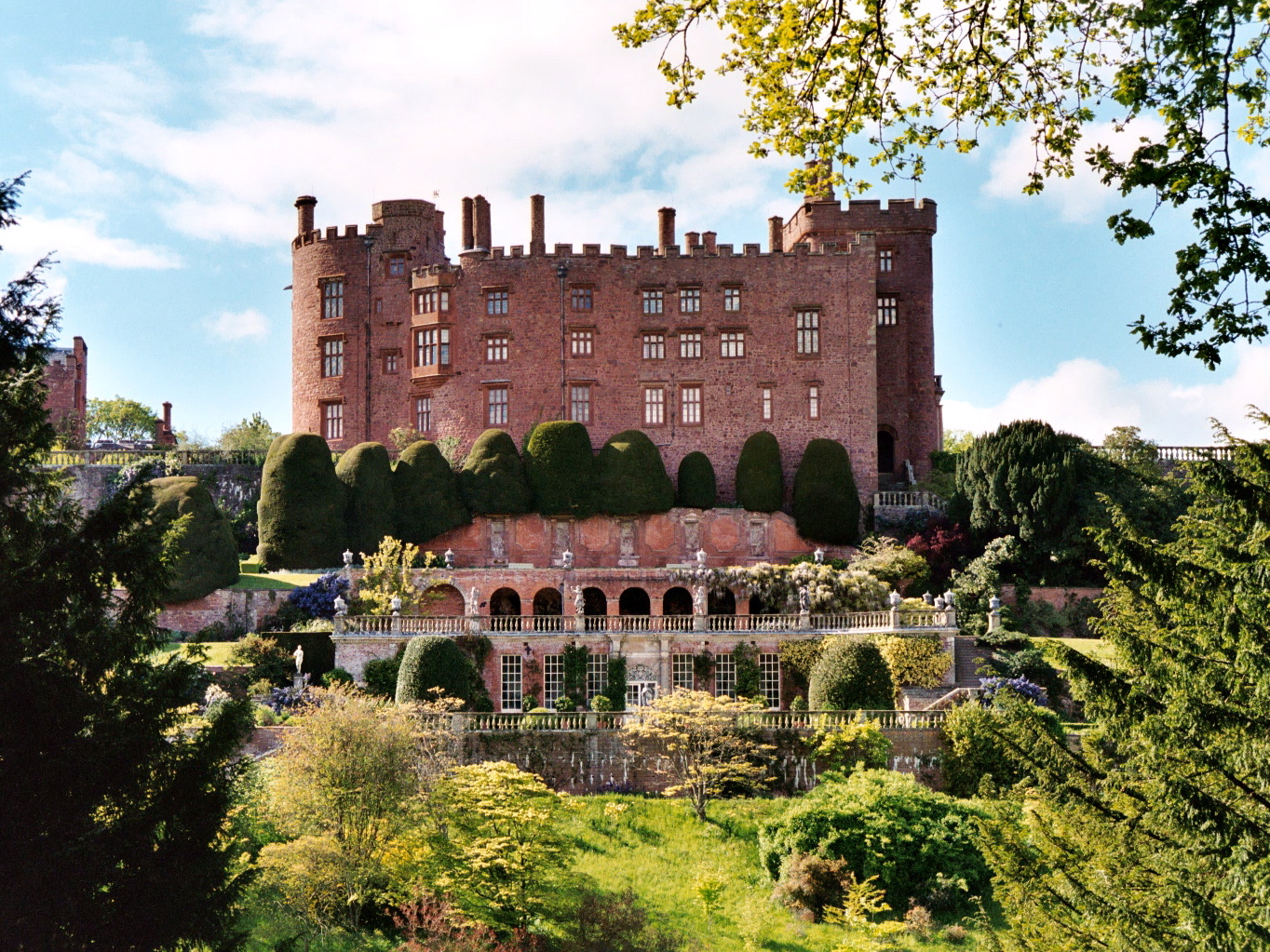
Powis Castle, Wales

Earl of Powis (Powys) is a title that has been created three times. The first creation came in the Peerage of England in 1674 in favour of William Herbert, 3rd Baron Powis, a descendant of William Herbert, 1st Earl of Pembroke (c. 1501–1570). In 1687, he was further honoured when he was made (and as detailed at the article of) Marquess of Powis.

The title was created again in 1748 in the Peerage of Great Britain for Henry Arthur Herbert, the husband of Barbara, daughter of Lord Edward Herbert, brother of William, 3rd Marquess of Powis. He notably represented Bletchingley and Ludlow in Parliament and served as Lord Lieutenant of Montgomeryshire and Shropshire. Herbert had already been created Baron Herbert of Chirbury in 1743 and was made Baron Powis and Viscount Ludlow at the same time he was given the earldom. In 1749 he was also created Baron Herbert of Chirbury and Ludlow, with remainder firstly to his brother Richard Herbert and secondly to his kinsman Francis Herbert, of Ludlow. His son, the second Earl, was also Lord Lieutenant of Montgomeryshire and Shropshire. However, on his death in 1801 all the titles became extinct (the persons in remainder to the 1749 barony had died without heirs before the 2nd Earl).

The title was created for the third time in the Peerage of the United Kingdom in 1804 when Edward Clive, 2nd Baron Clive (being son-in-law of the 1st Earl of the previous creation), was made Earl of Powis, in the County of Montgomeryshire. He had previously represented Ludlow in the House of Commons and served as Lord Lieutenant of Shropshire and Montgomeryshire. Clive was the husband of Lady Henrietta, daughter of the 1st Earl of Powis of the 1748 creation and sister and heiress of the 2nd Earl. He had already been created Baron Clive, of Walcot in the County of Shropshire, in 1794, in the Peerage of Great Britain, and was made Baron Powis, of Powis Castle in the County of Montgomery, Baron Herbert, of Chirbury in the County of Shropshire, and Viscount Clive, of Ludlow in the County of Shropshire, at the same time he was given the earldom. Clive was the son of the famous soldier Robert Clive, who had been raised to the Peerage of Ireland as Baron Clive of Plassey in the County of Clare, in 1762. Known as "Clive of India", he is regarded as a key figure in the establishment of British India.

The 1st Earl was succeeded by his eldest son, the 2nd Earl. He sat as Member of Parliament for Ludlow and served as Lord Lieutenant of Montgomeryshire. In 1807, Lord Powis assumed by Royal licence the surname and arms of Herbert. His son, the 3rd Earl, represented Shropshire North in Parliament and served as Lord Lieutenant of Montgomeryshire. He was succeeded by his nephew, the 4th Earl. He was the son of Lieutenant-General The Rt Hon. Sir Percy Egerton Herbert, second son of the 2nd Earl. Lord Powis was Lord Lieutenant of Shropshire. In 1890, he married Violet Ida Evelyn Herbert (who later became, in 1903, the 16th Baroness Darcy de Knayth, suo jure). Their eldest son Percy Robert Herbert, Viscount Clive, died of wounds received fighting in the Battle of the Somme; their second son Mervyn Horatio Herbert, Viscount Clive, succeeded his mother in the barony on her death in 1929. However, he too predeceased his father and was succeeded in the barony by his daughter Davina as the suo jure 18th Baroness Darcy de Knayth.

Lord Powis was succeeded by his first cousin once removed, the 5th Earl. He was the son of the Hon. Colonel Edward William Herbert, son of the Hon. Robert Charles Herbert, fourth son of the second Earl. On his death the titles passed to his younger brother, the 6th Earl. He was succeeded by his second cousin, the 7th Earl. He was the son of the Right Reverend Percy Mark Herbert, Bishop of Blackburn and of Norwich, son of Major-General the Hon. William Henry Herbert, fifth son of the second Earl. As of 2020 the peerages are held by his son, the 8th Earl, who succeeded in 1993. Lord Powis is also Lord of the manor of Clun.

The Hon. Robert Henry Clive, second son of the 1st Earl, married Harriett Windsor (later Baroness Windsor), in 1819. Their grandson Robert Windsor-Clive, 14th Baron Windsor, was created Earl of Plymouth in 1905. Consequently, the present holder of the earldom of Plymouth is also in remainder to the earldom of Powis and its subsidiary titles. George Windsor-Clive, second son of the Hon. Robert Henry Clive and Lady Windsor, was Member of Parliament for Ludlow for many years.

Another branch of the Clive family was founded by Reverend Benjamin Clive, uncle of the 1st Baron Clive. Members of this branch include George Clive, Edward Clive, George Clive, Edward Clive, Sir Sidney Clive and Sir Robert Clive.

The actor Colin Clive, known for starring in the iconic 1931 horror film Frankenstein, was also a member of the family, descending from the 1st Baron Clive. Colin Clive appeared in the 1935 biopic film about the life of his ancestor, Clive of India.

The family seat is Powis Castle, near Welshpool, Montgomeryshire, Wales.

== Earl of Powis, first creation (1674) ==
- see the Marquess of Powis

== Earl of Powis, second creation (1748) ==
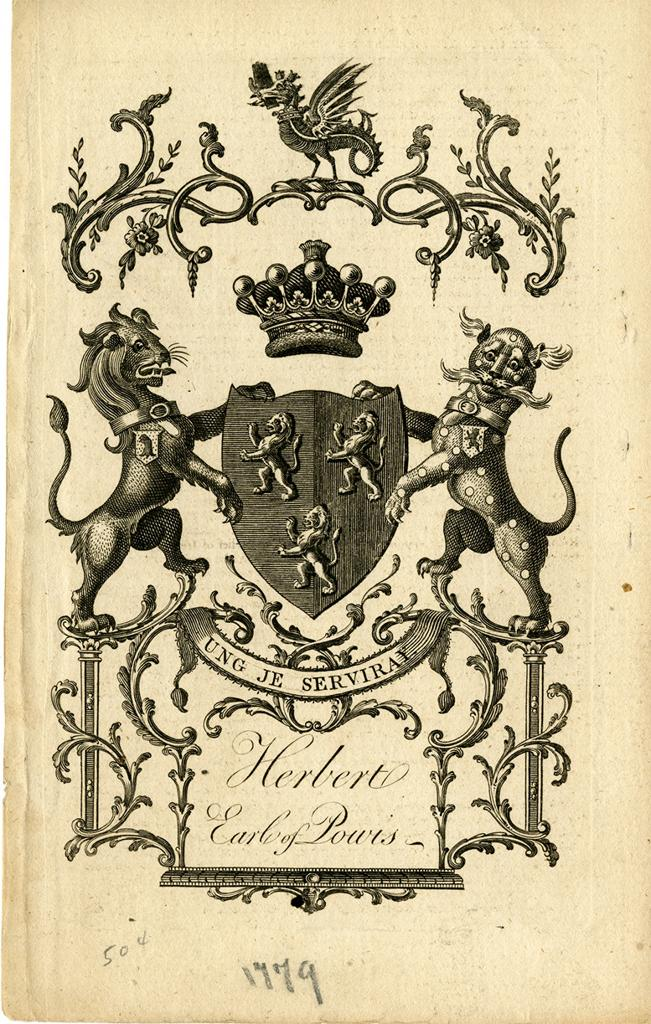
A bookplate showing the coat of arms for the Earl of Powis (2nd creation)

- Henry Arthur Herbert, 1st Earl of Powis (1703–1772)
- George Edward Henry Arthur Herbert, 2nd Earl of Powis (1755–1801)

== Earl of Powis, third creation ==
=== Baron Clive (1762) ===
- Robert Clive, 1st Baron Clive (1725–1774)
- Edward Clive, 2nd Baron Clive (1754–1839) (created Earl of Powis in 1804)

=== Earl of Powis (1804) ===
- Edward Clive, 1st Earl of Powis (1754–1839)
- Edward Herbert, 2nd Earl of Powis (1785–1848)
- Edward James Herbert, 3rd Earl of Powis (1818–1891)
- George Charles Herbert, 4th Earl of Powis (1862–1952)
- Edward Robert Henry Herbert, 5th Earl of Powis (1889–1974)
- Christian Victor Charles Herbert, 6th Earl of Powis (1904–1988)
- George William Herbert, 7th Earl of Powis (1925–1993)
- John George Herbert, 8th Earl of Powis (born 1952)

The heir apparent is the present holder's son, Jonathan Nicholas William Herbert, Viscount Clive (born 1979).

== Title succession chart ==
Clive-Herbert family tree, including: Barons Powis, Barons Herbert, Barons Clive, Earls of Powis, and Marquesses of Powis

William ap Thomas d. 1445
Earl of Pembroke (8th creation)
William Herbert c. 1423–1469; 1st Earl of Pembroke
William Herbert; 1451–1491; 2nd Earl of Pembroke	Richard Herbert d. 1510	Richard Herbert of Coldbrook d. 1469
Title surrendered to the Crown 1479
Earl of Pembroke (10th creation) and Baron Herbert of Cardiff, 1551
William Herbert c. 1501–1570; 1st Earl of Pembroke, etc.	Richard Herbert
Henry Herbert c. 1539–1601; 2nd Earl of Pembroke, etc.	Edward Herbert; 1544–1595	Edward Herbert c. 1513–1593
For descendants, see Earl of Pembroke
Baron Powis of Powis Castle, 1629
William Herbert c. 1573–1655; 1st Baron Powis of Powis Castle	Richard Herbert Lord of Cherbury; 1557–1596	Mathew Herbert
Baronet Powis, of Red Castle	Baron Herbert of Castle Island, 1624; Baron Herbert of Chirbury (1st creation), 1629
Percy Herbert; 1598–1667; 2nd Baron Powis of Powis Castle, 1st Baronet Powis	Edward Herbert; 1583–1648; 1st Baron Herbert of Cherbury and of Castle Island	Francis Herbert	Henry Herbert, Master of the Revels; 1595–1673
Earl of Powis (1st creation), 1674; Marquess of Powis and Viscount Montgomery, 1687
William Herbert; 1626–1696; 1st Marquess of Powis, etc., 3rd Baron Powis of Powis Castle, 2nd Baronet Powis	Richard Herbert c. 1604–1655; 2nd Baron Herbert of Cherbury and of Castle Island	Edward Herbert
Baron Herbert of Chirbury (2nd creation), 1694
William Herbert; 1665–1745; 2nd Marquess of Powis, etc., 4th Baron Powis of Powis Castle, 5th Baronet Powis	Edward Herbert; 1633–1678; 3rd Baron Herbert of Cherbury and of Castle Island	Florentia Herbert; 1637–1694	Richard Herbert c. 1629–1676	Henry Herbert c. 1640–1691; 4th Baron Herbert of Cherbury and of Castle Island	Henry Herbert; 1654–1709; 1st Baron Herbert of Chirbury
Barony Herbert of Cherbury (1st creation) and of Castle Island extinct, 1691
William Herbert; 1698–1748; 3rd Marquess of Powis, 5th Baron Powis of Powis Castle, 6th Baronet Powis	Edward Herbert d. 1734	Francis Herbert; 1667–1719	Henry Herbert d. 1738; 2nd Baron Herbert of Chirbury
Marquessate of Powis and all subsidiary titles extinct, 1748	Barony Herbert of Cherbury (2nd creation) extinct, 1738
Baron Herbert of Chirbury (3rd creation), 1743; Earl of Powis (2nd creation), 1748; Baron Herbert of Chirbury and Ludlow, 1749	Baron Clive of Plassey, 1762
Barbara Herbert; 1735–1786	Henry Herbert; 1703–1772; 1st Earl of Powis, etc.	Robert Clive "Clive of India"; 1725–1774; 1st Baron Clive of Plassey
Baron Clive of Walcot, 1794; Baron Herbert of Chirbury (5th creation), 1804; Earl of Powis (3rd creation), Viscount Ludlow and Baron Powis, 1804
George Herbert; 1755–1801; 2nd Earl of Powis, etc.	Henrietta Herbert; 1758–1830	Edward Clive; 1754–1839; 1st Earl of Powis, etc., 2nd Baron Clive of Plassey
Earldom of Powis (2nd creation) and subsidiary titles extinct, 1801
Edward Herbert; 1785–1848; 2nd Earl of Powis, etc., 3rd Baron Clive of Plassey
Edward Herbert; 1818–1891; 3rd Earl of Powis, etc., 4th Baron Clive of Plassey	Percy Egerton Herbert; 1822–1876	George Herbert; 1825–1894	Robert Herbert; 1827–1902	William Herbert; 1834–1909
Henry Herbert; 1861–1865	George Herbert; 1862–1952; 4th Earl of Powis, etc., 5th Baron Clive of Plassey	Edward Herbert; 1855–1924	Graham Herbert; 1856–1917	Arthur Herbert; 1866–1907	Henry Herbert; 1882–1911	Percy Herbert; 1885–1968
Percy Herbert; Viscount Clive; 1892–1916	Mervyn Herbert; 1904–1943 styled Viscount Clive	Edward Herbert; 1889–1974; 5th Earl of Powis, etc., 6th Baron Clive of Plassey	Christian Herbert; 1904–1988; 6th Earl of Powis, etc., 7th Baron Clive of Plassey	George Herbert; 1925–1993; 7th Earl of Powis, etc., 8th Baron Clive of Plassey
John Herbert b. 1952; 8th Earl of Powis, etc., 9th Baron Clive of Plassey
Jonathan Herbert b. 1979 styled Viscount Clive

== See also ==
- Marquess of Powis
- Baron Herbert of Chirbury
- Earl of Plymouth
- Baron Darcy de Knayth
- Ludlow Castle
