= Charlotte Percy, Duchess of Northumberland =

English duchess

Her Grace The Duchess of Northumberland
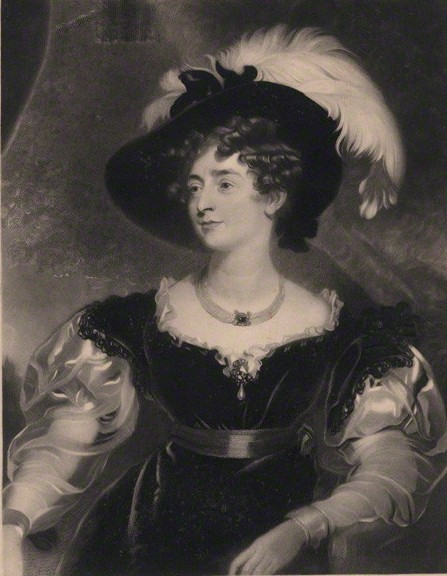
- The Duchess in 1845 by William Oakley Burgess
- Born: Hon. Charlotte Florentia Clive; 12 September 1787; Florence, Grand Duchy of Tuscany
- Died: 27 July 1866 (aged 78); Twickenham, London, England
- Burial place: Westminster Abbey
- Spouse: Hugh Percy, 3rd Duke of Northumberland (m. 1817; died 1847)
- Parent(s): Edward Clive, 1st Earl of Powis; Lady Henrietta Herbert

Charlotte Florentia Percy, Duchess of Northumberland (née Hon. Charlotte Florentia Clive; 12 September 1787 – 27 July 1866), was governess of the future Queen Victoria.

== Family ==
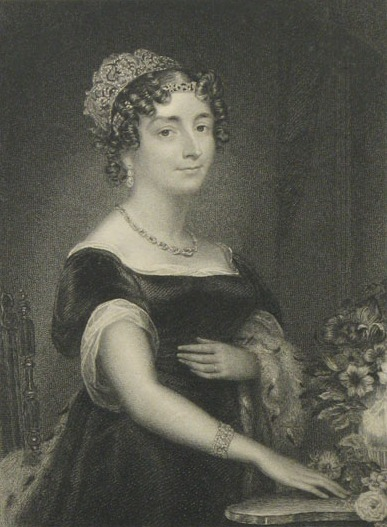
Engraving of the Duchess published by La Belle Assemblée in 1829

Charlotte Florentia Clive was born in Florence, the younger daughter and third child of the politician Lord Clive, and the mineral collector Henrietta Clive (née Herbert). Through her father, she was the granddaughter of Major-General Robert Clive, 1st Baron Clive and, through her mother, Henry Herbert, 1st Earl of Powis. Her father was created the Earl of Powis in 1804 after the title of his brother-in-law George Herbert, 2nd Earl of Powis became extinct upon the latter's death in 1801.

Lady Charlotte married Hugh Percy, Earl Percy, son of General Hugh Percy, 2nd Duke of Northumberland, on 29 April 1817. On 10 July the same year, her father-in-law died and her husband succeeded to the dukedom.

== Roles ==
In 1825, the Duke and Duchess of Northumberland attended the coronation of King Charles X of France in Reims as representatives of King George IV of the United Kingdom. The Duchess accompanied her husband to Dublin during his time as Lord Lieutenant of Ireland from 1829 to 1830. In 1831, being a friend of King William IV, she was appointed governess of his niece and heir presumptive, Princess Victoria of Kent, who ascended the British throne in 1837. The role was mostly ceremonial, and Victoria continued to rely mostly on Baroness Louise Lehzen. The Duchess was dismissed in 1837 by the Princess's mother, the Duchess of Kent, for attempting to become more influential in the girl's education and refusing to submit to the Duchess of Kent's comptroller, Sir John Conroy. She had earlier opposed the harshness of the Kensington System, designed by Conroy and the Duchess of Kent, and wrote to Princess Feodora of Leiningen (the Duchess of Kent's daughter and Princess Victoria's elder half-sister) to ask her to tell the King to intervene. Feodora and the Duchess of Northumberland were also determined to protect Baroness Lehzen from the hostility of Conroy and his friend, Lady Flora Hastings.

== Death and legacy ==
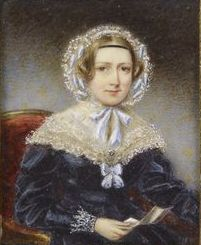
This 1839 portrait of the Duchess by Thomas Overton was bought by Queen Victoria in 1870.

The childless marriage of the Duke and Duchess of Northumberland ended with the Duke's death on 11 February 1847. The Duchess died in Twickenham on 27 July 1866. As a Duchess of Northumberland, she is buried in Westminster Abbey.

The Duchess was born into a plant-loving family and was an avid plant enthusiast herself. She was the first person in Great Britain to cultivate and bring to flower Southern African plants belonging to the genus Clivia, named in her honour by the Kew botanist John Lindley in 1828.
