= Mary Herbert, Marchioness of Powis =

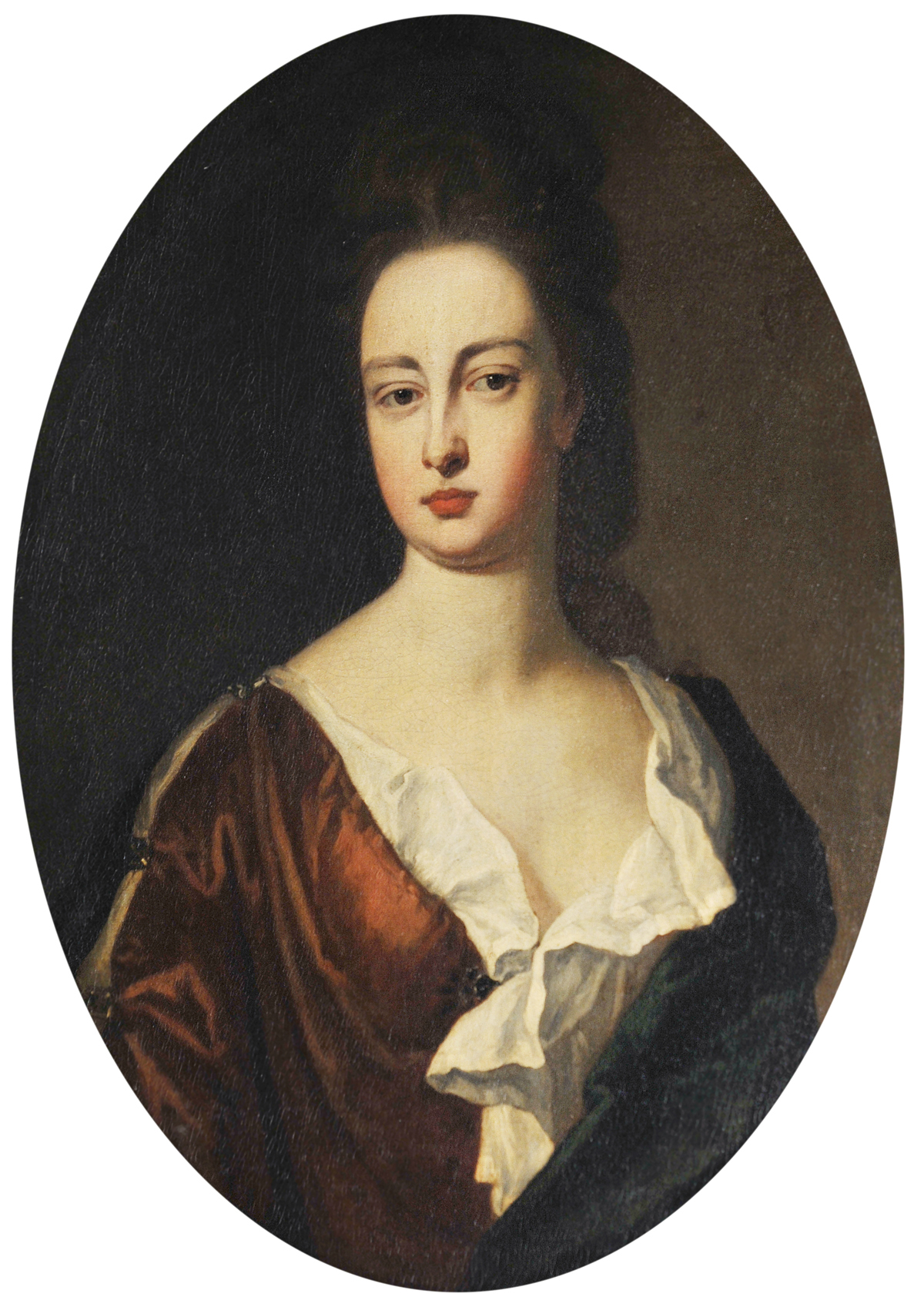
Mary Herbert (née Preston), portrait by Michael Dahl

Mary Herbert, Marchioness of Powis (née Preston; died 8 January 1724), was the wife of William Herbert, 2nd Marquess of Powis and the mother of William Herbert, 3rd Marquess of Powis.

== Early life ==
Mary was the eldest daughter and co-heir of Sir Thomas Preston, 3rd Baronet, of Furness and his wife, the former Hon. Mary Molyneux. Her sister, Anne Preston, married Hugh Clifford, 2nd Baron Clifford of Chudleigh.

Her paternal grandfather was Sir John Preston, 1st Baronet. Her maternal grandparents were Caryll Molyneux, 3rd Viscount Molyneux and the former Mary Barlow (a daughter of Sir Alexander Barlow).

== Personal life ==
She married the Marquess of Powis, then known as Viscount Montgomery because of his father's links with the deposed king James II and VII, in about 1695. Shortly afterwards he was imprisoned as a result of his Jacobite sympathies. He was restored to his title and estates and recalled to Parliament in 1722; at this time he regained possession of Powis Castle, which the family had lost as the result of an action during the English Civil War. The couple had six children:

- Lady Mary Herbert (1684–1775), who married Joseph Gage, Count Gage, younger brother of Thomas Gage, 1st Viscount Gage, and second son of Joseph Gage of Shirburn Castle. NB Mary was a close friend and business partner of Joseph Gage but quite probably did NOT marry him. See Duchess of Rio Tinto by Martin Murphy.
- William Herbert, 3rd Marquess of Powis (1698–1748), who died unmarried.
- Lord Edward Herbert (d. 1734), who married Lady Henrietta Waldegrave, only daughter of James Waldegrave, 1st Earl Waldegrave, in 1734.
- Lady Anne Herbert (d. 1757), who married, as his second wife, Henry Arundell, 6th Baron Arundell of Wardour
- Lady Charlotte Herbert, who married Edward Morris. After his death, she married Edward Williams, of Yeslyn.
- Lady Theresa Herbert (1706–1723), who married Sir Robert Throckmorton, 4th Baronet, of Coughton, in c. 1721.

The marchioness died on 8 January 1724, and was buried within her husband's property at Hendon.
