= Joseph Gage =

English businessman (c. 1687–1766)

- Born: c.1687
- Died: 1766 (aged 78–79)
- Occupation(s): Entrepreneur, Speculator
- Spouses: Catherine Caryll; (m.1748, died a few months later): Mary Herbert (possibly)

Joseph Edward Gage (c.1687 – 1766) was an entrepreneur and speculator. He was the son of Joseph Gage of Sherborne Castle and Elizabeth Penruddock and the brother of Thomas Gage, 1st Viscount Gage Bt.

== Career ==
As a young man in Paris, he borrowed money from Richard Cantillon to speculate in shares in Mississippi Company and the South Sea Company. He made a vast paper fortune, whereupon he offered Augustus II the Strong the King of Poland 3,000,000 pounds for his crown. When this offer was declined, he made a similar offer for the crown of Sardinia. Later, he was granted a silver mine, and entered into the service of the King of Spain, given the command of his armies in Sicily and Lombardy, and created a grandee (March 1743) of the first class of the kingdom of Spain. He was also presented by the King of Naples with the order of San Gennaro, and a pension of 4000 ducats a year.

== Personal life ==
Historians disagree over whether or not he married his business partner Lady Mary Herbert. He wrote to her father, William Herbert, 2nd Marquess of Powis, in 1736 to ask for his consent to their marriage. Murphy claims that he later married Catherine Caryll, daughter of John Caryll, of West Harting, Sussex, in 1748 and that he was widowed a few months later.

Manners Chichester claims that Gage first married Catherine Caryll, and then after her death remarried to Lady Mary Herbert.

== See also ==
- Viscount Gage
