= Custos Rotulorum of Montgomeryshire =

This is a list of people who have served as Custos Rotulorum of Montgomeryshire.

- Sir John Salusbury before 1544 – c. 1548
- Edward Herbert before 1558–1593
- Richard Herbert 1594–1596
- Richard Broughton 1596–1602
- William Herbert, 1st Baron Powis 1602–1641
- Philip Herbert, 4th Earl of Pembroke 1641–1643
- Herbert Vaughan 1643–1646
- Interregnum
- Edward Vaughan Mar–July 1660
- Edward Herbert, 3rd Baron Herbert of Chirbury 1660–1678
- Hon. Andrew Newport Jan – Dec 1679
- Henry Herbert, 4th Baron Herbert of Chirbury 1679–1685
- Hon. Andrew Newport 1685–1687
- William Herbert, 1st Marquess of Powis 1687–1689
- Henry Herbert, 4th Baron Herbert of Chirbury 1689–1691
- Hon. Andrew Newport 1691–1699
- Charles Gerard, 2nd Earl of Macclesfield 1700–1701
- Richard Newport, 2nd Earl of Bradford 1701–1711
- Price Devereux, 9th Viscount Hereford 1711–1714
- Richard Newport, 2nd Earl of Bradford 1714–1723
- Henry Newport, 3rd Earl of Bradford 1724–1734
- Henry Herbert, 1st Earl of Powis 1735–1772

For later custodes rotulorum, see Lord Lieutenant of Montgomeryshire.
