= Lady Henrietta Waldegrave =

English aristocrat (1717-1753)

Lady Henrietta Beard (née Waldegrave, previously Herbert; 2 January 1717 – 31 May 1753), was an English aristocrat. She was the wife of Lord Edward Herbert and the mother of Barbara Herbert, Countess of Powis. Following her first husband’s death she married a Covent Garden singer, John Beard.

== Early life ==
Born most likely in Ghent, Flanders to a grandson of James II and Arabella Churchill, she was the daughter of James Waldegrave, 1st Earl Waldegrave, and Mary Webb, daughter of Sir John Webb, 3rd Baronet of Hatherop.

In 1719, when she was two, her father left the Stuart court in St. Germaine, converted to the Anglican faith, moved to London, and showed his support for George I. This move, which he reportedly regretted on his deathbed, allowed him to resume his seat in the House of Lords, and catapulted him almost immediately to an Ambassadorship. Henrietta's brothers, including James Waldegrave, 2nd Earl Waldegrave, prospered from this move both financially and politically as well, James becoming briefly the First Lord of the Treasury. Henrietta, meanwhile, was raised Roman Catholic by her maternal grandparents, the Webbs, at their request. The Webb family owned property in Dorset, Wiltshire, and Gloucestershire, with their primary seat at Hatherop Castle.

== Personal life ==
In July, 1734, when Lady Henrietta was 14, the Webbs arranged for her to marry Lord Edward Herbert, second son of William Herbert, 2nd Marquess of Powis, with prospects to inherit from his childless brother. Lord Edward died four months after the marriage, leaving her a widow who would give birth to a daughter in 1735.

- Barbara Herbert (1735–1785), who married General Henry Herbert, 1st Earl of Powis, in 1751.

=== Second marriage ===
On 8 January 1739, at age 19, she secretly re-married, this time to a favorite singer of Handel and Garrick, John Beard of Covent Garden. She had no children with Beard, although the two were reported to be very happy together until she died in 1753. Beard erected a monument for her at St. Pancras Church.

=== Descendants ===
Through her only child Barbara, she was a grandmother of George Herbert, 2nd Earl of Powis.

== Bibliography ==
- Winton Dean (2001). "Beard, John". In Sadie, Stanley; Tyrrell, John (eds.). The New Grove Dictionary of Music and Musicians (2nd ed.). London: Macmillan Publishers. ISBN 978-1-56159-239-5.
