= William Herbert, 1st Baron Powis =

Welsh politician

The Right Honourable The Lord Powis KB
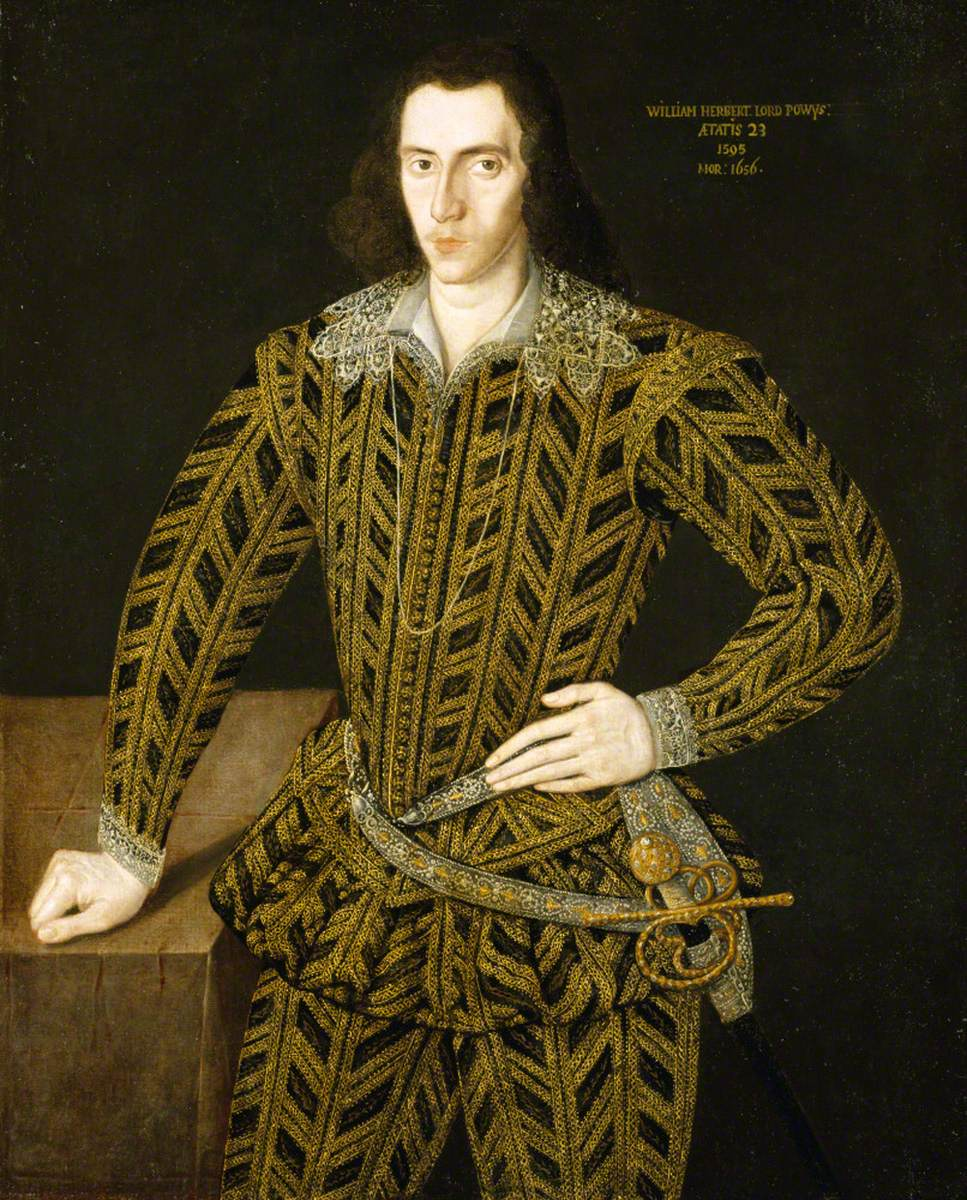
- Portrait of William Herbert, 1595

Member of Parliament for Montgomeryshire
- In office 1604–1629
- Preceded by: Edward Herbert
- Succeeded by: Parliament suspended until 1640
- In office 1597–1597
- Preceded by: Reginald Williams
- Succeeded by: Edward Herbert

Personal details
- Born: William Herbert c. 1573 Powis Castle
- Died: 7 March 1655 (aged 81–82)
- Spouse: Lady Eleanor Percy
- Relations: William Herbert, 1st Earl of Pembroke (grandfather); Anne Herbert, Countess of Pembroke (grandmother); Sir Thomas Stanley (grandfather); William Herbert, 1st Marquess of Powis (grandson); Roger Palmer, 1st Earl of Castlemaine (grandson)
- Parent(s): Sir Edward Herbert; Mary Stanley

William Herbert, 1st Baron Powis KB (c. 1573 – 7 March 1655) was a Welsh politician who sat in the House of Commons at various times between 1597 and 1629.

== Early life ==
Herbert was born in Powis Castle, the son of Sir Edward Herbert (c. 1542–1595) and the former Mary Stanley. In 1587, his father purchased the lands of the abeyant barony of Powis from their distant relative, Edward, an illegitimate son of the 3rd Baron Grey of Powis.

His maternal grandfather was Sir Thomas Stanley, who served as Under-Treasurer of the Royal Mint at the Tower of London during the reign of Queen Elizabeth I. His father was the second son of William Herbert, 1st Earl of Pembroke and the former Anne Parr, sister of Queen Catherine Parr (the last of the six wives of King Henry VIII). His paternal uncle was Henry Herbert, 2nd Earl of Pembroke.

== Career ==
Herbert was High Steward to Elizabeth I of England. In 1597, he was elected Member of Parliament for Montgomeryshire. He served as Custos Rotulorum of Montgomeryshire from 1602 to 1641. Upon the coronation of James I in 1603, Herbert was made a Knight of the Bath.

In 1604, he was elected MP for Montgomeryshire again. He was appointed High Sheriff of Montgomeryshire in 1613. In 1614, he was re-elected MP for Montgomeryshire and was re-elected in 1624, 1625, 1626 and 1628. He was created Baron Powis (a new creation) of Powis Castle on 2 April 1629.

== Personal life ==
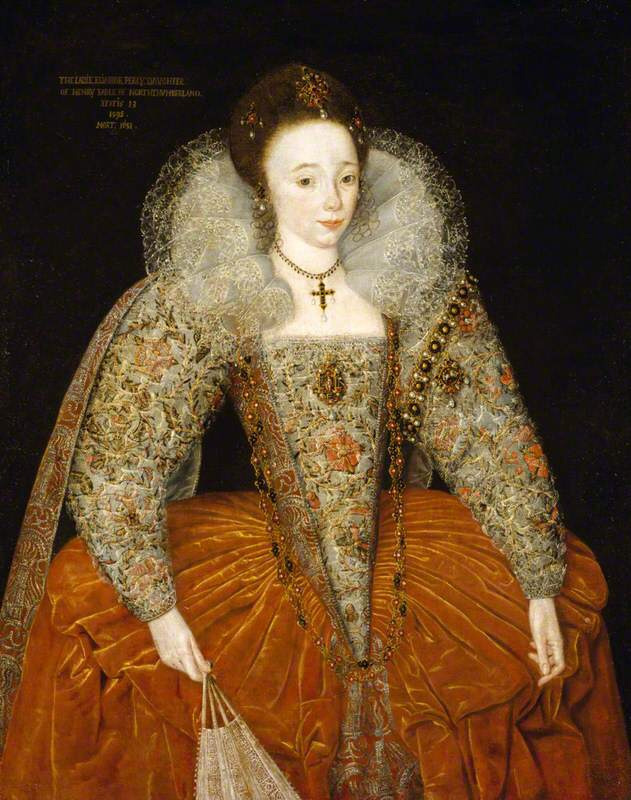
Lady Eleanor Percy in 1595, aged 13

Before 1600, Lord Powis married Lady Eleanor Percy (1583–1650), third daughter of Henry Percy, 8th Earl of Northumberland and his wife, Katherine Neville (eldest daughter and co-heiress of John Nevill, 4th Baron Latymer). They had several children including:

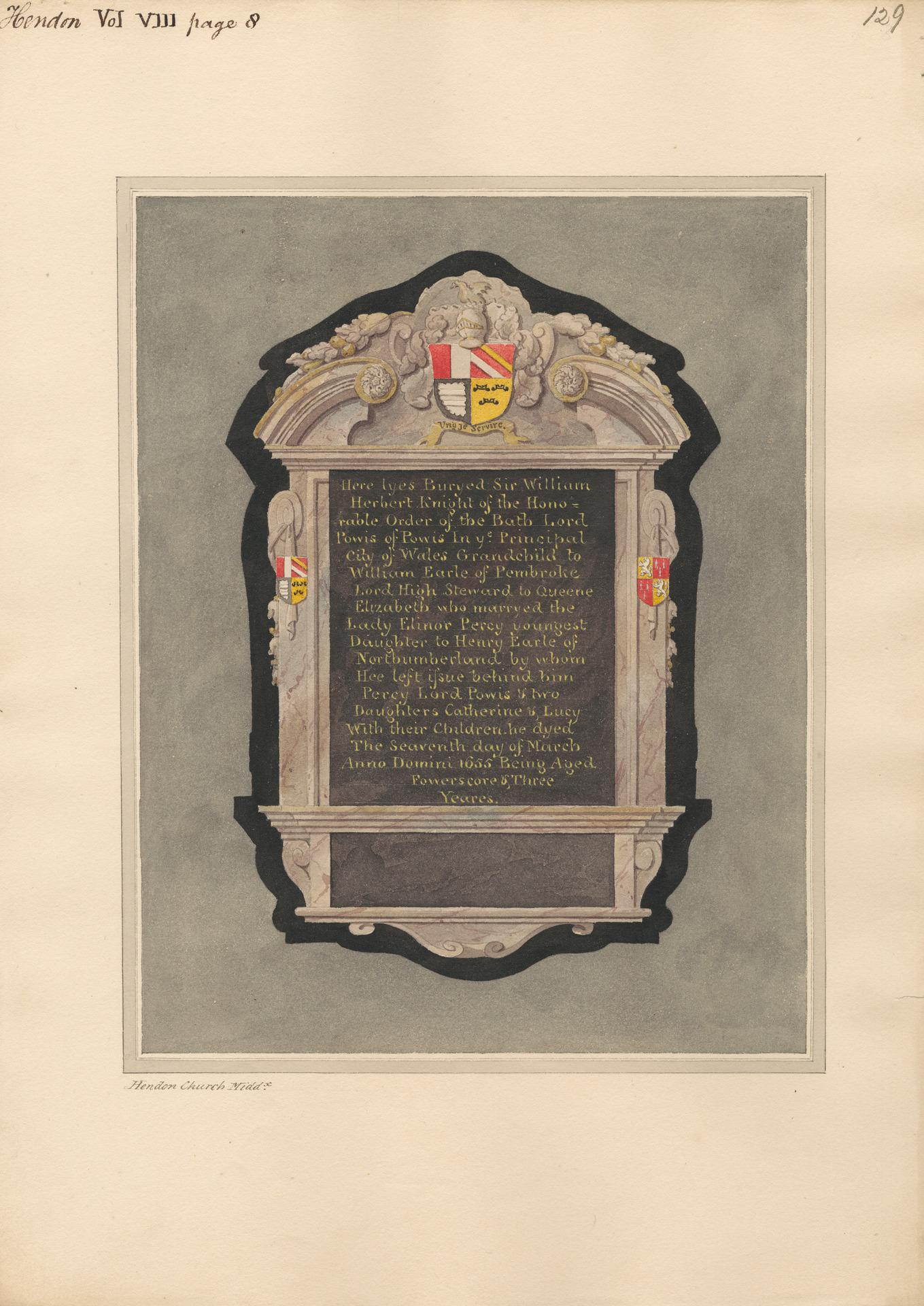
Herbert's memorial at Hendon

- Percy Herbert, 2nd Baron Powis (1598–1667), who was created a baronet in 1622 before succeeding to his father's titles; he married Elizabeth Craven, eldest surviving daughter of Sir William Craven, Lord Mayor of London.
- Katherine Herbert (c. 1600–1666), who married Sir Robert Vaughan of Llwydiarth. After his death, she married Sir James Palmer.
- Lucy Herbert, who married William Habington (or Abington) of Hindlip in early 1633.
- Marie Herbert (1604–1660), who married Humphrey Jones, son of Gruffyd Jones.

Lord Powis died on 7 March 1655. He was succeeded by his son Percy Herbert, 2nd Baron Powis. Herbert was buried at St. Mary's Church in Hendon, Middlesex, London.

=== Descendants ===
Through his eldest son, he was a grandfather of William Herbert (1626–1696), who became the 1st Earl of Powis in 1674 and then 1st Marquess of Powis in 1687.

Through his daughter Katherine's second marriage, she was the mother of Roger Palmer, 1st Earl of Castlemaine, best known for his marriage to Barbara Villiers, one of Charles II's mistresses whom the King ennobled as the Duchess of Cleveland.

== In popular culture ==
Herbert is a candidate for "Mr WH", the dedicatee of Shakespeare's sonnets.

Parliament of England
| Preceded by Reginald Williams | Member of Parliament for Montgomeryshire; 1597 | Succeeded by Edward Herbert |
| Preceded by Edward Herbert | Member of Parliament for Montgomeryshire; 1604–1629 | Parliament suspended until 1640 |
Political offices
| Preceded by Richard Broughton | Custos Rotulorum of Montgomeryshire; 1602–1641 | Succeeded by The Earl of Pembroke |
Peerage of England
| New creation | Baron Powis; 1628–1655 | Succeeded by Percy Herbert |
