= Barbara Herbert, Countess of Powis =

The Right Honourable The Countess of Powis
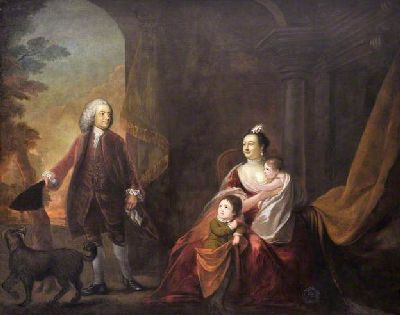
- The Earl and Countess of Powis with their two children in 1760
- Born: 24 June 1735
- Died: 12 March 1786 (aged 50)
- Spouse: Henry Herbert, 1st Earl of Powis (m. 1751)
- Issue: George Herbert, 2nd Earl of Powis; Henrietta Clive, Countess of Powis
- Parents: Lord Edward Herbert; Lady Henrietta Waldegrave

Barbara Herbert, Countess of Powis (24 June 1735 – 12 March 1786), was the wife of General Henry Herbert, 1st Earl of Powis.

== Early life ==
Barbara's father, Lord Edward Herbert, was a younger son of William Herbert, 2nd Marquess of Powis; he married Lady Henrietta Waldegrave, but died only a few months after the wedding, in 1734. Barbara was born three months after her father's death.

== Personal life ==
On 30 March 1751, when Barbara was just fifteen, she married her kinsman Henry Arthur Herbert, who was in his late forties. Henry was descended from Richard Herbert, 2nd Baron Herbert of Chirbury, and was created Earl of Powis in 1748, following the death without heirs of Barbara's uncle, William Herbert, 3rd Marquess of Powis. Together, Barbara and Henry were the parents of two children:

- George Edward Henry Arthur Herbert, 2nd Earl of Powis (1755–1801), who died unmarried.
- Lady Henrietta Antonia Herbert (1758–1830), who married Edward Clive, 2nd Baron Clive, who was later created Earl of Powis, and had issue.

In 1771, shortly before the earl's death, the family seat at Oakly Park was sold to Robert Clive, 1st Baron Clive, and they moved permanently to Powis Castle. A portrait of Barbara by an unknown artist, dated to approximately 1750, is held at Powis Castle, in the care of the National Trust.

=== Descendants ===
Through her daughter Lady Henrietta, she was a grandmother of Lady Henrietta Antonia Herbert (wife of Sir Watkin Williams-Wynn, 5th Baronet), Edward Herbert, 2nd Earl of Powis, Lady Charlotte Florentia Herbert (wife of Hugh Percy, 3rd Duke of Northumberland), and politician Robert Henry Clive.
