= 78th Regiment of Foot (1745) =

- Coat of arms of Lord Herbert.
- Active: 1745–1746
- Country: Kingdom of Great Britain
- Branch: British Army
- Type: Infantry
- Garrison/HQ: Shrewsbury, Gloucester
- Engagements: Jacobite rising of 1745

Commanders
- Colonel of the Regiment: Lord Herbert of Chirbury

The 78th Regiment of Foot, Lord Herbert's Regiment, or The Shropshire Fusiliers, was a regiment in the British Army from 1745 to 1746.

== History ==
In response to the Jacobite rising of 1745, the regiment was raised in Shropshire by Lord Herbert of Chirbury. Lord Herbert was commissioned as colonel on October 4. Lord Herbert's Regiment, locally known as "The Shropshire Fusiliers", received the rank of 78th.

The 78th Foot was declared "half-complete" on 8 November. It garrisoned Shrewsbury "and places adjacent". On 8 December, local military authorities ordered the Regiment to march to Ashbourne as the Jacobite Army was attacking Derbyshire. The manoeuvre was chaotic but the Jacobite never attacked the Regiment.

In late January 1746, the Regiment marched to Gloucester. It garrisoned the city and sent companies to neighbouring localities. On 1 March 1746, tensions flared between English and Welsh soldiers, the latter having a day off to celebrate Saint David's Day, which led to a minor mutiny.

On 7 June, the Regiment received orders to march to Shrewsbury. It was disbanded there ten days later.

== Uniform ==
The Regiment had blue coats and red facings. These colours are the Royal colours and also correspond to the principal tinctures of the coat of arms of Lord Herbert.
