= Mary Herbert (businesswoman) =

- Born: 1686
- Died: 1775 (aged 88–89)
- Spouse: Joseph Gage (possibly)
- Parents: William Herbert, 2nd Marquess of Powis (father); Mary Preston (mother)

Mary Herbert (1686–1775), also known as Doña Maria Herbert de Powis, was a British-Spanish businesswoman.

== Early life and education ==
She was a Catholic from a noble family in Wales, whose seat was at Powis Castle. For this reason, she is sometimes referred to as Doña Maria Herbert de Powis in Spanish sources. She was the daughter of William Herbert, 2nd Marquess of Powis and Mary Preston Herbert, Marchioness of Powis.

She was educated at a convent school in Ghent. On finishing school, she went to live with her paternal aunt Anne Herbert Smith, Viscountess Carington (wife of Francis Smith, 2nd Viscount Carrington) in Paris. While there, she turned down a proposal from a man named Harry Bedingfeld.

== Career ==
In 1727 she was awarded a contract by Conde de Cogorani of Compañia Española to drain and work the Pozo Rico silver mine in Guadalcanal in the Sierra Norte de Sevilla. She emigrated to Spain in 1729 to engaged in this major mining enterprise, with support of the king of Spain. The business met with several setbacks which caused a several-year-long process between Mary Herbert and the English crown until she won the case in 1742.

== Personal life ==
There is disagreement among historians about whether or not she was married to her business partner, Joseph Gage. In 1736, he wrote to her father asking for permission to marry Mary.
