= Edward Herbert (died 1595) =

English politician

The Honourable Sir Edward Herbert

Member of Parliament for Old Sarum
- In office 1562–1563 Serving with Henry Compton
- Preceded by: John Harington; Henry Hart
- Succeeded by: John Young; Edmund Ludlow

Personal details
- Born: June 1544; Hendon, London
- Died: 23 March 1595 (aged 50); Powys, Wales
- Spouse: Mary Stanley
- Relations: Henry Herbert, 2nd Earl of Pembroke (brother); Sir Richard Herbert (grandfather); Sir Thomas Parr (grandfather); Maud Green (grandmother); Katherine Parr (aunt); William Parr, 1st Marquess of Northampton (uncle)
- Children: 12, including William Herbert, 1st Baron Powis
- Parent(s): William Herbert, 1st Earl of Pembroke; Anne Parr
- Education: Peterhouse, Cambridge

Hon. Sir Edward Herbert of Powis Castle (June 1544 – 23 March 1595) was an English politician and landowner. His aunt, Katherine Parr, was the sixth, and final, wife of King Henry VIII.

== Early life ==
Herbert was born in Hendon, London, and was the second son of the William Herbert, 1st Earl of Pembroke, and Anne Parr, co-heiress to the barony of FitzHugh through her father and a Gentlewoman of the Chamber to Queen Catherine Howard (fifth wife of King Henry VIII). His elder brother was Henry Herbert, 2nd Earl of Pembroke and his sister, Lady Anne Herbert, married Hon. Francis Talbot, Lord Talbot (the eldest son and heir apparent of George Talbot, 6th Earl of Shrewsbury). After the death of his mother in c. 1551, his father remarried to Lady Anne Compton, the widow of Peter Compton and daughter of George Talbot, 4th Earl of Shrewsbury.

His paternal grandparents were Sir Richard Herbert (a guardian of the young King Edward VI) and the former Margaret Cradock. His maternal grandparents were Sir Thomas Parr and the former Maud Green (a daughter of Sir Thomas Green). His maternal aunt, Katherine Parr, was the sixth, and final, wife of King Henry VIII, and his uncle was ennobled as the 1st Marquess of Northampton.

== Career ==
After receiving his education at Peterhouse, Cambridge, he was returned as a Member of the Parliament of England for Old Sarum from 1562 to 1563. Upon the death of his father in 1569, he inherited the manor of Hendon in Middlesex, also inheriting his mother's lands in Northamptonshire and Westmorland.

Herbert was knighted in 1574 and, in 1587, he purchased the lands of the abeyant barony of Powis from his distant relative, Edward, an illegitimate son of the 3rd Baron Grey of Powis, the direct descendant of the last prince of Powys Wenwynwyn. Edward Jr. was his second cousin through his great-grandfather William Herbert, 1st Earl of Pembroke of Raglan Castle, who was Edward Jr.'s great-great-grandfather.

== Personal life ==
In 1570, Herbert was married to Mary Stanley, the daughter and heiress of Sir Thomas Stanley, who served as Under-Treasurer of the Royal Mint at the Tower of London during the reign of Queen Elizabeth I. Together, they were the parents of four sons and eight daughters, including:

- William Herbert, 1st Baron Powis (c. 1573–1655), who married Lady Eleanor Percy, third daughter of Henry Percy, 8th Earl of Northumberland and the former Hon. Catherine Nevill (eldest daughter and co-heiress of John Nevill, 4th Baron Latymer).
- Eleanor Herbert (b. 1580) who married Walter Baldwin
- Anne Herbert (b. 1583) who married William Stanley of Hooton
- Catherine Herbert (b. 1586) who married William Massey (son of John Massey and Elizabeth Aston) 1607

Herbert died in 1595 and was buried at St Mary's Church in Welshpool.
