= Reginald Williams (MP) =

English politician

Reginald Williams (died 1612) of Plas-y-Court, Willaston (now Wollaston), Shropshire, was an English politician.

He was the eldest son of Thomas Williams of Willaston (High Sheriff of Montgomery, 1560), trained in the law at the Inner Temple in 1561, and called to the bar in 1571. He was escheator for Shropshire from February 1573 to January 1574 and appointed joint prothonotary for Flintshire and Denbighshire in 1579. He served as a JP for Montgomeryshire by 1585 and for Shropshire from 1596.

He was elected a Member of the Parliament of England for Preston in 1571 and Montgomeryshire in 1593. He was appointed High Sheriff of Montgomeryshire for 1593–94.

He married three times; firstly Margaret, the daughter of Gerard Gore of Yorkshire and London, with whom he had 7 sons and 2 daughters, secondly Bridget, the daughter of James Price of Mynachdy and widow of Walter Baskerville and thirdly Jane, the daughter of Humphrey Coningsby of Hampton Court, Herefordshire and widow of William Broughton of Lawford, Warwickshire.
