= Edward Herbert, 5th Earl of Powis =

Lieutenant-Colonel The Right Honourable The Earl of Powis CBE TD

Personal details
- Born: Edward Robert Henry Herbert; 19 May 1889
- Died: 15 January 1974 (aged 84)
- Spouse: Ella Mary Rathborne (after 1932)
- Relations: Sir Hedworth Williamson, 8th Baronet (grandfather)
- Parent(s): Edward William Herbert; Beatrice Anne Williamson
- Education: Eton College
- Alma mater: Christ Church, Oxford

Edward Robert Henry Herbert, 5th Earl of Powis CBE TD (19 May 1889 – 15 January 1974)

== Early life ==
Herbert was born on 19 May 1889. He was the son of Col. Edward William Herbert and Beatrice Anne Williamson. Among his siblings, who were later granted the rank of earl's children, Lady Dorothy Marguerite Elizabeth Herbert (wife of Hon. Robert Hepburn-Stuart-Forbes-Trefusis, son of Charles Hepburn-Stuart-Forbes-Trefusis, 20th Baron Clinton), Lady Phyllis Hedworth Camilla Herbert (wife of Martin Drummond Vesey Holt of Holt's Military Banking family), and Christian Victor Charles Herbert (later the 6th Earl of Powis).

His paternal grandparents were Hon. Robert Charles Herbert (a younger son of Edward Herbert, 2nd Earl of Powis and Lucy Herbert, Countess of Powis) and the former Anna Maria Cludde (only child and heiress of Edward Cludde). His maternal grandparents were Sir Hedworth Williamson, 8th Baronet and Lady Elizabeth Liddell (a daughter of Henry Liddell, 1st Earl of Ravensworth).

He was educated at Eton College before attending Christ Church, Oxford.

== Career ==
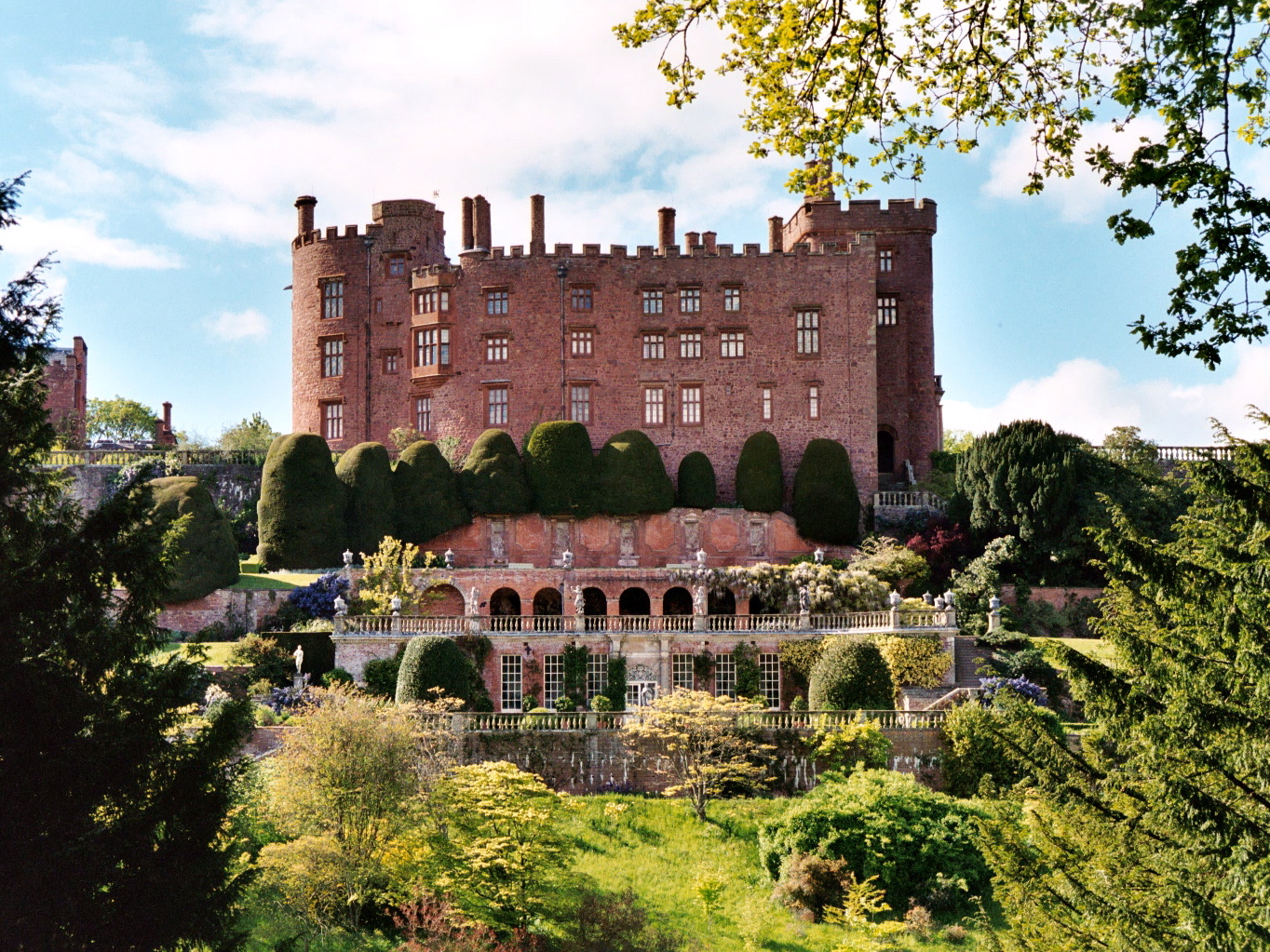
Powis Castle.

Herbert fought in World War I, where he was wounded. He gained the rank of Major in the King's Royal Rifle Corps, was attached to the Tank Corps Training Centre, and fought in the Iraqi revolt of 1920. He was awarded the Territorial Decoration and was appointed Commander of the Most Venerable Order of the Hospital of St. John of Jerusalem.

Herbert gained the rank of Lieutenant-Colonel in 1939 in the King's Shropshire Light Infantry and fought in World War II. He was appointed Commander of the Order of British Empire in 1945.

Upon the death of George Herbert, 4th Earl of Powis, his first cousin once removed, he succeeded as the 5th Earl of Powis on 9 November 1952. To afford the estate duties of £601,321 (which was then $1,683,698) arising from the death of the 4th Earl, Lord Powis offered the tax collector 199 family heirlooms and sold more than 15,000 acres and gave Powis Castle to the government in order to preserve it (and reduce the tax bill by about £320,000. The family heirlooms included 83 paintings, some by Sir Joshua Reynolds and Thomas Gainsborough, 25 statues, and 13 tapestries.

== Personal life ==
On 12 March 1932, Herbert was married to Ella Mary Rathborne (1890-1987), a daughter of Col. William Hans Rathborne of Scripplestown, County Dublin, and Bella Grace MacNeale. After he inherited the earldom, he commissioned Richard von Marientreu to do a portrait of himself and his wife, both completed in 1954.

Lord Powis died on 15 January 1974.

Peerage of the United Kingdom
Preceded by George Charles Herbert	Earl of Powis; 1952–1974	Succeeded by Christian Victor Charles Herbert
