= Henrietta Clive, Countess of Powis =

British mineral collector and botanist

The Right Honourable The Countess of Powis
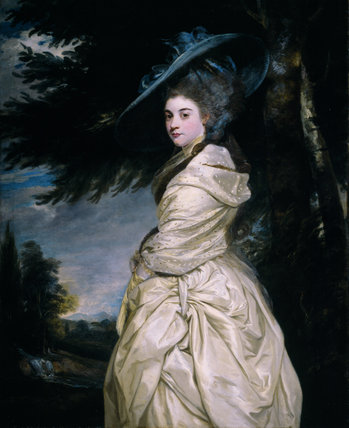
- Portrait by Sir Joshua Reynolds, 1777
- Born: Henrietta Antonia Herbert; 3 September 1758; Oakly Park, Bromfield, Shropshire, England
- Died: 3 June 1830 (aged 71); Walcot Hall, Southorpe, England
- Buried: Bromfield Parish Church
- Spouse: Edward Clive, 1st Earl of Powis (m. 1784)
- Issue: Lady Henrietta Williams-Wynn; Edward Herbert, 2nd Earl of Powis; Charlotte Percy, Duchess of Northumberland; Robert Clive
- Parents: Henry Herbert, 1st Earl of Powis; Barbara Herbert
- Occupation: Writer, mineral collector, botanist

Henrietta Antonia Clive, Countess of Powis (née Herbert; 3 September 1758 – 3 June 1830), was a British writer, mineral collector, and botanist. Her time in India, while her husband was Governor of Madras, was inspirational to her for all three of these pursuits.

== Early life and background ==
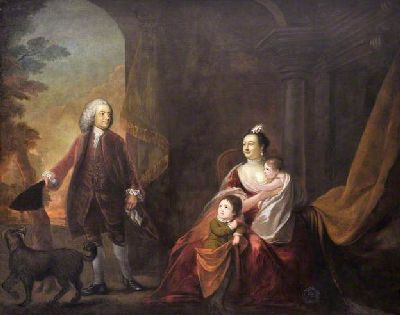
Lady Henrietta with her parents and brother in 1760

Born in Oakly Park, at Bromfield, Shropshire, into a landed and titled family, she was the daughter of Henry Herbert, 1st Earl of Powis, and Barbara Herbert, granddaughter of William Herbert, 2nd Marquess of Powis. Her family owned a property in London and significant estates in Wales and Shropshire. Her birthplace was sold to Robert Clive, 1st Baron Clive, in 1771, so Lady Henrietta spent her teenage years at the family's ancestral home, Powis Castle.

== Mineral collection and botany ==
In 1798, Henrietta's husband, Lord Edward Clive, was appointed Governor of Madras. Lady Clive followed him to India. It is not known when she first began taking a scientific interest in collecting and cataloguing rocks and minerals but she was certainly pursuing this interest by the time she arrived in India and continued it after she returned to Britain. She was one of the first aristocratic woman to pursue this hobby. As her collection was growing, Lady Clive contacted prominent collectors and mineral dealers, such as James Sowerby, John MacCulloch and the Countess of Aylesford. Her records show that many specimens had been given to her by her children. The minerals in Lady Clive's collection, numbering up to 1,000, are arranged systematically by chemistry, as was usual in the early 19th century. In 1817, she organised her collection in two handwritten catalogues, using numbers to identify each specimen and helping the collection remain remarkably complete to this day. A quarter of the original collection is now kept at the National Museum Wales as one of the most important historic mineral collections, having been donated by her great-grandson, George Herbert, 4th Earl of Powis, in 1929.

Upon arriving in India, Lady Powis also created a garden and kept a record of the plants in the area of Mysore and the Carnatic region.

== Writing ==
Lady Clive's journals are one of the first written accounts of India by a British woman. Published in the 2010 edited collection Birds of Passage: Henrietta Clive's Travels in South India 1798-1801, they were an important milestone in the emergence of female travel writers and their ascension to the level of their male counterparts.

== Marriage and issue ==
Lady Henrietta married Lord Clive's eldest son and heir, Edward Clive, 1st Baron Clive, in 1784. The marriage was beneficial to both families; the bride's family had a prestigious name but considerable debts, while the groom accrued wealth built during Clive's military campaigns in India. The couple settled in Walcot Hall, at Lydbury North, near Bishop's Castle, Shropshire. Their four children were:

- Lady Henrietta Antonia Herbert (d. 1835); married Sir Watkin Williams-Wynn, 5th Baronet had issue.
- Edward Herbert, 2nd Earl of Powis (1785–1848); married Lady Lucy Graham
- Lady Charlotte Florentia Herbert (1787–1866); married Hugh Percy, 3rd Duke of Northumberland, and was the governess of the future Queen Victoria.
- Robert Henry Clive (1798–1854); a politician; married Harriet Windsor-Clive, 13th Baroness Windsor

Henrietta's eldest son (Edward Clive junior) inherited the Herbert estates upon the death of her brother, George Herbert, 2nd Earl of Powis, in 1801, when the earldom became extinct. Three years later, it was recreated in favour of her husband, making him Earl of Powis and granting his wife the title of Countess of Powis. A condition of George Herbert's will obliged Edward Clive junior to change his surname to 'Herbert', the traditional family name of the Earls of Powis in order to inherit the castle and its estates. A second condition of the will prohibited Edward Clive junior from inheriting the 'Clive' estates; in order to claim his Herbert inheritance, young Edward would have to relinquish those to his younger brother. Edward Clive senior and Lady Henrietta acted as caretakers for their son's inheritance until he came of age to inherit his uncle's estates.

== Death ==
The Countess of Powis died at Walcot Hall in 1830 aged 71 and was buried at Bromfield Parish Church, near Oakley Park. Her husband survived her, dying in 1839.
