= William Herbert, 2nd Marquess of Powis =

English peer and Jacobite supporter

The Most Honourable The Marquess of Powis DL
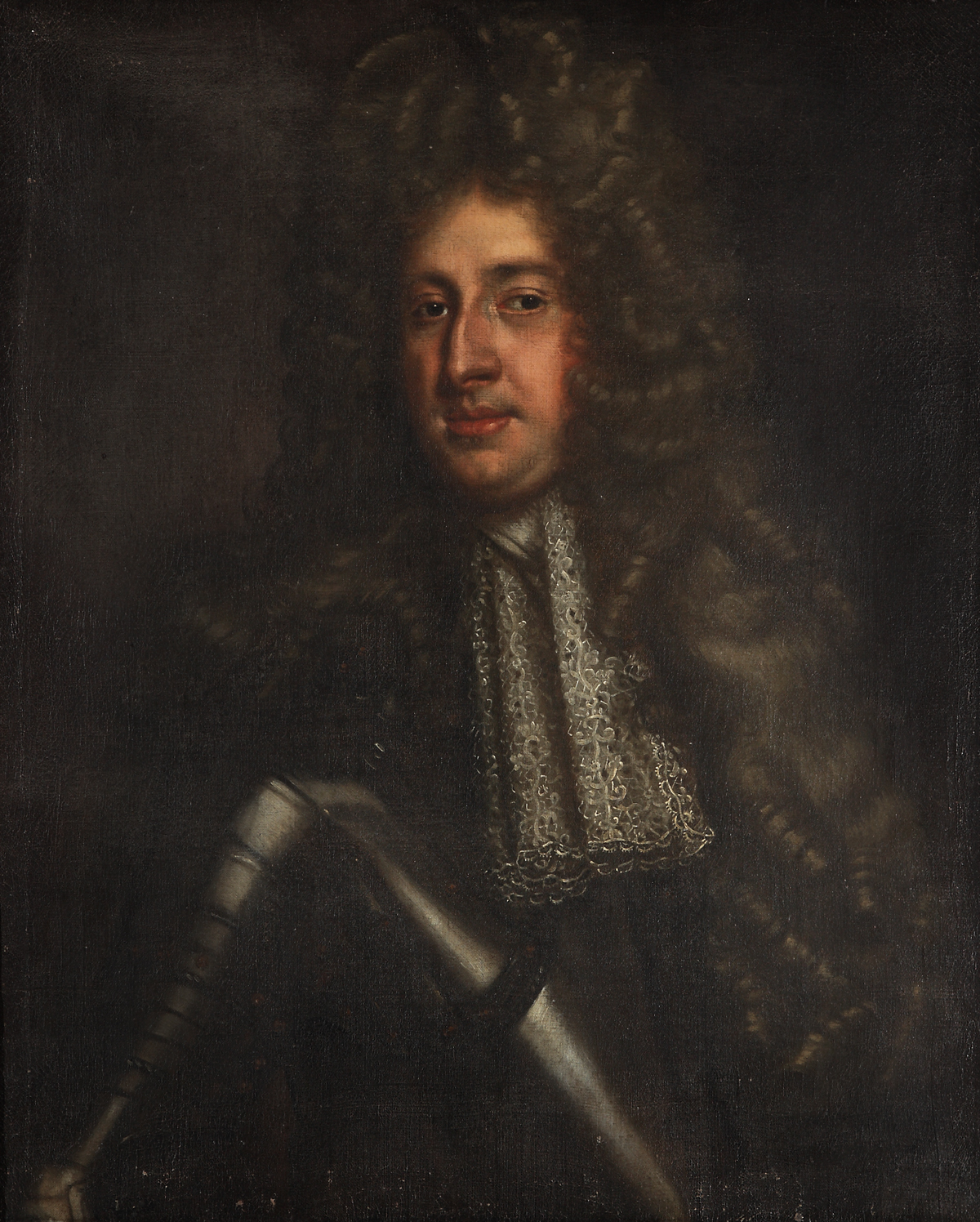
- Portrait of Lord Powis, by François de Troy

Colonel of Viscount Montgomery's Regiment of Foot
- In office 1687–1688
- Preceded by: Marquess of Worcester
- Succeeded by: Sir John Hanmer

Personal details
- Born: William Herbert c. 1665
- Died: 22 October 1745 (aged 79–80)
- Spouse: Mary Preston (m. 1695; died 1724)
- Children: 6
- Parent(s): William Herbert, 1st Marquess of Powis; Lady Elizabeth Somerset
- Relatives: Percy Herbert, 2nd Baron Powis (grandfather); Edward Somerset, 2nd Marquess of Worcester (grandfather)

William Herbert, 2nd Marquess of Powis DL (c. 1665 – 22 October 1745) was an English peer and Jacobite supporter.

== Early life ==
Herbert was born in c. 1665. He was the son of William Herbert, 1st Marquess of Powis, by Lady Elizabeth Somerset. Among his siblings were Frances Mackenzie, Countess of Seaforth (wife of Kenneth Mackenzie, 4th Earl of Seaforth), Lady Mary Maxwell (wife of Richard Molyneux, Francis Browne, 4th Viscount Montagu, and Sir George Maxwell of Orchardtoun, 3rd Baronet), Anne Smith, Viscountess Carrington (wife of Francis Smith, 2nd Viscount Carrington), Lady Lucy Herbert (who became a canoness regular and devotional writer), and Winifred Maxwell, Countess of Nithsdale (wife of William Maxwell, 5th Earl of Nithsdale).

His father was the only son of Percy Herbert, 2nd Baron Powis and the former Elizabeth Craven. His mother was the younger daughter of Edward Somerset, 2nd Marquess of Worcester.

Until 1722 he was known as Viscount Montgomery. At the coronation of James II, 23 April 1685, he acted as page of honour. From 8 May 1687 until November 1688 he was colonel of a regiment of foot, and was also deputy-lieutenant of six Welsh counties from 26 February to 23 December 1688.

== Career ==
He served as Deputy Lieutenant of Anglesey in 1688. After the Glorious Revolution, efforts on behalf of James II resulted in Montgomery's committal to the Tower of London on 6 May 1689 and he was not given bail until 7 November. On 5 July 1690, and again on 23 March 1696 a proclamation, accompanied by a reward of £1,000, was issued for his apprehension; on the latter occasion, he was suspected of complicity in the Jacobite assassination plot. In May 1696 he was outlawed, but a technical error on the part of the sheriffs of London enabled him to retain his estate. He surrendered on 15 December 1696 and was taken to Newgate Prison. Though he was reported to have given information concerning the plot, he remained there until 19 June 1697, when during an outbreak of gaol fever he was released on bail.

Montgomery was not tried, and in November 1700 was ill at Ghent. In January 1701 King William III allowed him to travel from Flanders in order to raise money on his estate and pay debts. He paid a second visit to London on 25 May 1703, surrendered himself, and was admitted to bail. Financial difficulties led him to sell his house in Lincoln's Inn Fields to the Duke of Newcastle in May 1705. He was living in Powis House in Great Ormond Street in 1708.

Arrested again during the Jacobite alarm in September 1715, Montgomery was considered harmless. He was eventually restored to his titles and estates, including Powis Castle, and was summoned to parliament as Marquess of Powis on 8 October 1722. By Jacobites, he was styled Duke of Powis, and he and his eldest son prepared a statement of their claim to that title; but the claim does not seem to have been pressed.

== Personal life ==
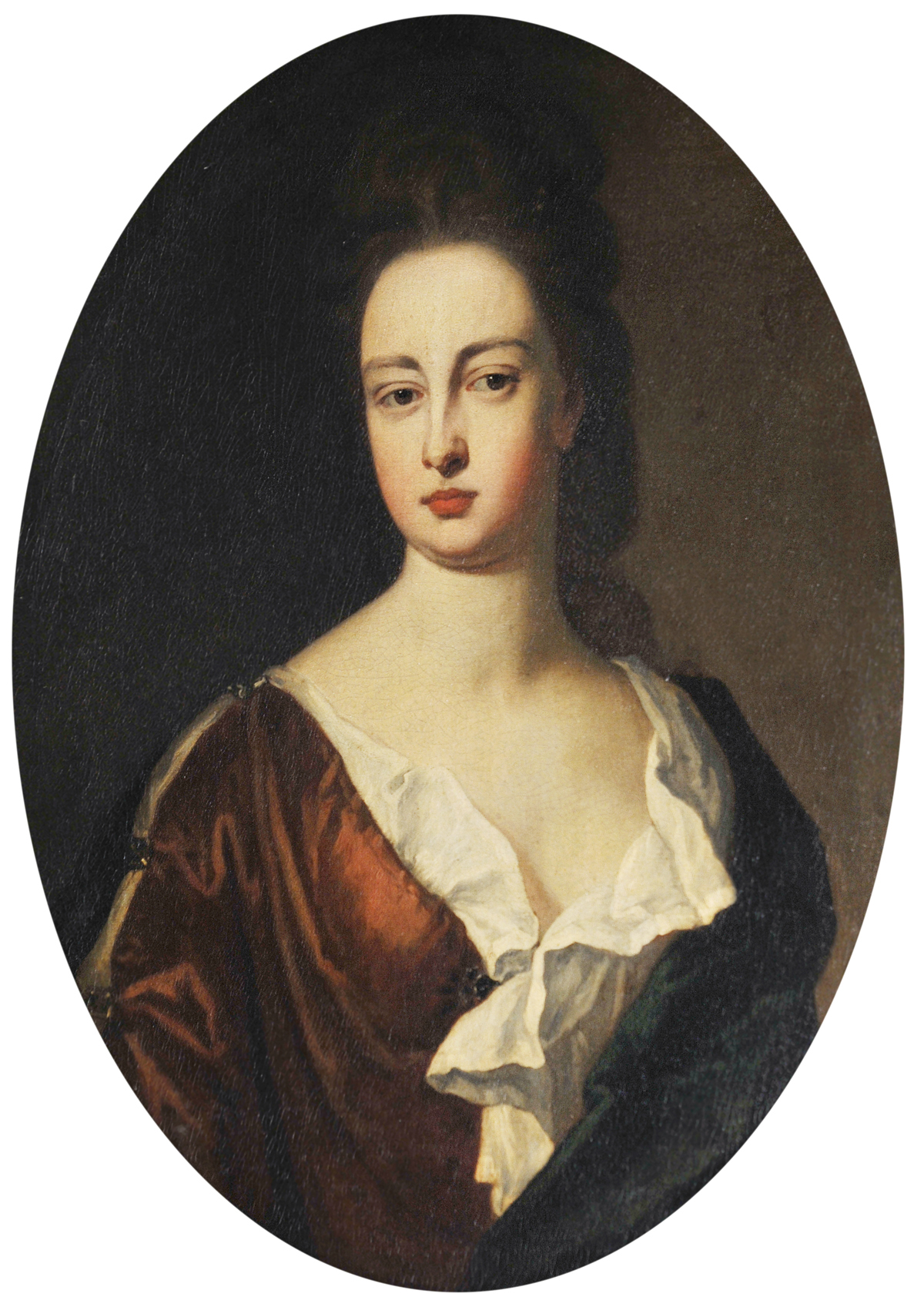
Lady Mary, portrait by Michael Dahl

In c. 1695 Montgomery married Mary Preston, eldest daughter and co-heiress of Sir Thomas Preston, 3rd Baronet of Furness and his wife, Hon. Mary Molyneux (eldest daughter of Caryll Molyneux, 3rd Viscount Molyneux). Together, Mary and William had two sons and four daughters, including:

- William Herbert, 3rd Marquess of Powis (1698–1748), who died unmarried.
- Lord Edward Herbert (d. 1734), who married Lady Henrietta Waldegrave, only daughter of James Waldegrave, 1st Earl Waldegrave, in 1734.
- Lady Mary Herbert, who married Joseph Gage, Count Gage, younger brother of Thomas Gage, 1st Viscount Gage, and second son of Joseph Gage of Shirburn Castle.
- Lady Anne Herbert (d. 1757), who married, as his second wife, Henry Arundell, 6th Baron Arundell of Wardour, in c. 1728.
- Lady Charlotte Herbert, who married Edward Morris. After his death, she married Edward Williams, of Yeslyn.
- Lady Theresa Herbert (1706–1723), who married Sir Robert Throckmorton, 4th Baronet, of Coughton, in c. 1721.

Lady Powis died on 8 January 1724 and was buried at Hendon, where the marquess had property. Lord Powis died on 22 October 1745 and was succeeded by his eldest son, William. Upon William's death, without issue, in 1748, the marquessate became extinct and the family fortune was left to his heir-male, Lord Herbert of Chirbury, who married the 2nd Marquesses granddaughter, Barbara Herbert.

=== Descendants ===
Through his son Lord Edward, he was a grandfather of Barbara Herbert, who married a kinsman, Henry Arthur Herbert, who was created Baron Herbert of Cherbury in 1743, and Earl of Powis in 1748.

Military offices
| Preceded by Marquess of Worcester | Colonel of Viscount Montgomery's Regiment of Foot; 1687–1688 | Succeeded by Sir John Hanmer |
Peerage of England
| Preceded by William Herbert | Marquess of Powis; 1696–1745 | Succeeded by William Herbert |
