= George Herbert, 2nd Earl of Powis =

British peer

- Earl of Powis
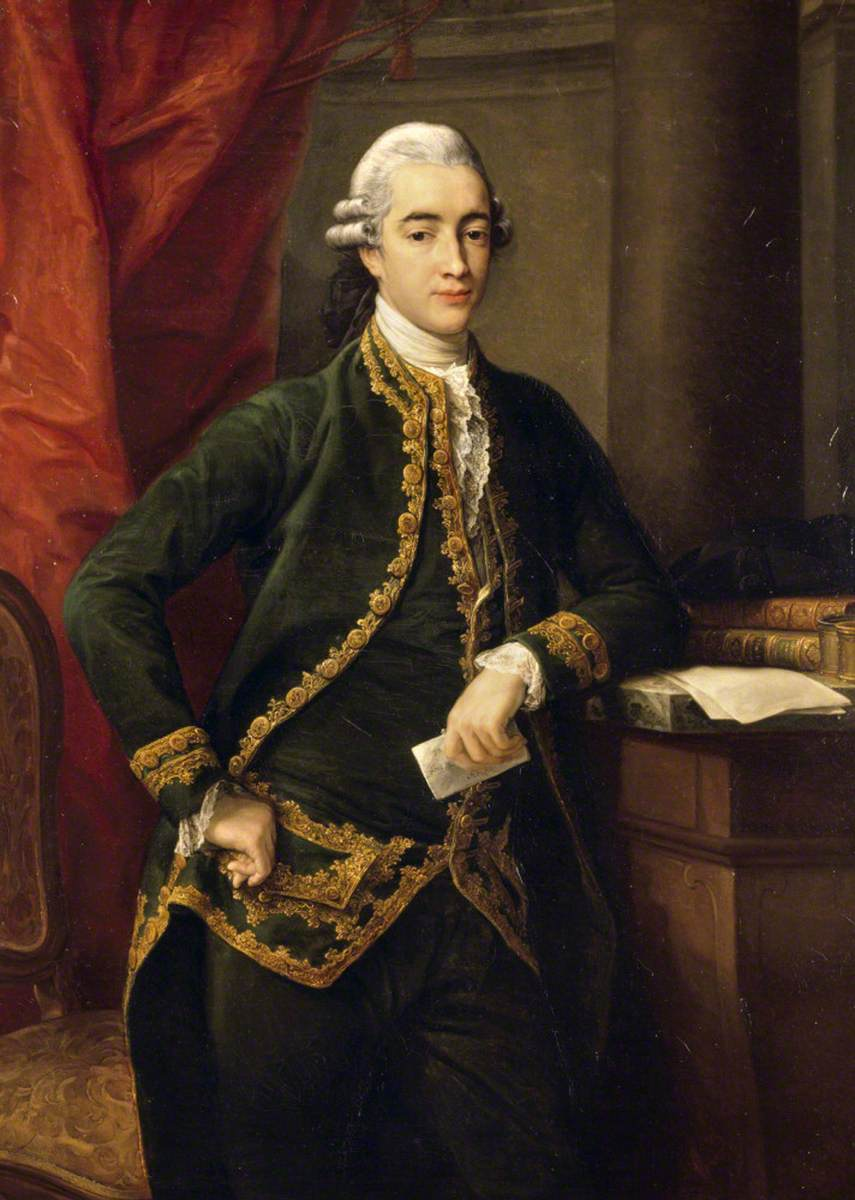
- Portrait by Pompeo Batoni, 1776
- Born: George Edward Henry Arthur Herbert; 7 July 1755; Finchley, London, Kingdom of Great Britain
- Died: 16 January 1801 (aged 45); York House Hotel, London, The United Kingdom of Great Britain and Ireland
- Buried: January 1801; St Mary's Church
- Noble family: Herbert
- Father: Henry Herbert, 1st Earl of Powis
- Mother: Barbara Herbert, Countess of Powis

George Edward Henry Arthur Herbert, 2nd Earl of Powis (7 July 1755 – 16 January 1801), styled Viscount Ludlow until 1772, was a British peer.

== Early life ==
Herbert was born at Finchley, Middlesex, the son of Henry Herbert, 1st Earl of Powis, by Barbara Herbert, daughter of Lord Edward Herbert. He was educated at Eton College.

== Career ==
He succeeded his father in the earldom in 1772 and was appointed Recorder of Ludlow and Lord Lieutenant of Montgomeryshire in 1776. Also in 1776 he served as treasurer of the Salop Infirmary in Shrewsbury. Powis was commissioned as Colonel to embody the Montgomeryshire Militia in 1778. In 1798 he was also made Lord Lieutenant of Shropshire; he was also appointed colonel of the Shropshire Militia in place of the Montgomeryshire. He retained both Lord-Lieutenancies until his death in 1801.

Lord Powis made a Grand Tour in Italy in 1775–76, when he probably acquired a collection of marble sculpture preserved at his family seat, Powis Castle. He added a ballroom but did little to maintain the house, visitor John Byng in 1784 ascribing its neglected state to his time spent "in the prodigalities of London and in driving high phaetons up St James's Street." At a later visit (1793) he wrote: "The present (grandly-descended peer) is a mean silly man, the bubble of his mistress (and of his steward consequently) who rarely comes here, to sneak for about a day or two."

== Personal life ==
Lord Powis died at the York House Hotel, Albemarle Street, London, in January 1801, aged 45, and was buried at St Mary's Church, Welshpool. He was unmarried and the titles died with him. His sister and heir, Lady Henrietta, married Edward Clive, 2nd Baron Clive, who was created Earl of Powis in 1804.

Political offices
Preceded by The Earl of Hertford	Lord Lieutenant of Montgomeryshire; 1776–1801	Vacant Title next held by The Earl of Powis
Preceded by The Lord Clive	Lord Lieutenant of Shropshire; 1798–1801	Vacant Title next held by The Earl of Powis
Peerage of Great Britain
Preceded by Henry Herbert	Earl of Powis; 1772–1801	Extinct
