= Christian Herbert, 6th Earl of Powis =

British barrister, soldier, Colonial service officer, and peer (1904–1988)

Christian Victor Charles Herbert, 6th Earl of Powis (28 May 1904 – 7 October 1988) was a British barrister, soldier, Colonial service officer, and peer.

In 1974, he became a member of the House of Lords by inheriting several peerages.

== Early life ==
Born in Lower Belgrave Street, Westminster, Powis was one of the sons of Col. Edward William Herbert and Beatrice Anne Williamson. His elder brother was Edward Herbert.

His grandfather was Robert Charles Herbert, a younger son of Edward Herbert, 2nd Earl of Powis, and Lucy Herbert, Countess of Powis. His maternal grandparents were Sir Hedworth Williamson, 8th Baronet, and Lady Elizabeth Liddell (a daughter of Henry Liddell, 1st Earl of Ravensworth).

He was educated at Oundle School, Trinity College, Cambridge, where he graduated BA, and University College London.

== Career ==
In 1932 Herbert was called to the bar from the Inner Temple, becoming a barrister. In the Second World War, he rose to the rank of Major in the Royal Army Ordnance Corps. After the war, he became a Colonial service officer and between 1947 and 1955 was successively private secretary to Gerald Hawkesworth, Ronald Garvey, and Patrick Muir Renison as Governors of British Honduras. In 1955, he remained with Renison when he was transferred to become Governor of British Guiana, then stayed in Georgetown as the Governor's secretary when Renison was succeeded by Ralph Grey. In 1964, Grey was transferred to become Governor of the Bahamas, and Herbert retired.

On 10 April 1953, by a Royal Warrant of Precedence, Herbert was advanced to the rank of the younger son of an earl, after his older brother Edward Herbert had become Earl of Powis on the death of a second cousin. On 15 January 1974, Herbert succeeded his brother as Earl of Powis, Viscount Clive of Ludlow, Baron Clive of Walcot, Baron Clive of Plassey, and Baron Powis, of Powis Castle, and Baron Herbert of Chirbury. By then, the family seat of Powis Castle had been given to the National Trust and the once-great estate of the Earls of Powis had been greatly reduced by inheritance tax. Nevertheless, by an arrangement with the new owners of the castle, Powis took up residence there until his death there in 1988.

== Personal life ==
Lord Powis died at Powis Castle in 1988. He was buried at Welshpool on 14 October 1988 by Alwyn Rice Jones, Bishop of St Asaph.

Peerage of the United Kingdom
| Preceded by Edward Herbert | Earl of Powis; 1974–1988 | Succeeded by George William Herbert |
