= Richard Herbert, Lord of Cherbury =

English politician (1557–1596)

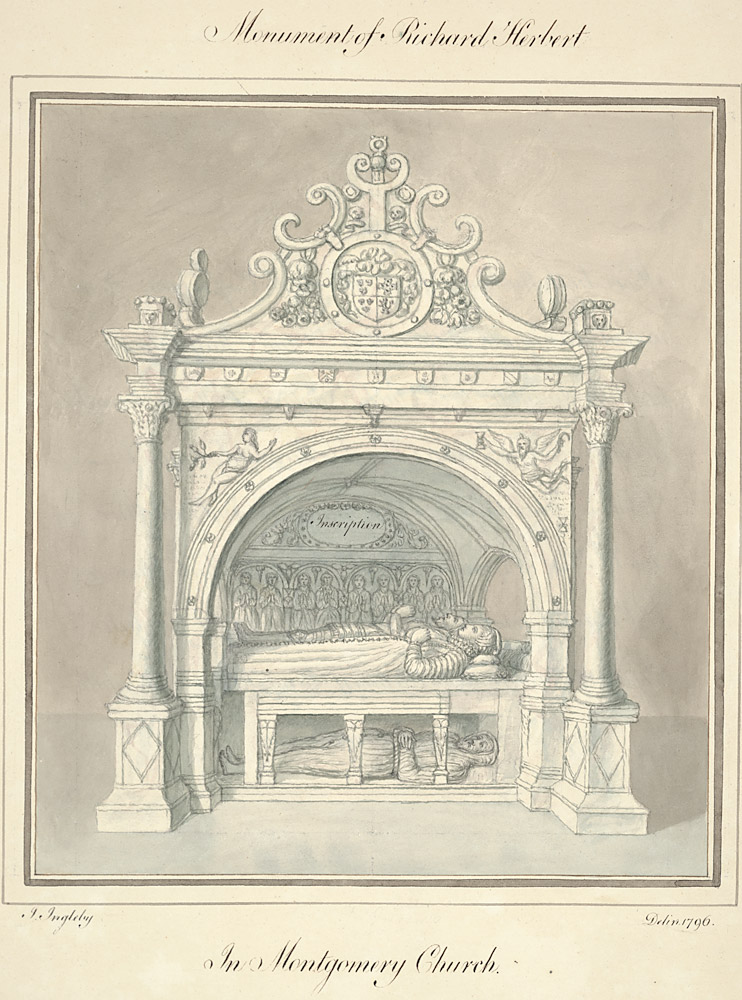
Monument of Richard Herbert in Montgomery Church, 1796

Richard Herbert (c. 1557-buried 15 October 1596), Lord of Cherbury (or Chirbury) in Shropshire, and of Montgomery Castle, was an English Justice of the Peace and Parliamentarian.

Richard was the eldest son of Edward Herbert (died 1593) through whom he was a member of a collateral branch of the family of the Earls of Pembroke. He was a law student at the Middle Temple in 1576.

He married Magdalen, daughter of Sir Richard Newport (died 1570) of High Ercall, Shropshire in 1581. His eldest son, Edward Herbert, 1st Baron Herbert of Cherbury was born on 3 March 1583 at Eyton on Severn near Wroxeter, Shropshire. Subsequent children were Elizabeth, Margaret, Richard, William, Charles, the poet George Herbert (born 3 April 1593), Henry (born 1594), Frances, and Thomas (born posthumously 1597). By 1593 the family had moved to Black Hall, a large, low house in a valley overlooked by Montgomery Castle.

He was Custos Rotulorum of Montgomeryshire in 1594–1596. He served as a member (MP) of the Parliament of England for Montgomery Boroughs in 1581 (as a substitute for a member allegedly dead but found to be 'in plain life') and for Montgomeryshire in 1584.

He succeeded to his father's estates in 1593. After his death in 1596 while his wife was pregnant with their tenth child, Richard Herbert was buried on 15 October in the parish church of Saint Nicholas, Montgomery. His family moved to Oxford and then to London.

His widow had a canopied tomb erected in Montgomery church in 1600. The tomb has effigies of Richard and Magdalen and it includes maquettes of eight of their children. Richard's heraldic symbols and his armour are included but his wife's heraldry and her dress are also on prominent display. The design also includes a cadaver to show that death happens and a painting of a naked woman and the effigy of Time are also included in the design. She subsequently remarried in 1609 to Sir John Danvers (c.1585-1655) and died in 1627.

Political offices
| Preceded by Edward Herbert | Custos Rotulorum of Montgomeryshire; 1594–1596 | Succeeded by Richard Broughton |
