= Edward Herbert (died 1593) =

English politician

Edward Herbert (c. 1513 – 30 April 1593), of Chirbury, Shropshire, England, and Montgomery, Wales, was a politician and head of the Herbert family. He was the first son of Sir Richard Herbert and his second wife, Anne Herbert. His brothers included William and John Herbert, both sheriffs of Montgomeryshire. He married Elizabeth Herbert, née Price, and had four sons by her, including Matthew and Richard Herbert, as well as at least three illegitimate sons. Through Richard, he was the grandfather of Edward Herbert, 1st Baron Herbert of Cherbury, a soldier, diplomat, historian, poet and religious philosopher, and George Herbert, a famous metaphysical poet and priest. Through his father, he was a grandson of the Welsh knight Richard Herbert of Coldbrook.

Having inherited his father's estate in 1539, he lived "gaily and expensively" at court, before entering military service. In 1549, he served under the command of his cousin, Sir William Herbert in the suppression of the Prayer Book Rebellion, and in 1554 of Wyatt's rebellion. In 1557, he commanded 500 men in the Battle of St. Quentin.

He was a Member (MP) of the Parliament of England for Montgomeryshire in March 1553, October 1553, April 1554, November 1554, 1558, 1559, 1563, 1571 and 1589 - every parliament, that is, save that of 1555, after being absent from the preceding one when it was called, along with 100 other members, and he was consequently fined 53s. 4d. As late as 1585, he was considered to be a Roman Catholic by an adherent of Mary, Queen of Scots.

He served in local government as Deputy Constable of Aberystwyth Castle in 1544; Sheriff of Cardiganshire 1546-47, of Breconshire 1549-50 and of Montgomeryshire in 1551-52, 1556–57 and 1567–68; Keeper of Holt Castle, Denbighshire, in 1570; and Bailiff (precursor mayor) of the borough of Montgomery in 1574 and 1582.

He built himself a mansion, called Llys-mawr in Welsh and Blackhall in English, which was renowned during his lifetime for its hospitality; his grandson Edward recorded that "It was an ordinary saying in the countrey at that time, when they saw any fowl rise, 'Fly where thou wilt, thou wilt light at Black-hall". The Herbert family had not been long established in Montgomery during his lifetime; by the time of his death, it was unquestionably the wealthiest and most powerful family in the neighbourhood, and would remain so for generations.
