= Henry Herbert, 1st Earl of Powis =

British peer and politician

The Right Honourable The Earl of Powis PC
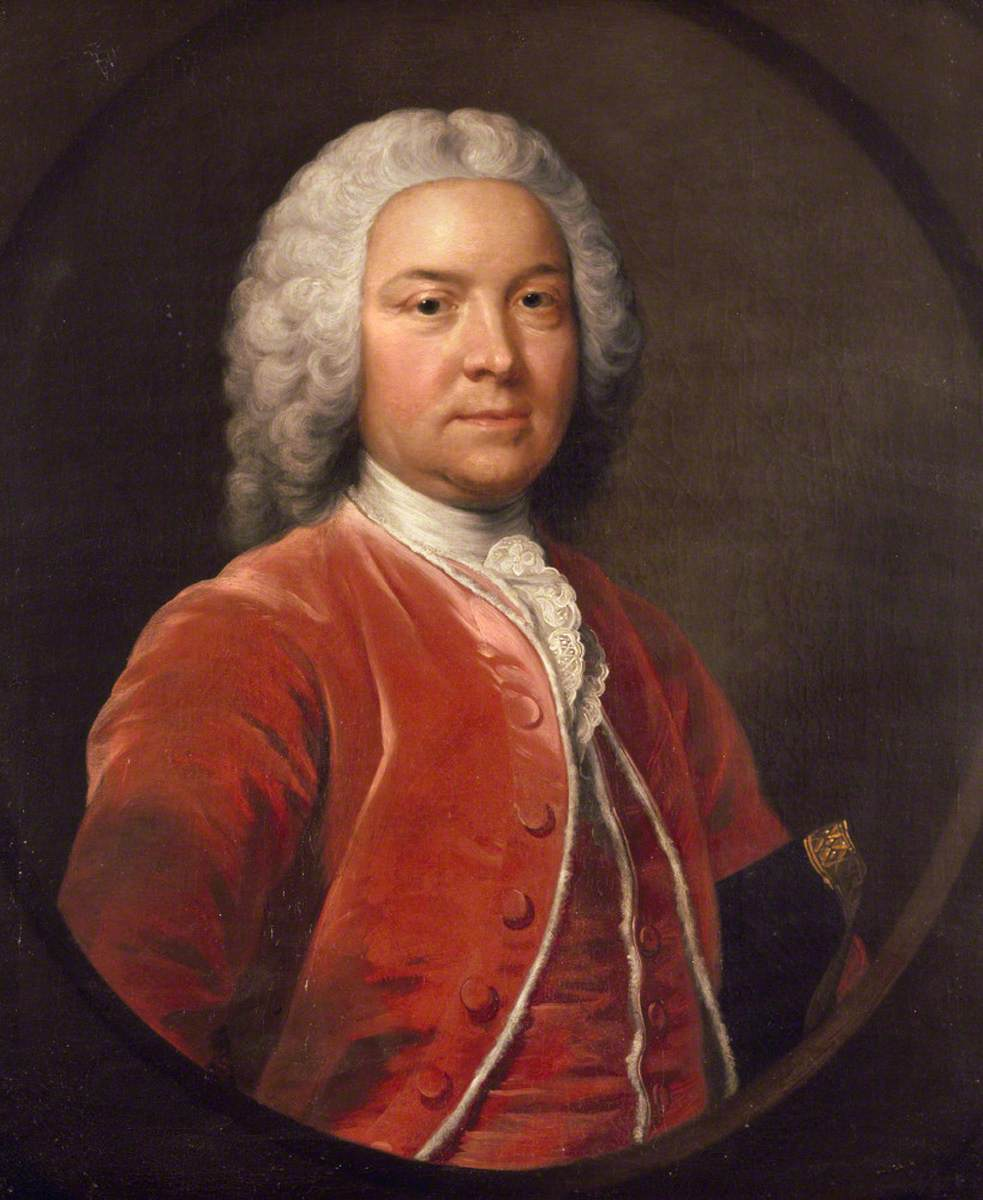
- Portrait of Henry Arthur Herbert, 1st Earl of Powis (2nd Creation) circa 1740

Comptroller of the Household
- In office 1761–1761
- Preceded by: The Lord Edgcumbe
- Succeeded by: Lord George Cavendish

Personal details
- Born: before 9 April 1703
- Died: 10 September 1772 (aged 69) Bath, Somerset, England
- Resting place: St Mary's Church, Welshpool
- Spouse: Barbara Herbert (m. 1751)
- Children: George Herbert, 2nd Earl of Powis; Henrietta Clive, Countess of Powis
- Parent(s): Francis Herbert; Florence Herbert
- Occupation: Politician, peer

Henry Arthur Herbert, 1st Earl of Powis PC (before 9 April 1703 – 10 September 1772), known as Henry Herbert until 1743 and as the Lord Herbert of Chirbury between 1743 and 1748, was a British peer and politician.

== Background ==
A member of the Herbert family, he was the son of Francis Herbert, of Oakly Park near Ludlow, Shropshire, son of Richard Herbert by his wife and second cousin once removed, Florence, daughter of Richard Herbert, 2nd Baron Herbert of Chirbury. His mother was Dorothy, daughter of John Oldbury, a merchant of London. He was baptised at the parish church of Bromfield near Oakly Park.

== Political career ==
Herbert was returned to parliament as a Whig for Bletchingley in 1724, a seat he held until 1727, and then represented Ludlow until 1743. In 1735 he became Custos Rotulorum of Montgomeryshire and Lord-Lieutenant of Shropshire, and was Treasurer to the Prince of Wales (father of George III) from 1737 to 1738. In 1743 he was elevated to the peerage as Baron Herbert of Chirbury, in the County of Shropshire, a revival of the title (spelt "Cherbury") which had been held in his family from 1629 until becoming extinct on the death of a son of his great-grandfather in 1691. Five years later he was created Baron Powis, of Powis Castle in the County of Montgomery, Viscount Ludlow, in the County of Shropshire, and Earl of Powis, in the County of Montgomery, a revival of the Powis title which had become extinct on the death of the third Marquess of Powis the same year. The following year he was also made Baron Herbert of Chirbury and Ludlow, with remainder to firstly his brother Richard Herbert and secondly to his kinsman Francis Herbert, of Ludlow.

In 1761 Lord Powis relinquished his position as Lord-Lieutenant of Shropshire and was appointed Lord-Lieutenant of Montgomeryshire instead, but he was reinstated to the Lord-Lieutenancy of Shropshire in 1764 and held both posts until his death eight years later. Also in 1761 he was appointed Comptroller of the Household and sworn of the Privy Council. He was promoted to Treasurer of the Household later the same year, a post he held until 1765.

== Military positions ==
During the time of the Jacobite rising of 1745, when Prince Charles Edward Stuart's Scots army was about to invade England, Powis was commissioned as Colonel on 1 October that year to raise a Regiment of Foot in Shropshire to counter the invasion. They were ordered to march into Staffordshire but, being insufficiently disciplined and manned, they fell back without joining battle against the Jacobite troops who were feared to be heading for Wales but diverted towards Derby instead.

Powis never saw active service but he was given further promotions as Major-General in 1755, Lieutenant-General in 1759, and full General in 1772, the year of his death.

== Family ==
In 1751, he married the fifteen-year-old Barbara Herbert, posthumous daughter and heiress of Lord Edward Herbert, younger son of William Herbert, 2nd Marquess of Powis, and brother of William Herbert, 3rd Marquess of Powis. Lord and Lady Powis had two children:

- George Edward Henry Arthur Herbert, 2nd Earl of Powis (1755–1801); died unmarried.
- Lady Henrietta Antonia Herbert (1758–1830); married Edward Clive, 2nd Baron Clive, who was later created Earl of Powis, and had issue.

== Later life and death ==
Oakly Park was his main country home until 1771, when he sold it to Lord Clive ('Clive of India') and moved into Powis Castle, the seat of his Earldom, near Welshpool, Montgomeryshire.

Lord Powis died at Bath, Somerset, in September 1772 aged 69, and was buried in St Mary's Church, Welshpool. He was succeeded by his son, George (who also succeeded in the barony of Herbert of Chirbury and Ludlow as the persons in special remainder to that peerage had died before Lord Powis). The earldom became extinct on the latter's death in 1801.

Lord Powis's daughter, Lady Henrietta, married Edward Clive, 2nd Baron Clive, son of Robert Clive, 1st Baron Clive ("Clive of India"). In 1804, the Earldom of Powis was revived in favour of Edward Clive. Barbara, Countess of Powis, died in March 1786, aged 50.

Parliament of Great Britain
Preceded by George Evelyn; William Clayton	Member of Parliament for Bletchingley; 1724–1727; With: William Clayton	Succeeded by William Clayton; Sir Orlando Bridgeman, Bt
Preceded by Abel Ketelby; Richard Herbert	Member of Parliament for Ludlow; 1727–1743; With: Richard Herbert 1727–1741; Sir William Corbet, Bt 1741–1743	Succeeded by Sir William Corbet, Bt; Richard Herbert
Political offices
Preceded by The Lord Edgcumbe	Comptroller of the Household; 1761	Succeeded by Lord George Cavendish
Preceded by The Earl of Thomond	Treasurer of the Household; 1761–1765	Succeeded by The Lord Edgcumbe
Honorary titles
Preceded by The Earl of Bradford	Lord-Lieutenant of Shropshire; 1735–1761	Succeeded by The Earl of Bath
Preceded by The Earl of Bradford	Custos Rotulorum of Montgomeryshire; 1735–1772	Succeeded by The Lord Clive
Preceded by The Earl of Cholmondeley	Lord-Lieutenant of Montgomeryshire; 1761–1772	Succeeded by The Lord Clive
Preceded by The Earl of Bath	Lord-Lieutenant of Shropshire; 1764–1772	Succeeded by The Lord Clive
Peerage of Great Britain
New creation	Earl of Powis; 1748–1772	Succeeded by George Herbert
New creation	Baron Herbert of Chirbury; 1743–1772	Succeeded by George Herbert
New creation	Baron Herbert of Chirbury and Ludlow; 1749–1772	Succeeded by George Herbert
