= Edward Clive, 1st Earl of Powis =

British politician

The Right Honourable The Earl of Powis PC
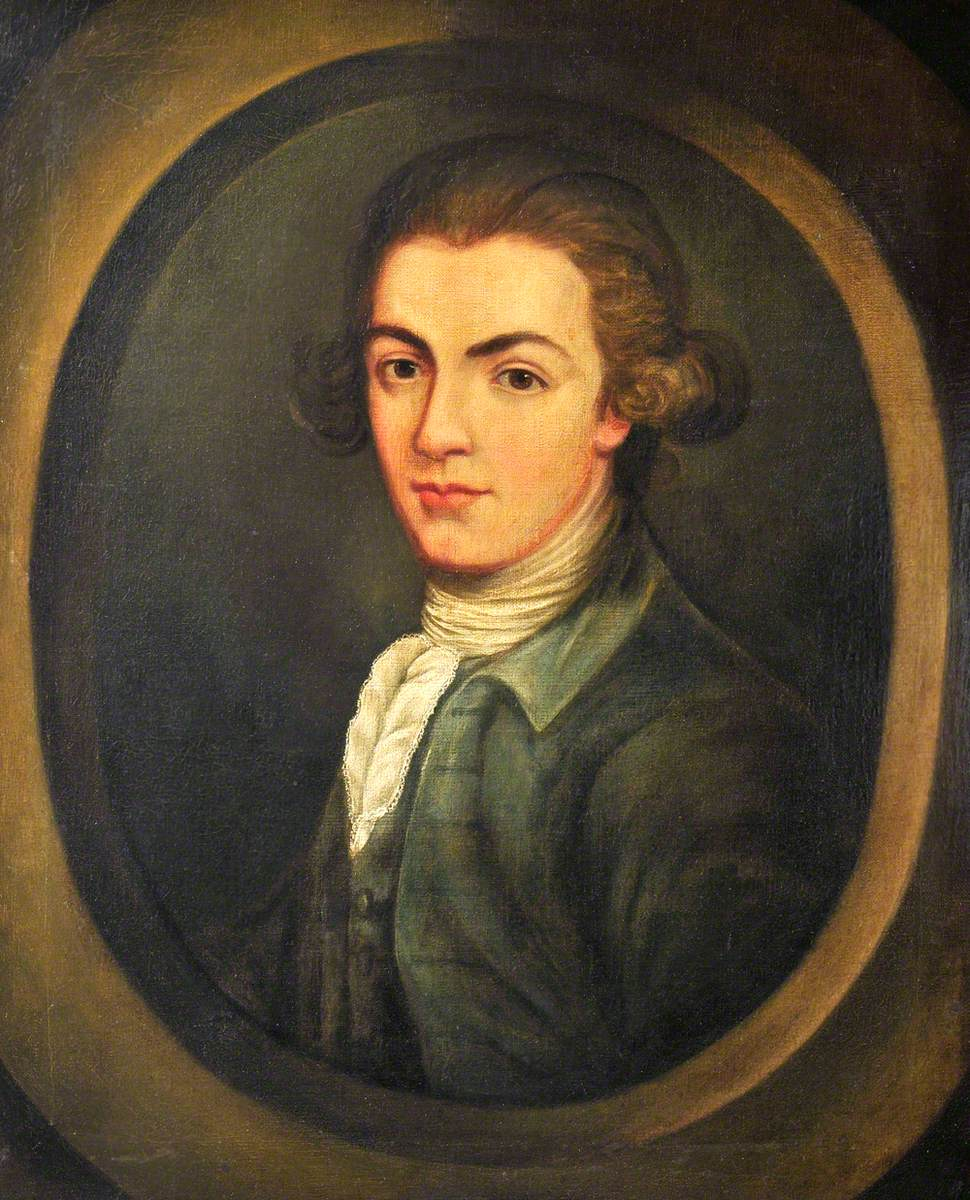

Lord Lieutenant of Ireland
- In office 21 November 1805 – 12 March 1806
- Monarch: George III
- Preceded by: The Earl of Hardwicke
- Succeeded by: The Duke of Bedford

Personal details
- Born: 7 March 1754 Queen Square, Bloomsbury, London, England
- Died: 16 May 1839 (aged 85) 45 Berkeley Square, London, England
- Resting place: Bromfield Parish Church
- Spouse: Lady Henrietta Herbert (m. 1784; died 1830)
- Children: Lady Henrietta Williams-Wynn; Edward Herbert, 2nd Earl of Powis; Charlotte Percy, Duchess of Northumberland; Robert Clive
- Parent(s): Robert Clive, 1st Baron Clive; Margaret Maskelyne
- Education: Eton College; Christ Church, Oxford

Edward Clive, 1st Earl of Powis, PC (7 March 1754 – 16 May 1839), known as the Lord Clive between 1774 and 1804, was a British politician who sat in the House of Commons from 1774 to 1794 when he was raised to the peerage of Great Britain as Baron Clive.

== Early life ==
Powis was the eldest son of Robert Clive, 1st Baron Clive ("Clive of India"), and Margaret born Maskelyne. He was born at Queen Square, Bloomsbury, London, and he was educated at Eton College and Christ Church, Oxford.

== Political career ==
Clive succeeded his father as Baron Clive of Plassey, County Clare in 1774. However, as this was an Irish peerage, it did not entitle him to a seat in the British House of Lords (although it did entitle him to a seat in the Irish House of Lords). At the 1774 general election he was elected as member of parliament for Ludlow, a seat he held until 1794. He was a member of the Board of Agriculture in 1793.

On 13 August 1794, Clive was created Baron Clive, of Walcot in the County of Shropshire, in the Peerage of Great Britain, and consequently took his seat in the House of Lords. Almost certainly this was a belated act of contrition by the Crown for the lack of recognition to his father.

In 1797, he was placed in charge of the Shropshire Militia, which was the first English militia to be posted in Scotland, to address potential civil unrest. A force of 1000 men, they arrived at Musselburgh on 21 September 1797 and the company were billeted in Dalkeith until 9 October, after which they moved to Edinburgh, the main seat of possible unrest and home of previous disturbance such as the Dundas Riots. On arrival in Edinburgh they were inspected at St Anne's Yard by Lord Adam Gordon in his capacity as Commander in Chief of the Scottish Armies.

Clive had a distinguished career in India where he was Governor of Madras from 1798 to 1803, returning home to the thanks of both Houses of Parliament.

On 14 May 1804, he was further created Baron Powis of Powis Castle co Montgomery, Baron Herbert of Chirbury, County Shropshire, Viscount Clive of Ludlow, County Shropshire, and Earl of Powis, County Montgomeryshire, a revival of the title which had become extinct on the death of his brother-in-law, George Herbert, 2nd Earl of Powis, in 1801.

Edward Clive also served as Lord Lieutenant of Shropshire from 1775 to 1798 and from 1804 to 1839 and as Lord Lieutenant of Montgomeryshire from 1804 to 1830. He was Recorder of the boroughs of Shrewsbury in 1775, and Ludlow in 1801.

He was colonel of the Shropshire Militia in 1775 and of the South Shropshire Militia in 1809; along with the other militia colonels he was granted brevet rank as colonel in the British Army in 1794.

== Family ==
Before his elevation to the Earldom of Powis, he married Lady Henrietta Herbert of Powis Castle, daughter of Henry Herbert, 1st Earl of Powis, in 1784. Their children were:

- Lady Henrietta Antonia Herbert (d. 1835); married Sir Watkin Williams-Wynn, 5th Baronet.
- Edward Herbert, 2nd Earl of Powis (1785–1848), who inherited Powis Castle
- Lady Charlotte Florentia Herbert (1787–1866); married Hugh Percy, 3rd Duke of Northumberland, and was the governess of the future Queen Victoria.
- Robert Henry Clive (1798–1854); a politician. m Lady Harriet Windsor, 13th Baroness Windsor

Lord Powis lived at Walcot, Shropshire, an estate purchased by his father from the Walcot family in 1764.

Lady Powis died on 3 June 1830, aged 71. Lord Powis survived her by nine years and died at his London home, 45 Berkeley Square, on 16 May 1839, aged 85. He was buried at Bromfield Parish Church, near his Oakly Park property. His obituary in the Annual Register calls him:

Remarkable for his physical vigour, and though he spent some years in India and lived freely, he might be seen, when about eighty, digging in his garden at six o'clock in the morning in his shirt sleeves. He was apparently well the day before his death.

Parliament of Great Britain
Preceded by William Fellowes; Thomas Herbert	Member of Parliament for Ludlow; 1774–1794; With: Viscount Villiers (1774–1780); Frederick Cornewall (1780–1783); Somerset Davies (1783–1784); Richard Payne Knight (1784–1790)	Succeeded by Richard Payne Knight; Robert Clive
Political offices
Preceded by The Earl of Hardwicke	Lord Lieutenant of Ireland; 1805–1806	Succeeded by The Duke of Bedford
Honorary titles
Preceded by The Lord Clive	Lord Lieutenant of Shropshire; 1775–1798	Succeeded by The 2nd Earl of Powis
Vacant Title last held by The 2nd Earl of Powis	Lord Lieutenant of Shropshire; 1804–1839	Succeeded by The Duke of Sutherland
Vacant Title last held by The 2nd Earl of Powis	Lord Lieutenant of Montgomeryshire; 1804–1830	Succeeded by Viscount Clive
Peerage of the United Kingdom
New creation	Earl of Powis; 1804–1839	Succeeded by Edward Herbert
Peerage of Great Britain
New creation	Baron Clive; 1794–1839	Succeeded by Edward Herbert
Peerage of Ireland
Preceded by Robert Clive	Baron Clive; 1774–1839	Succeeded by Edward Herbert
