= St Mary's Church, Welshpool =

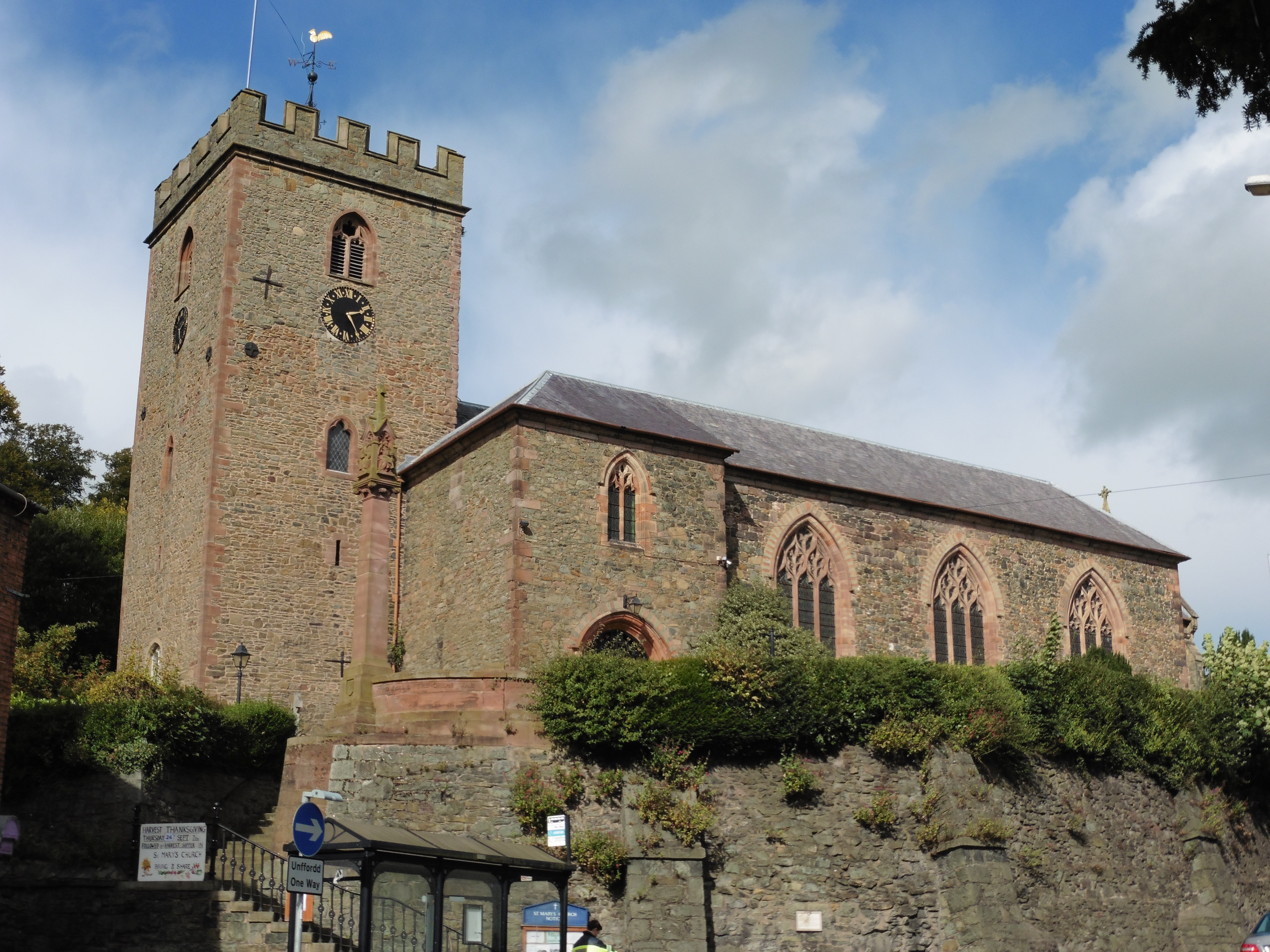
- St Mary's Church, Welshpool
- 52.661097°N 3.146442°W
- Location: Welshpool, Powys
- Country: Wales
- Denomination: Church in Wales

History
- Status: Church
- Dedication: Saint Mary

Architecture
- Functional status: Active
- Heritage designation: Grade I
- Architect: George Edmund Street
- Style: Gothic Revival
- Years built: c. 1250; rebuilt in 1870

Administration
- Province: Wales
- Diocese: St Asaph

St Mary's Church, Welshpool, in the Diocese of St Asaph, is the Anglican parish church of Welshpool, Powys, Wales. The church is a Grade I listed building.

St Cynfelin (also known as St Matu) is reputed to be the founder of St Mary's, during Age of the Saints in the 5th and 6th centuries.

The church was originally built c. 1250, but only the lower courses of the tower now remain from that date. The current building is largely as rebuilt or restored in 1871 by George Edmund Street. The nave was rebuilt in the 16th century, and with the whole building was substantially restored in 1871.

The 15th century chancel ceiling may have come from Strata Marcella Abbey, about five miles away, and a stone in the churchyard is said to have been part of the abbot's throne. A memorial in the church commemorates Bishop William Morgan, translator of the Bible into Welsh, who was the vicar from 1575 to 1579.

Adam of Usk was a priest at St Mary's in 1411.

The churchyard contains seven Commonwealth war graves, of five British soldiers of World War I and a soldier and airman of World War II.

== See also ==
- Christ Church, Welshpool
