= William Herbert, 3rd Marquess of Powis =

English peer

William Herbert, 3rd Marquess of Powis (1698 – 8 March 1748), styled Viscount Montgomery until 1745, was an English peer.

The only son of William Herbert, 2nd Marquess of Powis and his wife Mary, he succeeded his father as Marquess of Powis in 1745. He died three years later, and the Marquessate and its subsidiary titles became extinct. He left his fortune to his heir-male, Lord Herbert of Chirbury; three years later, he married the Marquess' niece, Barbara, who inherited the entailed estates of the family.

Peerage of England
Preceded by William Herbert	Marquess of Powis; 1745–1748	Extinct
