= Percy Herbert, 2nd Baron Powis =

English writer and politician

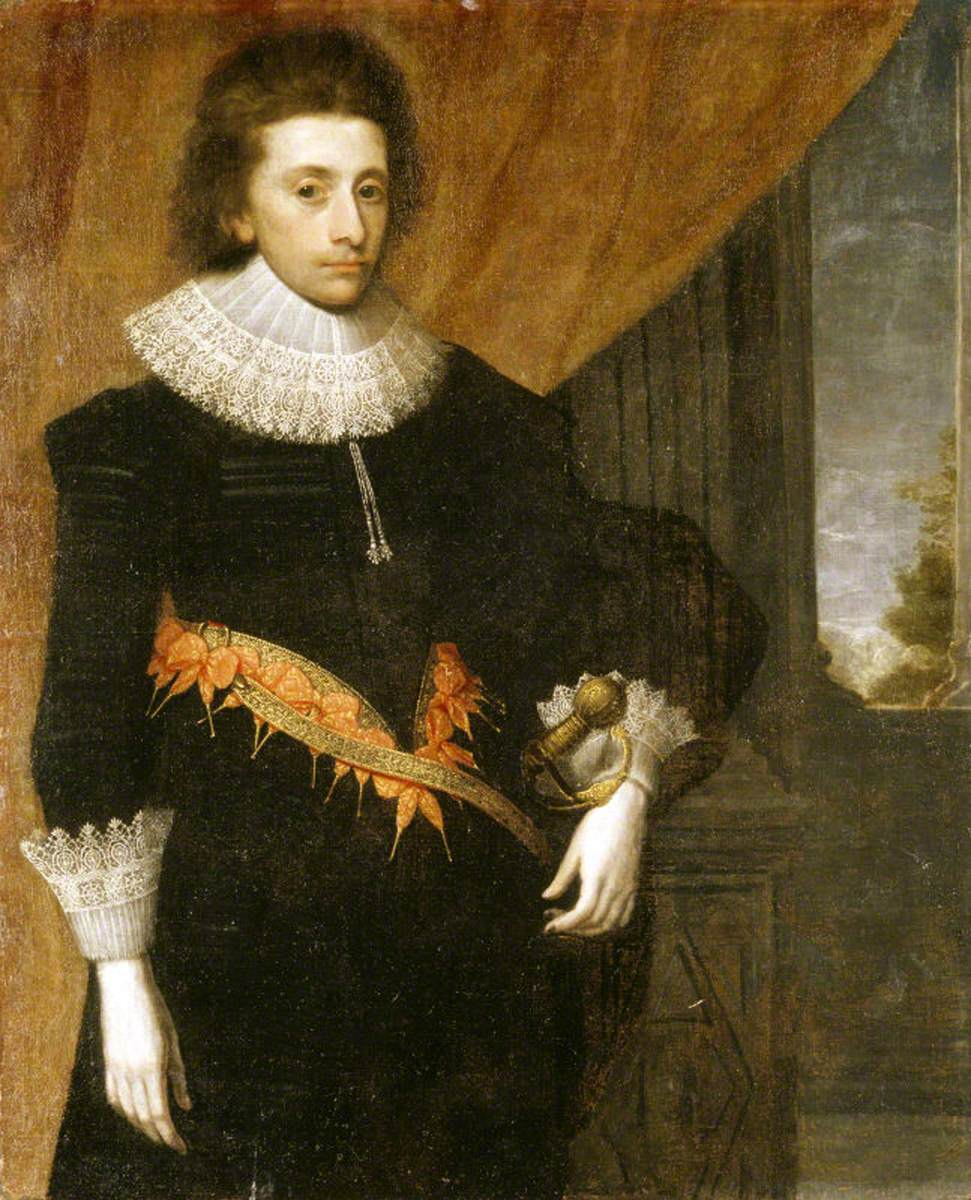

Percy Herbert, 2nd Baron Powis (1598 – 19 January 1667), known as Sir Percy Herbert, Bt, between 1622 and 1655, was an English writer and politician who sat in the House of Commons from 1621 to 1622 and later inherited a peerage.

Herbert was the son of William Herbert, 1st Baron Powis, and his wife Eleanor Percy (d. 1650). He was named after the surname of his maternal grandfather Henry Percy, 8th Earl of Northumberland and belonged to a recusant (i. e. Roman Catholic) branch of the Herbert family living in Powis Castle.

In 1621 Herbert was elected member of parliament for Shaftesbury at a by-election after the previously elected member was expelled. He was knighted on 7 November 1622, and was created a baronet on 16 November 1622. Herbert inherited the title Baron Powis on the death of his father in 1655.

== Marriage and issue ==
On 19 November 1622 Herbert married Elizabeth Craven (bap. 1600, d. 1662), first surviving daughter of Sir William Craven (c.1545–1618), converting her to Catholicism. Their only son William Herbert, 1st Marquess of Powis became the 1st Earl of Powis and then 1st Marquess of Powis.

Parliament of England
Preceded by William Beecher; Thomas Sheppard	Member of Parliament for Shaftesbury; 1621–1622; With: Ralph Hopton	Succeeded by William Whitaker; John Thoroughgood
Baronetage of England
New creation	Baronet (of Red Castle); 1622–1667	Succeeded by William Herbert
Peerage of England
Preceded by William Herbert	Baron Powis; 1655–1667	Succeeded by William Herbert
