= Richard Herbert (died 1510) =

Knight

Sir Richard Herbert
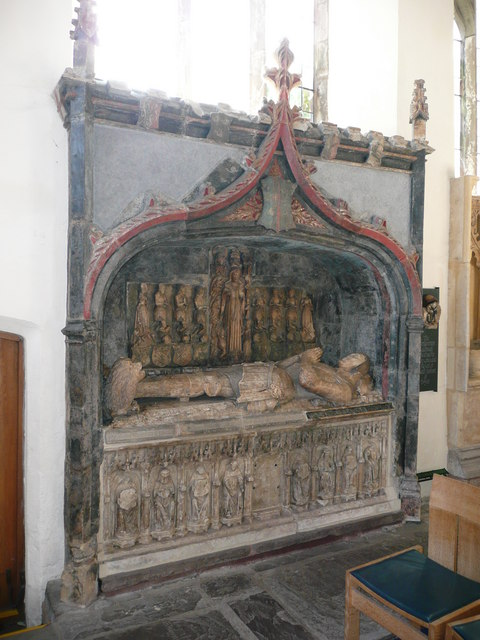
- Tomb of Sir Richard Herbert of Ewyas
- Died: between 2 and 12 September 1510
- Occupations: Knight, Gentleman, Courtier
- Title: Sir
- Spouse: Margaret Cradock
- Children: 3, including William Herbert, 1st Earl of Pembroke
- Parent(s): William Herbert, 1st Earl of Pembroke; Maud ap Howell Graunt (Gwynn)

Arms of Sir Richard Herbert (d. 1510) of Ewyas, Herefordshire: Herbert (Per pale azure and gules, three lions rampant argent), differenced by a bordure componée gules bezantée and or, to reflect his illegitimacy. The differenced arms were borne by his son William Herbert, 1st Earl of Pembroke (c.1501–1570) and grandson Henry Herbert, 2nd Earl of Pembroke (c. 1539–1601), but the difference was dropped by later earls, who bore Herbert undifferenced

Sir Richard Herbert (died 1510) of Ewyas, Herefordshire, was a Welsh knight, gentleman, landowner, and courtier. He was an illegitimate son of William Herbert, 1st Earl of Pembroke (1423–1469), and Maud ap Howell Graunt, a daughter of Adam ap Howell Graunt (Gwynn). Richard had a full brother named George.

Richard Herbert of Ewyas should not be confused with his uncle, Sir Richard Herbert of Coldbrook.

== Herbert legacy ==
The titles and estates of the Earl of Pembroke descended to Herbert's younger, legitimate half-brother William, but he achieved notability through his own merit and through his descendants: "Sir Richard Herbert, of Ewyas, who, though illegitimate, is ancestor of the men who have really, in modern times, rendered the name of Herbert illustrious."

In 1465, Richard Herbert was granted Westminster, manors of Grove, Radnore, Mookas, Brutescourt, Throuckeston, Westhide, Egelton, Redehire, Howton and Wormeton Tirell, in Herefordshire.

He was successful as a Gentleman Usher to King Henry VII and was appointed Constable and Porter of Abergavenny Castle on 22 July 1509. While Herbert is most often named as "Sir Richard Herbert," there is uncertainty as to whether he was knighted. In "The Knights of England", there is a record of a Richard Herbert being knighted in 1513, but that was three years after this man's death. According to Sil, Richard was never knighted, but was an Esquire. Richard is entitled Esquire in 1465, when he was granted manors and lands. However, other sources call him "Sir Richard Herbert", and an article entitled "The Family of Herbert" in The Gentleman's Magazine states that he was knighted by King Henry VIII, in which case as he died in 1510 he would have been knighted in the last year of his life, and the first year of Henry VIII's reign, which began in 1509.

== Marriage ==
Richard married Margaret, a daughter of Sir Matthew Cradock of Swansea and of Alice (or Jane) Mancell, widow of John Malefant. Sir Matthew Cradock was receiver of Glamorgan, through whom Castleston Castle passed to his daughter Margaret and Richard Herbert.

== Issue ==
Richard and Margaret Herbert had three surviving sons, one of whom was William Herbert, 1st Earl of Pembroke (1501–1570), who was created Earl of Pembroke (of the second creation) on 11 October 1551. Later Earls of Pembroke and Montgomery, and of Carnarvon, and the Dukes of Powis, of Pool Castle (extinct 1747), descend from Sir Richard Herbert. Through a female line the Marquis of Bute derives his Glamorganshire estates. Herbert's son William married Anne Parr, sister of Queen Catherine Parr, the sixth and last wife of Henry VIII. William served Henry VIII in many capacities, including Chief Gentleman of the Privy Chamber, Privy Councillor, and Receiver of the King's revenues. He was knighted in 1544 and later appointed a Knight of the Garter. Another son was Sir George Herbert of Swansea, who was ancestor of the Herberts of Swansea, Cogan, Cookham, and the White Friars, who became extinct in 1739. Candleston Castle passed from Richard and Margaret to their son George.

Richard was also the father of the illegitimate Herberts of Dinas Powis and Hengastell.

== Death ==
Richard Herbert died between 2 and 12 September 1510 and was buried in Abergavenny Church; his tomb has a lavishly decorated wall arch and an alabaster effigy.
