= John Charleton =

John Charleton is the name of:

- John Charleton, 1st Baron Cherleton (1268–1353), British baron
- John Charleton, 2nd Baron Cherleton (c. 1300–1360), British baron
- John Charleton, 3rd Baron Cherleton (c. 1336–1374), British baron
- John Charleton, 4th Baron Cherleton (1362–1401), British baron
