= Baron Charlton =

Abeyant title in the Peerage of England

Arms of Charlton: Or, a lion gules

Baron Charlton (also Charleton, Cherleton) is an abeyant title in the Peerage of England. It was created in 1313 when John Charlton was summoned to Parliament. The Charlton family were a Shropshire knightly family (with lands in Charlton near Wellington, Shropshire), one of whom married Hawise "Gadarn" the heiress of the Lordship of Powys. This was the former Welsh Principality of Powys Wenwynwyn, which had as a result of the last prince's submission to Edward I been transformed into a marcher lordship. The title fell into abeyance on the death of the fifth Baron in 1421.

== Barons Cherleton (1313) ==
- John Charlton, 1st Baron Charlton (1268–1353) married Hawise "Gadarn", heiress of Powys Wenwynwyn
- John Charlton, 2nd Baron Charlton (died 1360)
- John Charlton, 3rd Baron Charlton (1334 – 13 July 1374)
- John Charlton, 4th Baron Charlton (1362–1401)
- Edward Charlton, 5th Baron Charlton (1370–1421)

On his death the title fell into abeyance between his daughters and heiresses:

- Joan wife of John Grey, 1st Earl of Tankerville
- Joyce wife of John Tiptoft, 1st Baron Tiptoft
