= John Charlton, 4th Baron Charlton =

John Charleton

Baron Cherleton Lord Charlton of Powys
- Tenure: 1374–1401
- Predecessor: John Charleton, 3rd Baron Cherleton
- Successor: Edward Charleton, 5th Baron Cherleton
- Born: 25 April 1362
- Died: 19 October 1401 (aged 39); Castle of Pool, Poole, Dorset, England
- Spouse: Alice FitzAlan
- Father: John Charlton, 3rd Baron Charlton
- Mother: Joan de Stafford

Arms of Cherleton: Or, a lion gules

John Charlton (also Cherleton or Charleton), 4th Baron Charlton of Powys (25 April 1362 – 19 October 1401) was an English noble.

John Charlton was the elder son of Joan de Stafford (a daughter of Ralph Stafford, 1st Earl of Stafford) and John Charleton, 3rd Baron Cherleton. He was part of a wide network of Marcher lords whose families intermarried across the Welsh and English borders, feuding and building alliances between them through marriage, inheritance and warfare. His paternal grandparents were of John Charleton, 2nd Baron Cherleton (d. 1360) and his wife, Maud Mortimer, daughter of heiress Joan de Geneville, 2nd Baroness Geneville and Roger Mortimer, 1st Earl of March who deposed King Edward II of England in partnership with Isabella of France.

He succeeded to the titles of 4th Baron Cherleton and 4th Lord of Powys (Feudal baron) on 13 July 1374, on the death of his father, John Charleton, 3rd Baron Cherleton, and held the office of Justice of North Wales from 20 March 1387.

He married Alice FitzAlan, daughter of Richard FitzAlan, 11th Earl of Arundel and Elizabeth de Bohun, before March 1392, without issue.

His last will was dated 1395. He died on 19 October 1401, aged 39, at Powis Castle, Welshpool, which had become the family seat through his paternal grandmother Hawys Gadarn (1291 – c. 1353), daughter of Joan Corbet and Owen de la Pole, the last Prince of Powys, making her the heiress to the former Welsh kingdom of Powys Wenwynwyn in Wales.

As he had no children, he was succeeded in the barony and lordship by his younger brother, Edward, as the 5th Baron Charlton.

Peerage of England
Preceded by John Charlton	Baron Charlton; 1374–1401	Succeeded by Edward Charlton
