= Flag of Montgomeryshire =

Montgomeryshire (option 1)
- Proportion: 3:5
- Adopted: Not yet adopted
- Design: Sable three nags' heads erased argent
- Designed by: Based on the later attributed arms of King Brochwel

Montgomeryshire (option 2)
- 'The Lion of Powys'
- Proportion: 2:3
- Adopted: Not yet adopted
- Design: Or, a rampant lion gules, armed and langued azure
- Designed by: Historic

The Montgomeryshire flag (Welsh: Baner Sir Drefaldwyn) refers to proposals for a flag of the Welsh county of Montgomeryshire. Neither has been registered with the Flag Institute.

== History ==
There are two rival designs for the flag which are both based on historic armorial devices.

One concept for the flag is a banner of the arms of Brochwel Ysgithrog, famed for his resistance to the invading Saxons. In the medieval period a coat of arms was created for him bearing three white horse heads on a black field. This represented the Saxon white horses, with their heads severed, and thus symbolised his victory over the Saxons at Chester. The arms granted to the local council in 1951 included a black-and-white border as a reference to Brochwel's arms.

The other concept for the flag is the banner of arms of the former Welsh Kingdom of Powys which had been in use by the kings of Powys since the reign of Bleddyn ap Cynfyn in 1046. In 1160 the kingdom divided in two with the larger, southern portion that was known alternately as "Upper Powys", "Powys Cyfeiliog" or Powys Wenwynwyn (the boundaries of which matched those of the historic county of Montgomeryshire almost exactly) continuing to use the same banner as the former unitary realm of Powys had. In 1283 the whole territory of Upper Powys became a feudal fief subject to the King of England known as the Lordship of Powis. The Lords of Powis continued to use the old banner of Powys for their personal arms and, as such, the banner continued to be associated with the territory, until at least 1421 when ownership of the lordship passed outside the Anglo-Welsh Charleton family. In 1573 the Lordship was transformed into the County of Montgomeryshire by the Laws in Wales Acts however there is compelling evidence that the shire continued to be popularly represented by the banner of arms of Powys because a book published in 1894 illustrates the shields of the counties of Wales and shows Montgomeryshire using a red lion device and the motto 'POWYS PARADWYS CYMRU'. In 1951 the County Council was formally granted official arms which featured the Arms of Powys (the red lion on gold) most prominently. This design however suffers from the fact that it may be too similar to the existing flag used for the English county of Somerset. Ultimately, the county flag will be adopted taking a number of criteria into account, including historic precedent, distinctiveness and how the flag will look when flying.
