= Greyfriars, Shrewsbury =

Friary in Shropshire, England

Coordinates: 52.7049°N 2.7494°W

Greyfriars, Shrewsbury was a friary in Shropshire, England.

Owen de la Pole (c. 1257 – c. 1293), also known as Owain ap Gruffydd ap Gwenwynwyn, the last Prince of Powys, was buried here, as was his daughter Hawise Gadarn (the Hardy), her husband John Charleton, 1st Baron Cherleton, and Owen's father Gruffydd ap Gwenwynwyn. An early 16th century sandstone range, thought to have been the refectory, survives as a house near Greyfriars Bridge.
