= Southern Powys =

Southern Powys or South Powys may refer to:

- Southern parts of the modern county of Powys
- Brecknockshire, former county, and later an area of the modern county of Powys, roughly equivalent its southern parts.
- Southern Powys (medieval), or Powys Wenwynwyn, southern lordship created after the disintegration of the Kingdom of Powys.
