= John Charlton, 3rd Baron Charlton =

English nobleman (died 1374)

John Charlton
- A stained glass window depicting John Charlton in the Church of St Mary the Virgin, Shrewsbury.
- Died: 1374
- Father: John Charlton

John Charlton (also Charleton or Cherleton), 3rd Baron Cherleton, 3rd Lord Charlton of Powys (c. 1336–1374). He was the son of John Charleton, 2nd Baron Cherleton (d. 1360) and his wife, Maud Mortimer, daughter of Roger Mortimer, 1st Earl of March. His paternal grandmother Hawys Gadarn, was heiress of the Lordship of Powys through her father the last Prince of Powys Owen de la Pole.

His marriage to Joan de Stafford, a daughter of Ralph Stafford, 1st Earl of Stafford had been arranged by his paternal grandfather John Charleton, 1st Baron Cherleton in 1343. Through this marriage he became the uncle of many prominent members of the nobility such as Thomas Stafford, 3rd Earl of Stafford, who married to Anne Plantagenet, daughter of Thomas of Woodstock, 1st Duke of Gloucester; Edmund Stafford, 5th Earl of Stafford, who became the father of Humphrey Stafford, 1st Duke of Buckingham; and Joan Stafford who married to Thomas Holland, 1st Duke of Surrey, amongst others.

He was also brother-in-law of Ralph de Stafford, who married to Countess Maud of Lancaster, daughter of Henry of Grosmont, 1st Duke of Lancaster and Isabel de Beaumont. She remarried a second time to William I, Duke of Bavaria, a son of Louis IV, Holy Roman Emperor, and member of the Royal House of Wittelsbach.

He succeeded to the title of 3rd Lord Cherleton in 1360 on the death of his father.

He is reported in the muster rolls for 1372 as being of the rank of Banneret leading 22 archers and men-at-arms on a naval expedition under the leadership of King Edward III.

He had two sons, John and Edward who later became the 4th and 5th lords Cherleton.

Peerage of England
Preceded by John Charlton	Baron Charlton; 1360–1374	Succeeded by John Charlton
