= William de la Pole (of Mawddwy) =

Sir William de la Pole (died before 1319) was the fourth son of Gruffydd ap Gwenwynwyn and would have inherited the principality of Powys Wenwynwyn, if it had continued to descend in the male line according to Welsh law, instead of having been surrendered to Edward I and regranted to his father as a marcher lordship. This descended (according to English law) to William's elder brother Owen de la Pole, and after the death of his son without issue to his daughter Hawise Gadarn, Lady of Powys, wife of John Charleton, 1st Baron Cherleton. Contrary to a few reports, there is no evidence of any relationship to William de la Pole of Hull, merchant and financier to Edward III.

Owen endowed his brothers with portions of his lordship (as his own feudal tenants), but all these reverted to Hawise, except what Sir William de la Pole had. This was the Lordship of Mawddwy, consisting of Mawddwy and most of Mallwyd. Sir William was succeeded in this lordship by his son Gruffydd (who was of age in 1319), his son, another William, and his son John. John's son Fulk predeceased his father without issue in about 1414. Accordingly, Mawddwy then passed to Fulk's sister Elizabeth, who married Hugh Burgh. Hugh Burgh's son John (1414–1471) owned the lordship, but only left four daughters who were John's coheiresses.

One of Sir John Burgh's daughters, Elisabeth (Isabella) de Burgh (died 1522) married Sir John Lingen (died 1505), buried in Aymestrey, Herefordshire, and an ancestor of the Sir Henry Lingen of Lingen, Sutton and Stoke Edith (died 1662), the family of Burton-Lingen of Longnor Hall which included 1st Baron Lingen (died 1905, buried Brompton Cemetery, London).

Another daughter, Anchoretta de Burgh, married John Leighton of StreTton, later of Wattlesborough and Loton, Sheriff of Shropshire (d 1493).
