= Charlton Castle =

Fortified manor house in England

Coordinates: 52.69697°N 2.59776°W

Charlton Castle was a fortified manor house situated in Shropshire between Shrewsbury and Telford (grid reference SJ597112).

Sir John Charlton was licensed to crenellate his dwelling at Charlton in 1316. This defended manor house was known as Charlton Castle, and was apparently still used as a residence of the Lords of Powys in the earlier part of the 16th century. In 1588 it was sold to Francis Newport but then fell into disrepair.

The site is on Historic England's Heritage at Risk Register due to being very overgrown.
