= Edward Charlton, 5th Baron Charlton =

Edward Charleton

Baron Cherleton Lord Charlton of Powys
- Tenure: 1401–1421
- Predecessor: John Charleton, 4th Baron Cherleton
- Successor: None
- Born: 1370
- Died: 14 March 1421 (aged 50–51); Castle of Pool, Poole, Powys, Wales
- Spouses: Alianore Holland, Dowager Countess of March; Elizabeth Berkeley
- Issue: Joan Grey, Countess of Tankerville; Joyce Tiptoft, Baroness Tiptoft
- Father: John Charlton, 3rd Baron Charlton
- Mother: Joan de Stafford

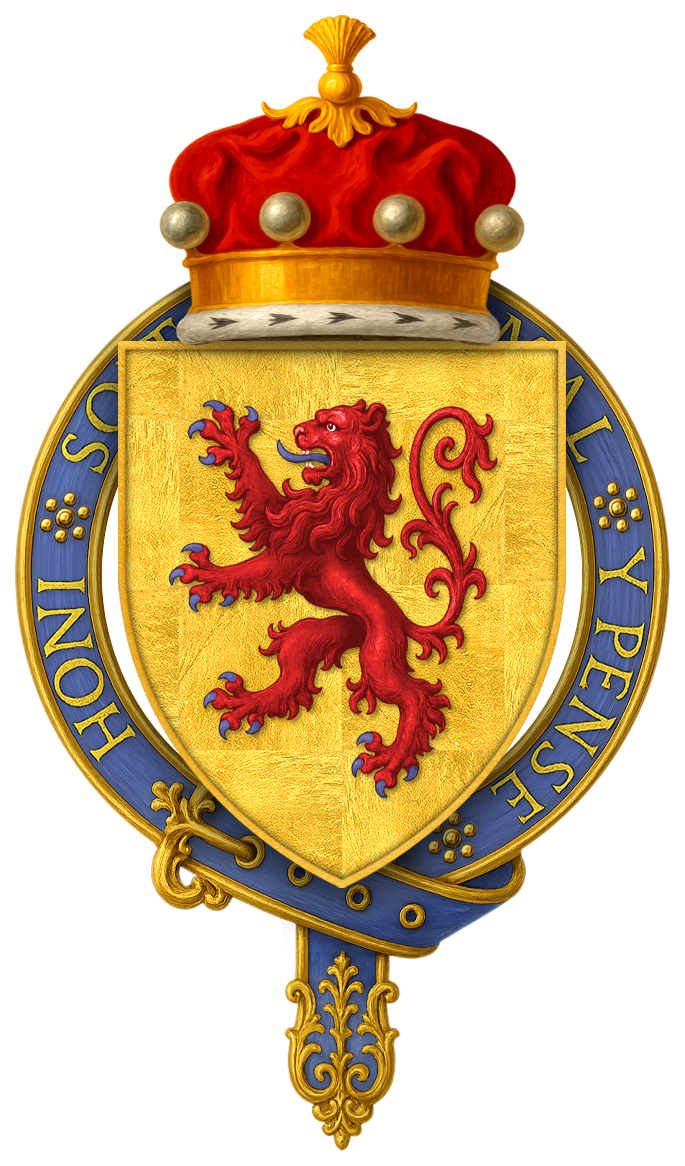
Coat of arms of Sir Edward Cherleton, 5th Baron Cherleton, KG: Or, a lion rampant gules

Edward Charlton (also Cherleton or Charleton), 5th Baron Charlton KG (1370–1421), 5th and last Lord Charlton of Powys, was the younger son of John Charlton, the third baron, and his wife, Joan, daughter of Lord Stafford.

During the lifetime of his elder brother John, the fourth lord, and very soon after her husband's death in Ireland (20 July 1398), Edward married the widowed Countess of March. Her lordships and castles of Usk and Caerleon thus fell into his hands. This brought him into relations with the chronicler Adam of Usk, who speaks of him as juvenis elegantissimus and is loud in his praises.

Charlton's relationship to the Mortimers involved him, however, in hostility to Henry of Bolingbroke, who, in July 1399, was about to proceed from Bristol to ravage his lands; but the chronicler Adam, who combined Lancastrian politics with attachment to the house of Mortimer, claims to have negotiated peace, and to have persuaded Henry to take Charlton among his followers. Charlton then accompanied Henry to Chester in his march against Richard II, and was afterwards in high favour with him. About this time Charlton showed his personal severity and the extent of the franchises of a lord marcher by condemning to death the seneschal of Usk for an intrigue with his natural sister, probable prioress of that town.

On 19 October 1401 the death of the 4th Baron Cherleton without issue involved Edward's succession to the peerage and estates of Powys. It was a critical period in the history of the Welsh marches. Owain Glyndŵr had already risen in revolt, and had ravaged the neighbourhood of Welshpool, the centre of the Charltons' power, whence he had been driven by John Charlton just before his death. Edward Charlton was possessed of inadequate resources to contend with so dangerous a neighbour, yet no border lord took a more prominent part in the Welsh war than he. In 1402 Owain overthrew his castles of Usk and Caerleon, though next year Charlton seems to have again got possession of them. In 1403 he urgently besought the council to reinforce the scanty garrisons of the border fortresses. In 1404 he was reduced to such straits that the council very unwillingly allowed him to make a private truce with the Welsh.

In 1406 his new charter to Welshpool shows in its minute and curious provisions the extreme care taken to preserve that town as a centre of English influence, and exclude the 'foreign Welsh' from its government, its courts, and even its soil. Sometime before 1408 Charlton was made a Knight of the Order of the Garter. In 1409 he procured a royal pardon for those of his vassals who had submitted to Owain, but in 1409 Owain and John, the claimant to the bishopric of St. Asaph, renewed their attack on his territories. Strict orders were sent from London that Charlton was not to leave the district, but keep all his fortresses well garrisoned against the invader. The growing preponderance of the English side may be marked in the injunction of the council not in any case to renew his old private truce with the Welsh. Finally, Charlton succeeded in maintaining himself against the waning influence of Owain.

In January 1414 Sir John Oldcastle, after his great failure, escaped to those Welsh marches, where he had first won fame as a warrior, and ultimately took refuge in the Powys estates of Charlton. There he lurked for some time until the promise of a great reward and the exhortations of the bishops to capture the common enemy of religion and society induced Charlton to take active steps for his apprehension. At last, in 1417, the heretic was tracked to a remote farm at Broniarth, and, after a severe struggle, was captured by the servants of the lord of Powys. He was first imprisoned in Powys Castle, and thence sent to London. For this service, Charlton received the special thanks of parliament. The charters are still extant in which he rewarded the brothers Ieuan and Gruffudd Vychan, sons of Gruffudd ap Ieuan, for their share in Oldcastle's capture (1419).

In 1420 Charlton conferred a new charter on the Cistercian abbey of Strata Marcella, of which his house was patron. He died on 14 March 1421.

== Marriage and issue ==
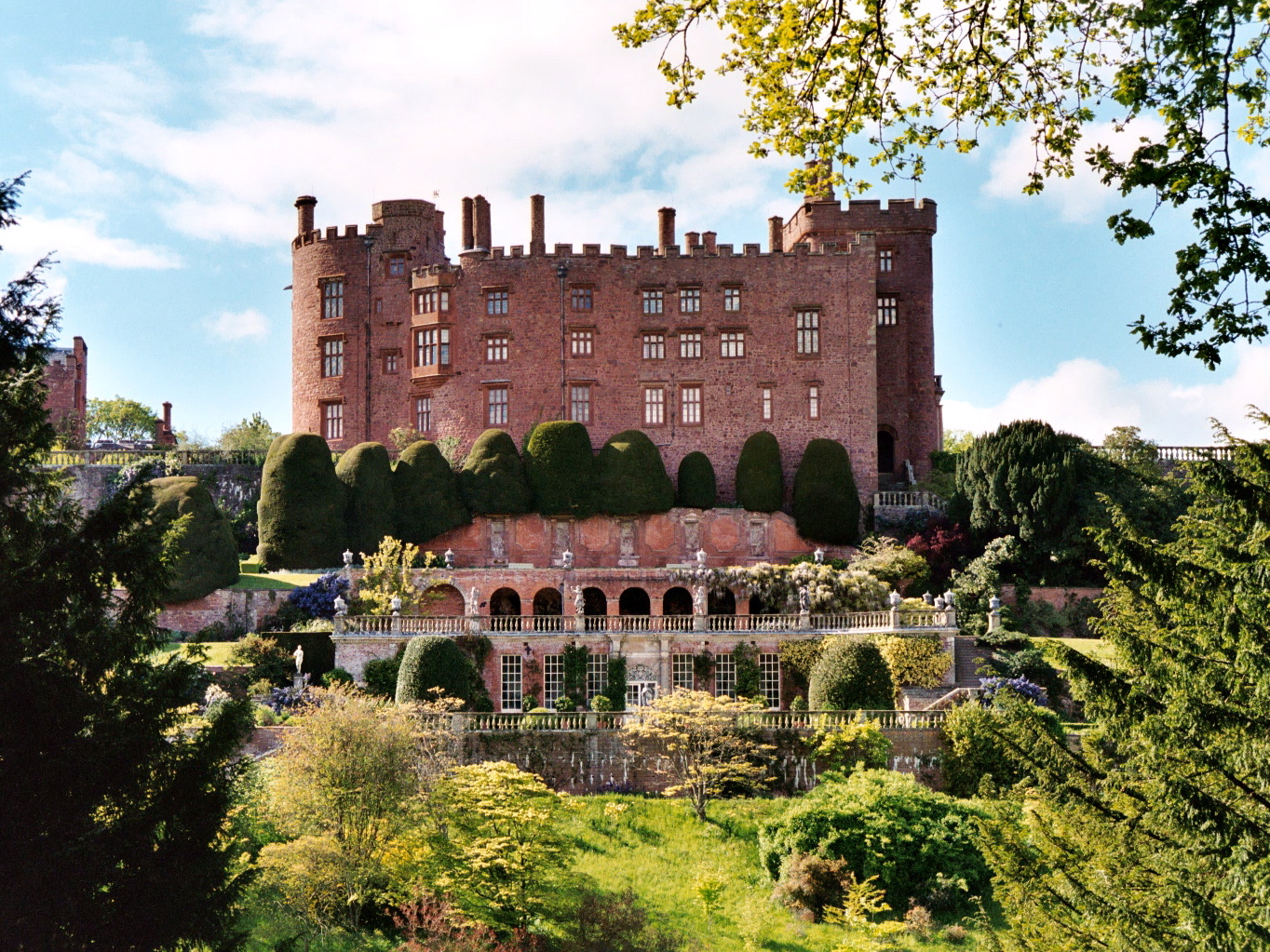
Powis Castle, Wales

Edward Charleton married twice:

- Firstly to Alianore Holland, daughter of Thomas Holland, 2nd Earl of Kent and sister and co-heiress of Edmund Holland, 4th Earl of Kent, and widow of Roger Mortimer, 4th Earl of March. He left no sons, but two daughters and co-heiresses. The estates were divided between the co-heiresses, and the peerage fell into abeyance from which it has probably never emerged, the later creation in favour of the Greys being more probably a new peerage than a revival of the old one:
  - Joan Charleton, eldest daughter, who married Sir John Grey of Heton (c. 1385–1421), Northumberland
  - Joyce Charleton, youngest daughter, who married John Tiptoft, 1st Baron Tiptoft, and had descendants both powerful marcher chieftains.
- Secondly to Elizabeth Berkeley, daughter of Sir John Berkeley of Beverstone Castle, Gloucestershire, who survived her husband and married secondly John Sutton, 1st Baron Dudley. Their son Edmund Sutton married Joyce Tiptoft, daughter of Joyce de Cherleton and Sir John Tiptoft. Grey and Dudley descendants jointly held the Cherleton inheritance, including Powis Castle, until it was allowed to pass to their kinsmen the Herbert family in 1587.

Peerage of England
Preceded by John Charlton	Baron Charlton; 1401–1421	Succeeded by none
