= John Charlton, 2nd Baron Charlton =

English nobleman (died 1360)

John Charlton
- A stained glass window depicting John Charlton in the Church of St Mary the Virgin, Shrewsbury.
- Died: 1360
- Father: John Charlton
- Mother: Hawys Gadarn

John Charlton (also Charleton or Cherleton), 2nd Baron Cherleton, 2nd Lord Charlton of Powys (died 1360) succeeded his father John Charlton, 1st Baron Charlton to the title in 1353.

His mother was Hawys Gadarn (1291 – c. 1353), daughter of Joan Corbet and Owen de la Pole, the last Prince of Powys, making her the heiress to the former Welsh kingdom of Powys Wenwynwyn in Wales. His parents were married after his mother Hawys sought the intervention of Edward II of England at the Parliament of Shrewsbury to support her inheritance against the intentions of four of her uncles, led by Gruffydd ap Gruffydd, to take her lands following the death of her brother Gruffydd in 1309. John had a brother Owen, who died without children.

Sometimes known as John de Charlton junior to distinguish him from his long lived father, he fought in the Wars of Gascony in the Hundred Years' War and held the office of Lord Chamberlain of the Household as his father had before him.

He married Maud Mortimer (c. 1307 – after August 1345), daughter of Roger Mortimer, 1st Earl of March and Joan de Geneville, Baroness Geneville (1286–1356), before 13 April 1319. They had one son John Charleton, 3rd Baron Cherleton (c. 1336–1374) who succeeded to the title on his father's death.

John Charlton died before 30 August 1360.

Peerage of England
Preceded by John Charlton	Baron Charlton; 1353–1360	Succeeded by John Charlton
