= Powis Castle =

Grade I listed castle in Powys, Wales

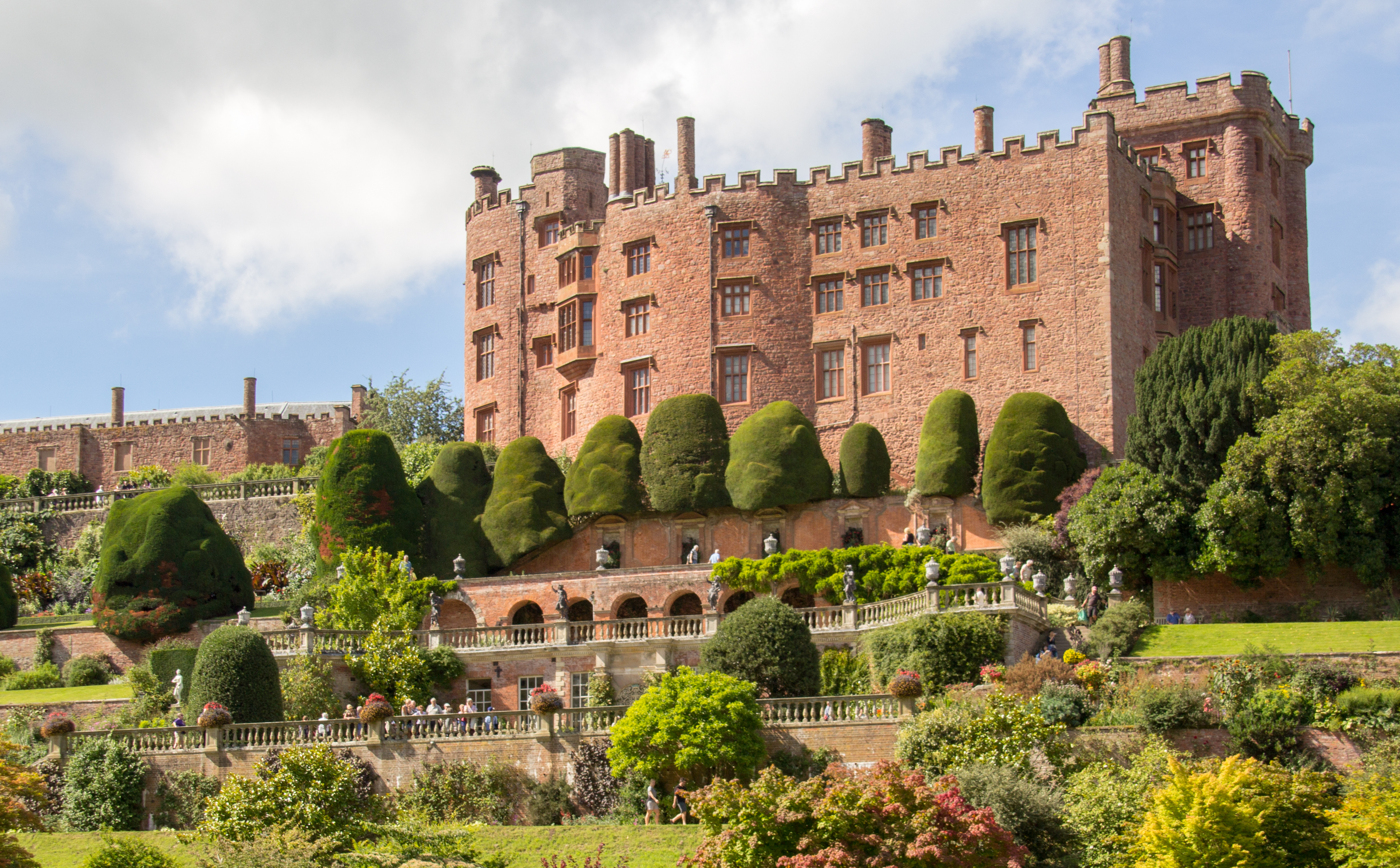
- Powis Castle from the south, showing the distinctive terraced gardens

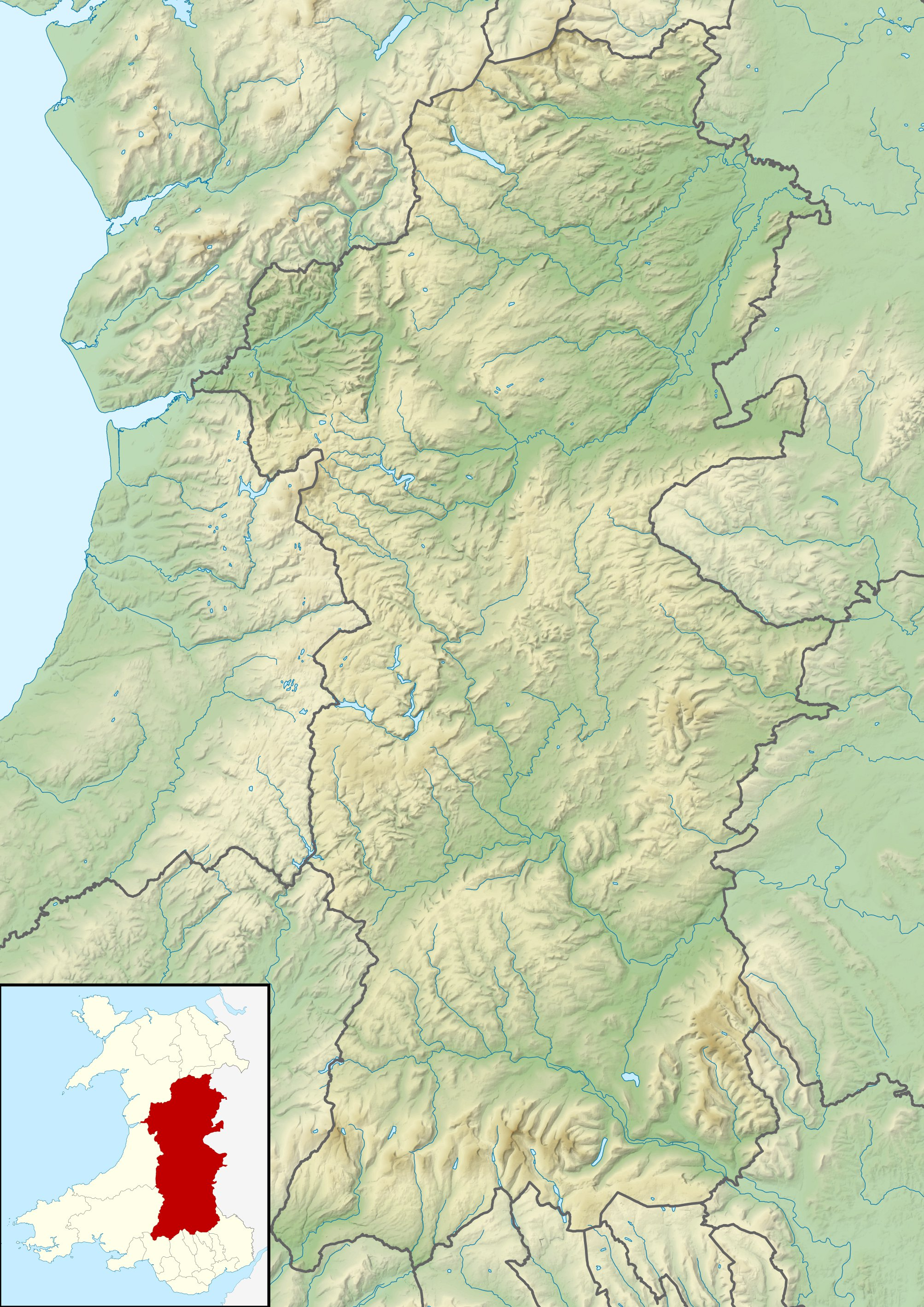
- Location within Powys
- 52°39′00″N 03°09′38″W
- Type: Castle
- Location: Welshpool, Powys, Wales

Site notes
- Architect(s): William Winde, Robert Smirke, George Frederick Bodley
- Owner: National Trust
- Website: Official website

Cadw/ICOMOS Register of Parks and Gardens of Special Historic Interest in Wales
- Official name: Powis Castle
- Designated: 1 February 2022; 4 years ago
- Reference no.: PGW(Po)35(POW)
- Listing: Grade I

Listed Building – Grade I
- Official name: Powis Castle
- Designated: 25 April 1950
- Reference no.: 7746

Listed Building – Grade I
- Official name: Aviary Terrace in Powis Castle Gardens
- Designated: 11 March 1981
- Reference no.: 16775

Listed Building – Grade I
- Official name: Orangery Terrace in Gardens at Powis Castle
- Designated: 11 March 1981
- Reference no.: 16776

Listed Building – Grade I
- Official name: Apple Slope Terrace in Gardens at Powis Castle
- Designated: 11 March 1981
- Reference no.: 16777

Powis Castle (Welsh: Castell Powys) is a medieval castle, fortress and grand country house near Welshpool, in Powys, Wales. The seat of the Herbert family, earls of Powis, the castle is known for its formal gardens and for its interiors, the former having been described as "the most important", and the latter "the most magnificent", in the country. The castle and gardens are under the care of the National Trust. Powis Castle is a Grade I listed building, while its gardens have their own Grade I listing on the Cadw/ICOMOS Register of Parks and Gardens of Special Historic Interest in Wales.

The present castle was built in the 13th century. Unusually for a castle on the Marches, it was constructed by a Welsh prince, Gruffydd ap Gwenwynwyn, rather than by a Norman baron. Gruffydd was prince of the ancient Kingdom of Powys and maintained an alliance with the English king Edward I during the struggles of the later 13th century. He was able to secure the position of his son, Owain, although the kingdom itself was abolished by the Parliament of Shrewsbury in 1283. After his father's death, Owain was raised to the peerage as Owen de la Pole, 1st Lord of Powis. Following his own death c. 1293, and the death of his only son, he was succeeded by his daughter, Hawys Gadarn, "the Lady of Powis". Hawys married Sir John Charlton in 1309.

In the late 16th century the castle was purchased by Sir Edward Herbert, a younger son of William Herbert, 1st earl of Pembroke, beginning a connection between the family and the castle that continues today. The Herberts remained Roman Catholic until the 18th century and, although rising in the peerage to earls, marquesses and Jacobite dukes of Powis, suffered periods of imprisonment and exile. Despite these setbacks, they were able in the late 17th and early 18th centuries to transform Powis from a border fortress into an aristocratic country house, and surround it with one of the very few extant examples of a British Baroque garden.

In 1784 Henrietta Herbert married Edward Clive, eldest son of Clive of India, a match which replenished the much-depleted Herbert family fortune. In the early 20th century, George Herbert, 4th Earl of Powis, redeveloped the castle with the assistance of the architect George Frederick Bodley. Herbert’s wife, Violet, undertook work of equal importance in the garden, seeking to turn it into "one of the most beautiful, if not the most beautiful, in England and Wales". On the 4th Earl's death in 1952, his wife and his sons having predeceased him, the castle passed into the care of the National Trust.

== History ==
=== First castles at Welshpool: 1111–1286 ===
Unlike the castles at Conwy, Caernarfon, Harlech and nearby Montgomery, which were built by the English to subdue the Welsh, the castles at Welshpool were built by the Welsh princes of Powys Wenwynwyn as their dynastic seat. In addition to the current site, two motte-and-bailey castles and a set of earthworks are located nearby. The names Trallwg/Tallwm and Pola are used interchangeably in early primary sources, and it is unclear which of these sites is being referred to.

The earliest reference dates from 1111, when Cadwgan ap Bleddyn is mentioned as having planned to construct a castle at Trallwng Llywelyn, the oldest record of a native Welsh castle. Domen Castell, a motte-and-bailey near the modern railway station, is considered the most likely site of Cadwgan's castle, although it is uncertain whether it was completed as he was assassinated the same year. The first documentary account of an extant castle at Welshpool is a description of the successful 1196 siege by an English army, although the castle was retaken by the Welsh within the year.

The earliest castle at the current site may have been a timber building constructed by Owain Cyfeiliog or his son, Gwenwynwyn (r. 1197–1216). The present masonry structure contains 13th-century fabric, most likely the work of Gruffydd ap Gwenwynwyn (r. 1241–1287) – although historians are uncertain when this took place. (Note: The historian David Stephenson has suggested that the castle could have been started in the period 1241–1257, although if this was the case "the first structure almost certainly suffered near total destruction in 1274".) In 1274, Gruffydd's "first castle" at Welshpool was destroyed by Llywelyn ap Gruffudd as punishment for his involvement in a scheme to assassinate Llywelyn. (Note: The castle is recorded is having been "burnt down" by Llywelyn, implying the presence of a timber structure, but Gruffydd subsequently demanded compensation worth £1000 – a large sum indicating his castle may have included a substantial masonry structure.) The castle was documented again in 1286, when it was listed amongst Gruffydd's possessions as "la Pole Castr". A detailed examination of Powis Castle's extant masonry carried out between 1987 and 1989 revealed early stonework incorporated into the later structure, putatively the remains of an early stone shell keep. At the end of Edward I's conquest of Wales in 1282–83, the king permitted Gruffydd to rebuild his castle at Welshpool as a reward for his loyalty.

=== Early history: 1286–1644 ===
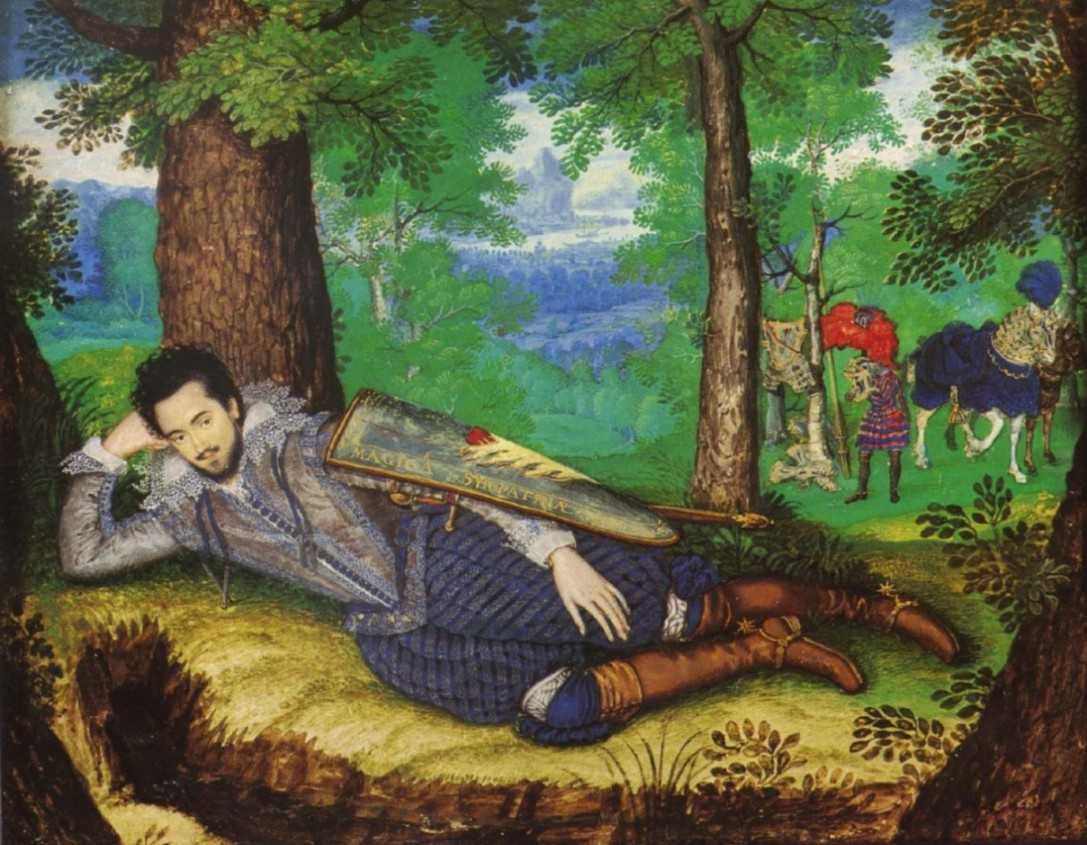
Edward Herbert, 1st Baron Herbert of Cherbury (Note: The portrait of Sir Edward Herbert of Cherbury came to the castle when a Cherbury Herbert married into the family of their cousins, the Powis Herberts, in the 18th century.)

In 1286, four years after the conquest of Wales, Gruffydd's son, Owain ap Gruffydd ap Gwenwynwyn became the last hereditary prince of Powys when he renounced his royal title, and was granted the barony of de la Pole, (i.e. "of the Pool", a reference to Welshpool, formerly called just "Pool"). (Note: The unusual spelling of Powis, with an 'i' instead of a 'y' as in the county spelling, derives from the Herbert family's title as Lord, and later Earl of Powis. Powis is a shortened version of the Latinised spelling of the Welsh Powys.) The ancient Kingdom of Powys had once included the counties of Montgomeryshire, much of Denbighshire, parts of Radnorshire and large areas of Shropshire, but by the 13th century had been reduced to two independent principalities – Powys Wenwynwyn and Powys Fadog – roughly equivalent to Montgomeryshire and South Denbighshire (plus Maelor Saesneg), respectively; Welshpool had become the capital of Powys Wenwynwyn, of which Owain had been heir. On the death of Owain, the castle passed to his daughter Hawys, who married Sir John Charlton. The Charltons continued to live at Powis until the fifteenth century when two daughters, Joyce Tiptoft and Joan Grey inherited the castle and estates. Both were equally divided, each daughter and her husband living in a portion of the castle.

In 1578 an illegitimate son of the last Baron Grey of Powis, began leasing the lordship and castle to a distant relative – Sir Edward Herbert (d. 1595), second son of Sir William Herbert, 1st Earl of Pembroke. Edward eventually bought the castle outright in 1587, beginning the connection between the Herberts and Powis Castle which continues today. Sir Edward's wife was a Roman Catholic and the family's allegiance to Rome and to the Stuart kings was to shape its destiny for over a century. Sir Edward began the transformation of Powis from a border fortress into an Elizabethan country house. The major remaining element of his work is the Long Gallery.

Herbert's descendent William Herbert, 1st Baron Powis (c. 1573–1655), was a supporter of Charles I, and was granted the barony of Powis in 1629. His loyalty during the English Civil War cost him his castle and his estates. On 22 October 1644 Powis Castle was captured by Parliamentary troops and was not returned to the family until the restoration of Charles II in 1660.

=== The Herberts: 1660–1800 ===
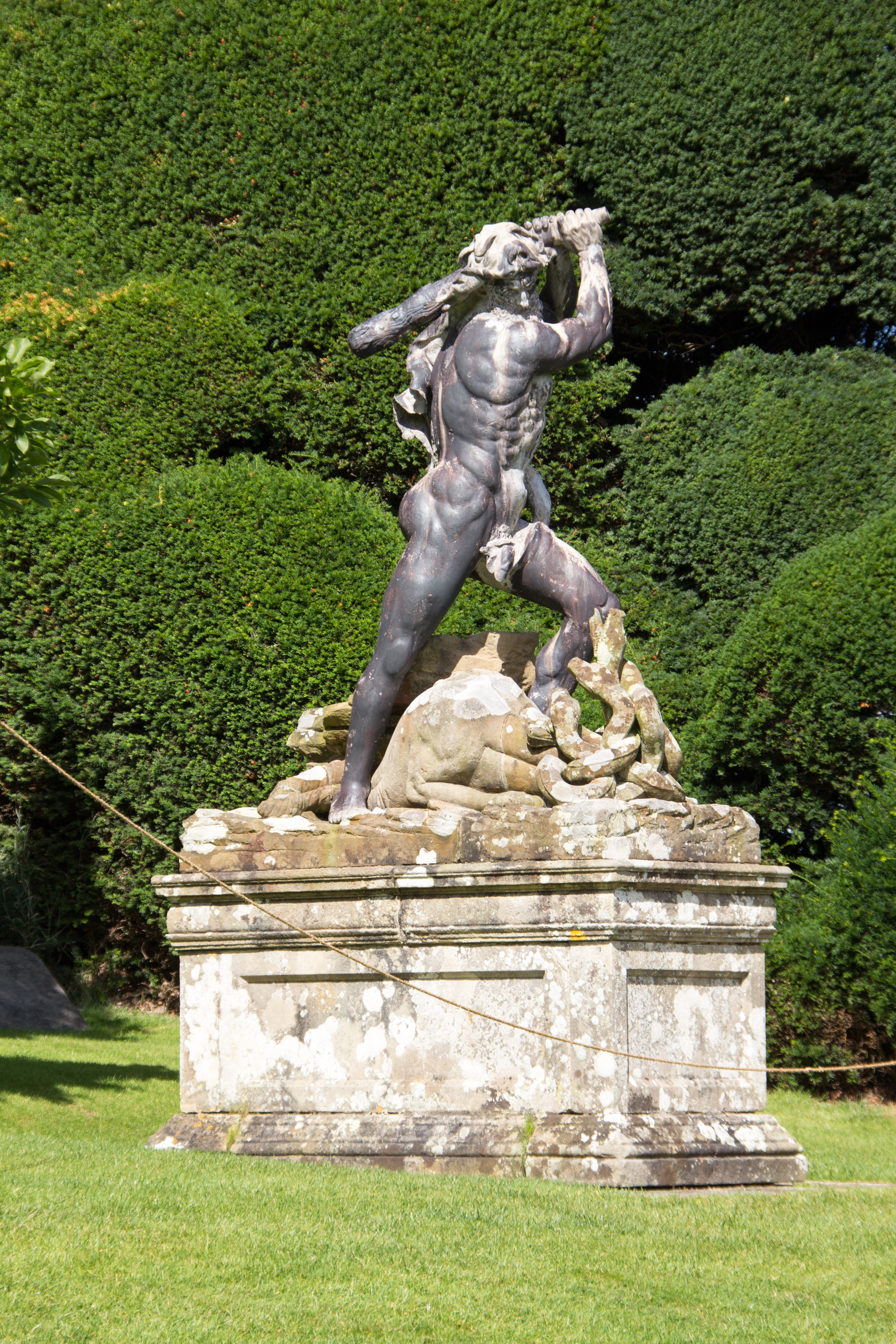
The Hercules statue which stood originally in the Water Garden

On the restoration, the Herberts returned to Powis, and in 1674 William Herbert (c. 1626–1696) was created Earl of Powis (of the first creation). The state bedroom was installed in about 1665 and further improvements, including the construction of the Great Staircase followed in the 1670s. These developments were most probably carried out under the direction of William Winde, who may also have designed the terraced gardens. His employer, although restored to his estates, and raised in the peerage, was barred by his Catholic faith from high office under Charles II. On the accession of the King's brother, James in 1685, Herbert became one of the new king's chief ministers, and was again advanced in the peerage becoming Marquess of Powis in 1687, but fell at the Glorious Revolution of 1688 and followed James into exile in France. (Note: Although deprived of his estates, Herbert gained in aristocratic precedence. James elevated him to the rank of Marquess in 1687, and made him Duke of Powis in 1689. Although Herbert used the latter title, it was unrecognised outside of the Jacobite Peerage.) William III granted the castle to his nephew, William Nassau de Zuylestein, 1st Earl of Rochford. Herbert died, still in exile, in 1696.

Despite their 30-year exile, the Herberts were able to continue with developments at the castle and even to live there on an irregular basis, the Baroque water garden below the castle being completed at this time. Their fortunes were also materially improved by the discovery of a lucrative lead mine on their Welsh estates. The second Marquess, also William, was reinstated in 1722. On the death of his son, the third Marquess in 1748, the marquessate became extinct, while the castle and estates passed to a relative, Henry Herbert (c. 1703–1772), of Oakly Park in Shropshire, who was made 1st Earl of Powis (of the second creation) by George II. Herbert married Barbara, the fifteen-year-old granddaughter of the 2nd Marquess, in 1751. Their eldest son, George Herbert, 2nd Earl of Powis (1755–1801), died unmarried and the earldom of the second creation became extinct. (Note: George Herbert spent extravagantly and was not well-regarded by his contemporaries. John Byng described him as "a mean silly man, the bubble of his mistress and his steward, who rarely comes [to Powis] to sneak about for a day or two".) Powis was much neglected during his tenure. John Byng, 5th Viscount Torrington, a diarist and traveller who chronicled his journeys into Wales in the 1780s and 1790s, described the castle in 1784, "In the gardens not even the fruit is attended to; the balustrades and terraces are falling down, and the horses graze on the parterres!!!" The castle itself was in no better condition, a visitor in 1774 describing it as "in Neglect and Ruin". Nonetheless, the potential of the site was recognised. George Lyttelton, the politician, poet and essayist, recorded his impressions in 1756, "About £3,000 laid out upon Powis Castle would make it the most august place in the Kingdom."

=== The Clives and Herberts: 1801–1952 ===
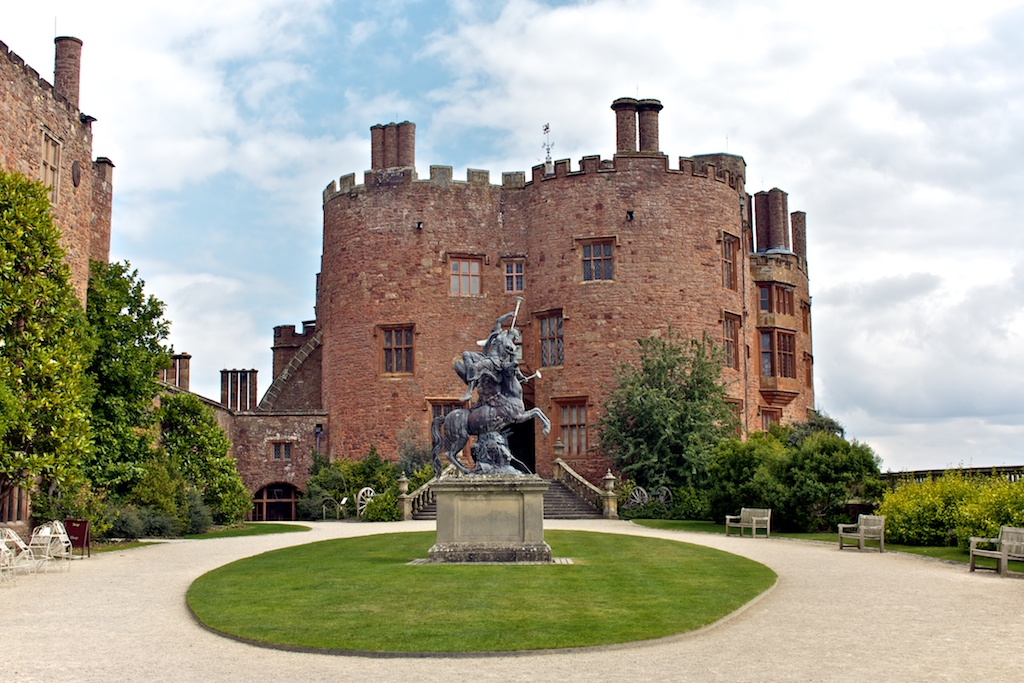
The Outer Courtyard with the Fame statue in the foreground

In 1784, Henry Herbert's daughter, Henrietta, married Edward Clive (1754–1839), the eldest son of Clive of India. Clive had followed his father to India, and served as Governor of Madras. Henrietta's brother died in 1801, whereupon the title lapsed; in 1804, her husband was created first Earl of Powis (of the third creation). The Clive fortune paid for long overdue repairs to the castle, which were carried out by Sir Robert Smirke. Their son, Edward (1785–1848), inherited his late uncle's Powis estates on his 21st birthday, taking the surname Herbert in compliance with his uncle's will. Edward Herbert served in a range of administrations as an Anti-Catholic Tory, his speeches in the House of Commons being "cautious and pertinent, although marred by dull delivery". He died in 1848, following a shooting accident at Powis in which he was fatally injured by his second son. No further major changes were made to the Powis estate during his time, or in the long tenure of his eldest son Edward Herbert, 3rd Earl of Powis (1818–1891), although the castle was well maintained. In honour of his great-grandfather, the earl was offered the viceroyalty of India by Benjamin Disraeli but declined, writing "Not worth considering. Powis" on the envelope containing the invitation.

The final alterations to Powis Castle were undertaken at the beginning of the 20th century by George Frederick Bodley for George Charles Herbert, 4th Earl of Powis (1862–1952). The rooms designed by Bodley remain his only extant decorative scheme; the longevity of the 4th Earl, the deaths of his heirs, and his bequest of the castle to the National Trust saw the early 20th-century remodelling remain largely unaltered. (Note: The connection between the 4th Earl and Bodley may have been occasioned through the Earl's cousin, Robert Windsor-Clive, 1st Earl of Plymouth, whose Worcestershire home, Hewell Grange was also designed by the partnership of Bodley & Garner, although there Thomas Garner took the leading role.) The 4th earl's wife, Violet (nee Lane-Fox), undertook the final transformation of the gardens of Powis Castle, which she felt had the potential to be "the most beautiful in England and Wales". The Countess died following a car accident in 1929, and Lord Powis outlived both his sons, who died on active service, Percy from wounds received at the Battle of the Somme in 1916, and Mervyn in a plane crash in 1943. On his own death in 1952, he bequeathed the castle and gardens to the National Trust. (Note: The family retained the wider estate, which comprises some 14,000 acres in Powys and Shropshire. They also retained ownership of some of the contents, many of those of South Asian origin being disposed of in a sale in 2002.)

=== The National Trust: 1952–present ===
The 4th earl was succeeded by his cousin, Edward Herbert, 5th Earl of Powis (1889–1974). Edward's heir was Christian Herbert, 6th Earl of Powis (1904–1988). He was succeeded by his cousin, George Herbert, 7th Earl of Powis (1925–1993), who was in turn succeeded by his son, John, the 8th and current Earl. The Herbert family continue to live in part of the castle, under an arrangement with the National Trust. The Trust has undertaken a number of major works of restoration during its ownership, including the Marquess Gate, the Grand Staircase, and the sculpture of Fame in the Outer Courtyard. (Note: The statue of Fame, depicting the muse blowing a trumpet while astride a horse, has had an unfortunate history since its removal from the water garden. In the early 19th century it was sited above the main gate, before being moved to a flowerbed in the Outer Courtyard. In the early 20th century, Bodley attempted to restore it as a fountain but the result failed to please the countess. "The horse looked as if it was trying to jump out of a footbath. The jet of water through the trumpet was not strong enough. Altogether it was not a success." By the 1990s, the whole statue was close to collapse, because of the decay of its inner supporting structure, and the Trust was required to undertake a wholescale renovation.) The castle and its gardens receive around 200,000 visitors annually.

== Architecture and description ==
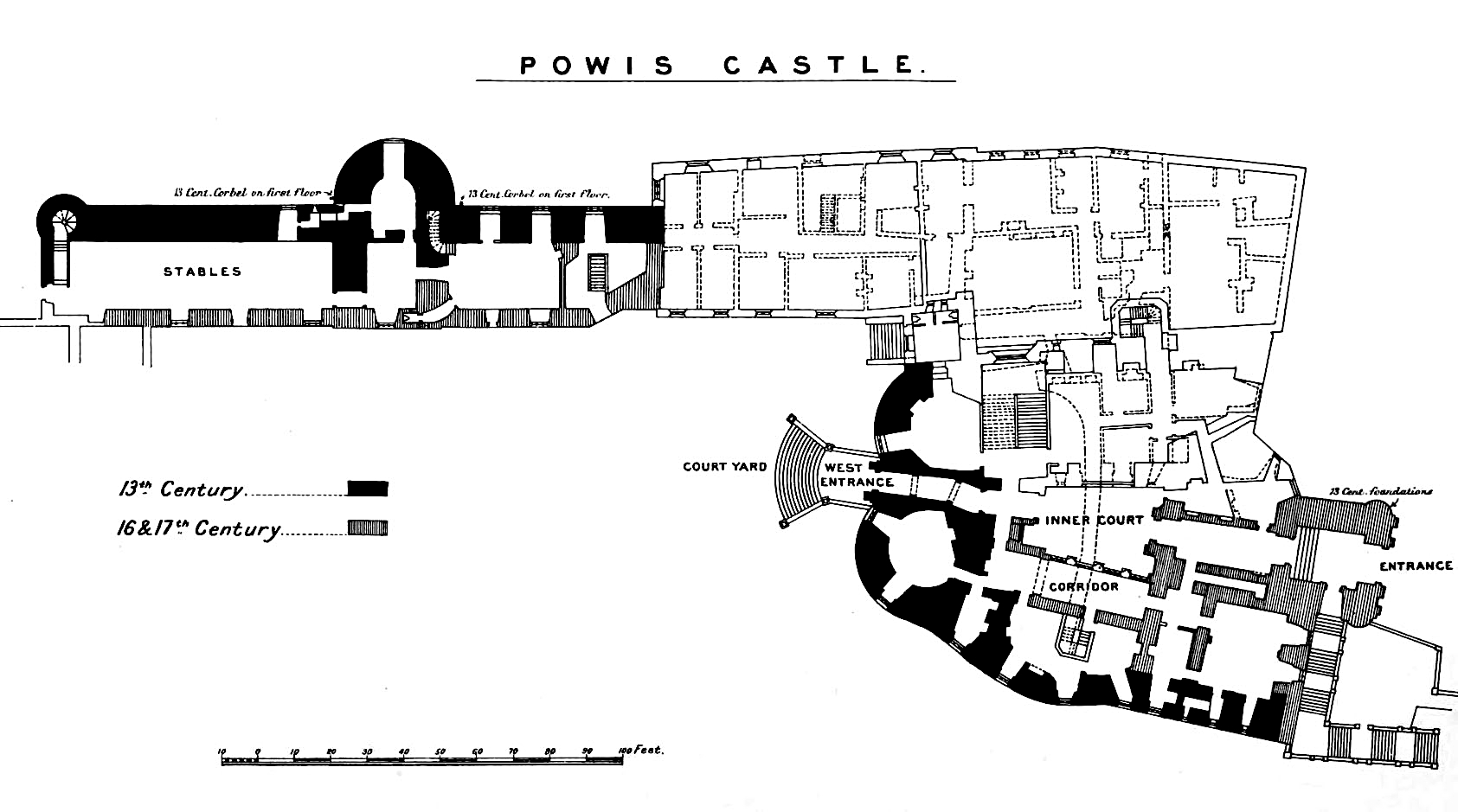
Ground plan of the castle

=== Exterior ===
Entrance to the castle is made through an outer gatehouse, with the stables to the right and a coach house to the left. The medieval building history is complex; John R. Kenyon, in his study The Medieval Castles of Wales, notes that "the accretion of later buildings and much modification, have made it notoriously difficult to interpret the early phasing." Continuing the run of buildings on the left is the North Range, with former domestic offices below and a ballroom above. The base of this block formed the outer bailey wall of the original castle.

The first floor of this range also contains the Clive Museum, which features artefacts brought from India by the Clives in the 18th century. The outer courtyard contains the lead statue of Fame, attributed to the workshop of John Nost (d. 1729). Originally located in the water gardens, the piece seems to have been struck from the same mould as the Pegasus and Fame supplied by van Nost between 1705 and 1716 to Sir Nicholas Shireburn at Stonyhurst, Lancashire. A grand staircase leads to the doorway to the main keep, sandwiched between two drum towers. The keep is entered at the other end through the Marquess Gate, a sequence of iron gates, followed by a flight of steps leading up to a Baroque doorcase. Their date of construction is uncertain; they may be from the time of the 1st Marquess in the late 17th century, or from the time of the 2nd Marquess in the early 18th century. Both entrances lead into the small Inner Courtyard. Originally with an open arcade, this was enclosed by Smirke in the 1820s. The keep contains the main living apartments of the Herberts, while the continuance of the North Range houses the kitchen and servants' quarters.

=== Interiors ===
Scourfield and Haslam, in their Powys volume of Pevsner's The Buildings of Wales, describe the castle interiors as "the most magnificent in Wales". They contain murals and ceiling paintings by Antonio Verrio and Gerard Lanscroon; a collection of Elizabethan and Jacobean family portraits mainly of members of the Herberts of Chirbury, who inherited the castle in the early 18th century; Carolean furnishings of notable richness and quality; and items from the picture and Indian collections of Robert Clive. The early 20th-century redevelopment and redecoration undertaken by George Bodley was sensitively handled, Scourfield and Haslam consider it "appropriate and finely executed", and it is the only remaining, unaltered, example of his decorative approach. (Note: Bodley's contemporaneous remodelling at St Donat's Castle, undertaken with Thomas Garner, was almost completely obliterated in the "brutal" remodelling undertaken by William Randolph Hearst in the 1920s.) The work took from 1902 until Bodley's death in 1907 and cost around £30,000.

==== Great Staircase ====
The great staircase was built c. 1673-85, probably under the direction of William Winde. The ceiling painting is by Verrio, and likely depicts Catherine of Braganza, wife of Charles II. Charles restored William Herbert to his Welsh estates and made him 1st Earl of Powis (of the first creation) in 1674. The painting's inspiration is the Apotheosis of Venice in the Doge's Palace, by Paolo Veronese. The staircase has been closed to visitors to the castle for many years, because of structural instability. In 2017 the Trust began fundraising efforts for restoration. A structural survey, undertaken in 2020, investigated whether the staircase vibrations, caused by visitor footfall, were the cause of damage to the wall and ceiling paintings. The report's authors concluded that there was not a direct link, but emphasised the challenge of balancing the needs of visitors with the requirement to maintain historic fabrics.

==== State Dining Room ====
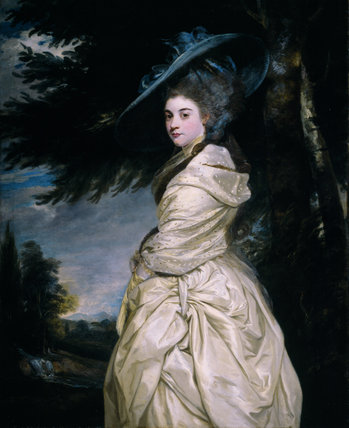
Henrietta Clive, Countess of Powis whose marriage re-established the family fortune

The dining room was created by Bodley by the re-amalgamation of two smaller rooms. The 4th Earl took a very close interest in Bodley's work, and influenced much of the decoration. The chimneypieces in the room were copied from examples in the Victoria and Albert Museum, and the ceiling from the Reindeer Inn, a public house in Banbury, both at the Earl's suggestion. (Note: The Earl particularly disliked Robert Smirke's neoclassical redecoration, "I decided to remove some of the late 18th and early 19th century alterations which I thought incongruous and not in keeping with the castle." He was also conscious of the impact on the castle's fabric of many years of neglect. A guest, on being shown her gloomy bedroom at the castle, had congratulated his wife on the ingenious conversion of the dungeons.) The room contains a portrait of Henrietta Clive, Countess of Powis (1758–1830), painted in 1777 by Sir Joshua Reynolds. The Countess was daughter of Henry Herbert, 1st Earl of Powis and wife of Edward Clive, 1st Earl of Powis. The hat and the lace scarf which she wears in the portrait are not shown in an engraving of the same subject dating to 1778 and appear to have been added later.

==== State Bedroom ====
A remarkable survival of the 1660s, the State Bedroom is the only remaining one in Britain where a balustrade separates the bed alcove from the rest of the room. The design demonstrates the desire of the Anglo-Welsh aristocracy to emulate the etiquette that regulated the court of Louis XIV at Versailles. The room is attributed to William Winde, at the time of his work on the gardens. When improvements to the castle were being considered in 1772, the architect Thomas Farnolls Pritchard recommended that the bedroom be preserved. The bed itself dates from this period of reconstruction. The room was designed to receive Charles II, and is much decorated with the initials CR. (Note: Although Charles II never stayed at Powis, the current king Charles III was a frequent visitor to the castle during the time of the 6th Earl.) The window latches in the shape of the Prince of Wales's feathers commemorate the visit of the future King Edward VII. His son and daughter-in-law (later King George V and Queen Mary), visited in 1909.

==== Long Gallery ====
The Long Gallery was built by Sir Edward Herbert, following his purchase of the castle in 1587. It is constructed to a T-plan, an unusual design for an Elizabethan long gallery. Displayed in the gallery is a marble group of a cat and snake. It is probably Roman, dating between the 1st century BC and 2nd century AD, although it could be an 18th-century fake. Representations of cats are rare in Roman art. The marble, quarried on Thasos was probably purchased by Clive of India for his wife on his visit to Italy in 1774. The gallery also contains a set of busts of the Roman Caesars. Their great weight led to their being moved from the Long Gallery by the Trust, because of concerns that they would lead the floor to collapse, but a full reconstruction of the floor has enabled them to be returned.

==== Clive Museum ====
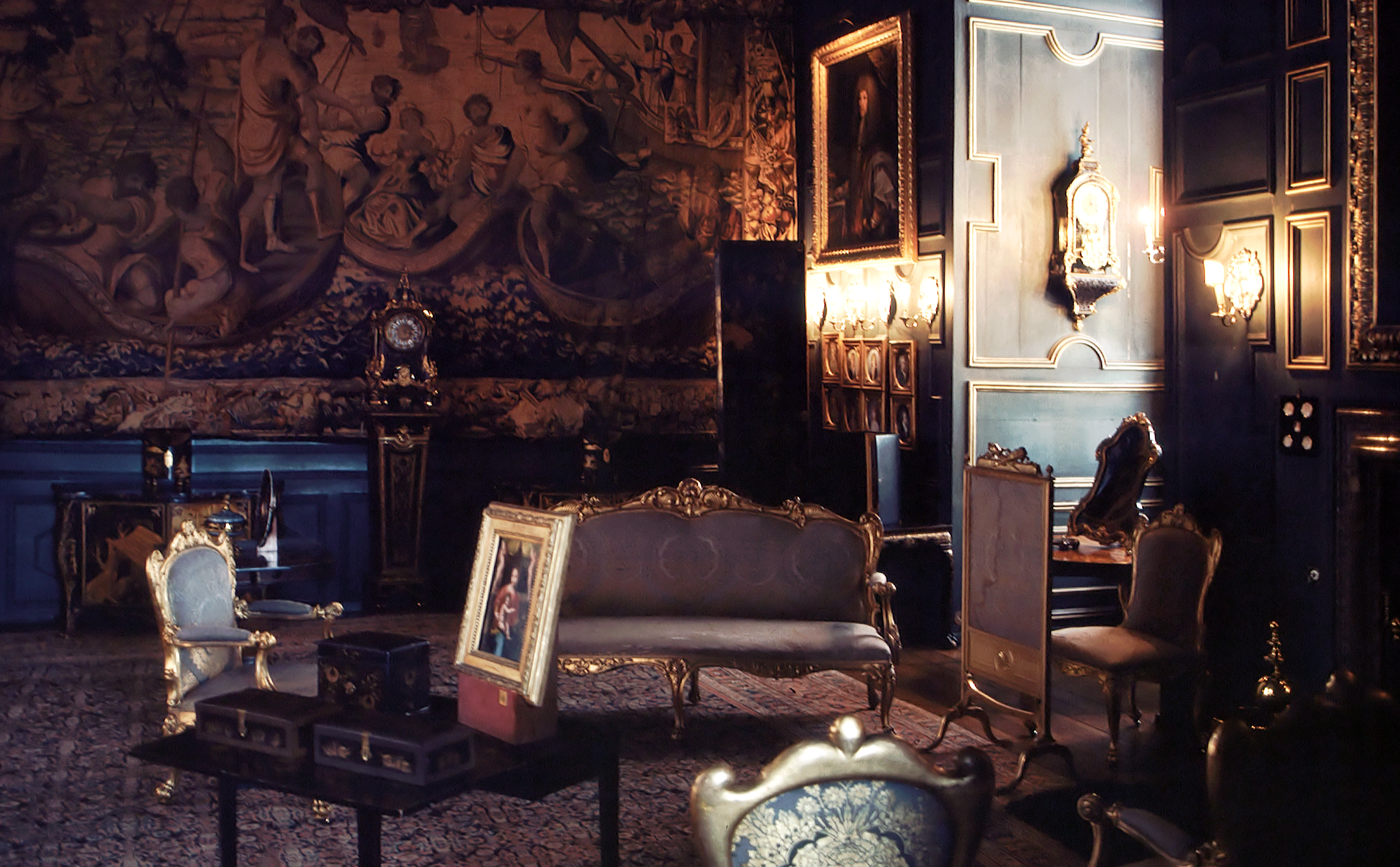
An interior view

When Robert Clive returned to England, his fortune of some £234,000 (£23 million today), made him the richest self-made man in Europe. According to William Dalrymple, much of the wealth amassed by Clive was loot that was illicitly collected after the Battle of Plassey. Several of Clive's acquisitions are on display in the Clive Museum at Powis Castle, along with items acquired subsequently by Edward and Henrietta, during Edward's time working firstly for the East India Company and then as the Governor of Madras. (Note: After the siege which ended the Fourth Anglo-Mysore War in 1799, Henrietta wrote to her brother; "The plunder of Seringapatam is immense. The riches are quite extraordinary. I should like to have the pickings of some of the boxes.") These include Tipu Sultan's magnificent state tent, made of painted chintz; gold and bejewelled tiger's head finials from Tipu's throne; two cannons that are today positioned on either side of the castle entrance, and textiles, armour, weapons, bronzes, silver pieces, and collections of jade and ivory.

The Clive Museum, opened in 1987 next to the ballroom in the North Range, has been the focus of controversy in the 21st century, because of the raised awareness of the links between country house collections and colonialism, as a result of the Black Lives Matter movement. The National Trust has committed to supporting reinterpretation of the South Asian collection. (Note: The Powis South Asia collection has featured in the 21st-century culture wars. The Trust’s efforts to better understand and explain the collection have drawn both praise and criticism.) In 2020, the National Trust commissioned a post-doctoral research project with the Ashmolean Museum and a PhD studentship with the University of Cambridge to research its history, curation, contents and provenance.

=== Listing designations ===
In Wales Cadw is the statutory body with responsibility for the listing of buildings. Cadw uses the same rating system as Historic England, classifying listed buildings into three categories; Grade I, the highest grade, for buildings of "exceptional interest", Grade II*, the next grade, for buildings of "more than special interest", and Grade II, the lowest grade, for buildings of "special interest". Powis Castle is a Grade I listed building. The Outer Gatehouse, the Marquess Gate, the Ballroom Range to the north of the Outer Courtyard and the retaining wall to the south, as well as the Top, Aviary, and Orangery Terraces all have separate Grade I listings. The statues of Fame, and of Hercules are listed Grade II*. The raised terrace to the south-east, the stone vase on the site of the water garden cascade, and the Peacock statue have Grade II designations as do a number of domestic offices, including the Ice House, the Bothy, the Garden House, four cottages, and a range of garden features.

== Gardens ==
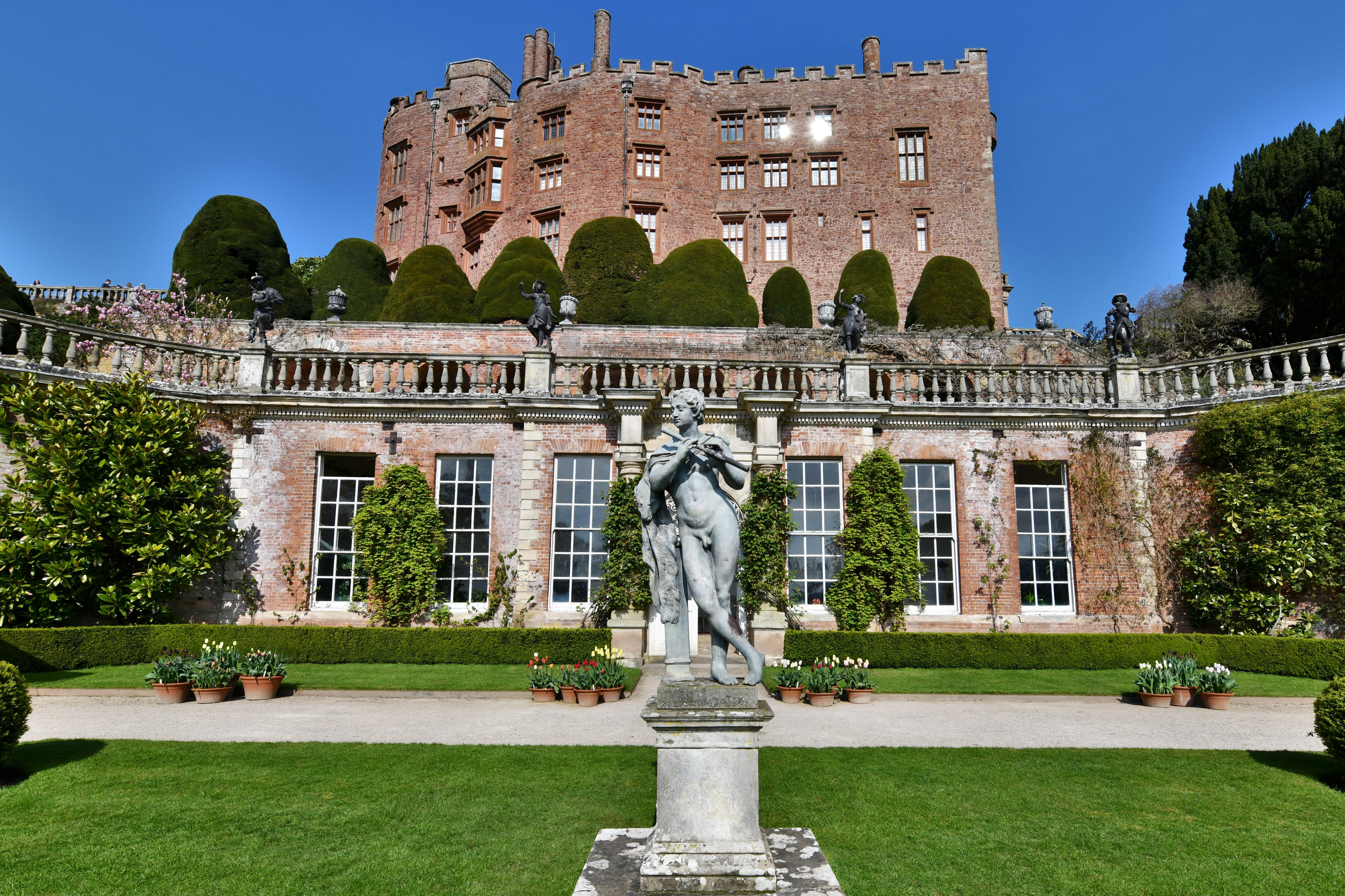
The Orangery Terrace

Elisabeth Whittle, the garden historian, considers the gardens at Powis to be "the most important and magnificent [.] in Wales". They mainly survived the 18th-century reaction against the formality of earlier garden design, and are one of the few remaining Baroque gardens in the UK. Although their exact dating is uncertain, the terraces were hewn from the rock at some point between the 1670s and 1705 under the direction of William Winde and later Adrian Duvall, a French gardener from Rouen.

The concept of formal terraces was introduced into northern Europe from the gardens of 16th-century Italy. The gardens originally comprised six terraces, descending from the castle, and culminating in a water garden. Winde had earlier worked on a similar terraced layout at Cliveden in Buckinghamshire, a design of which his patron was almost certainly aware. The castle gardens are listed Grade I on the Cadw/ICOMOS Register of Parks and Gardens of Special Historic Interest in Wales, their listing record describing them as the finest remaining Baroque gardens in Britain.

=== The Water Garden ===
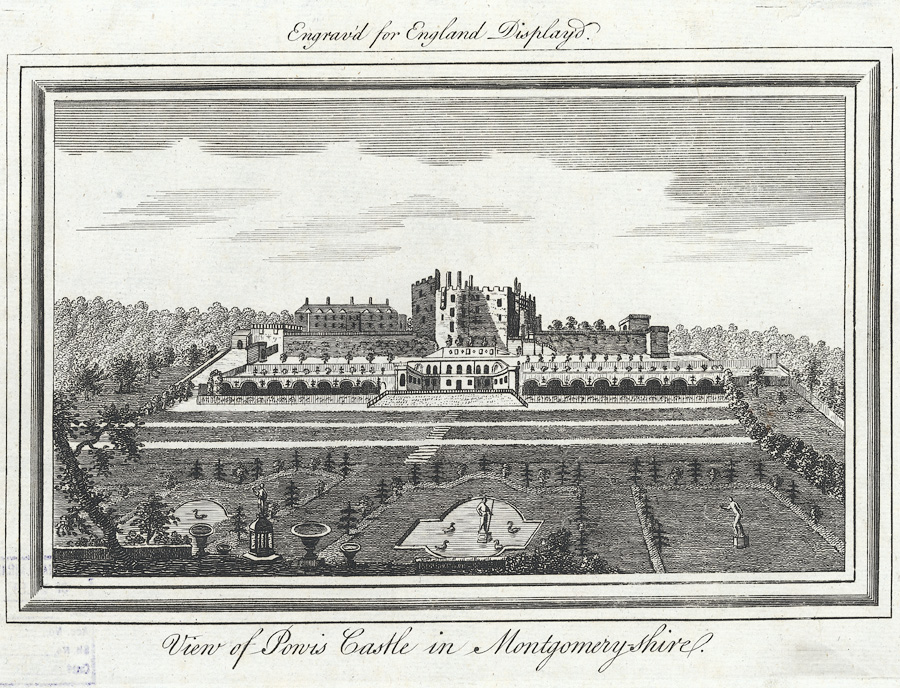
A late 18th-century view showing the terraces and water garden

Duvall may have had training in hydraulics, being responsible for the original water gardens, which were laid out in a Dutch style. Their design was almost certainly influenced by the gardens of the Château de Saint-Germain-en-Laye, outside Paris. The château was home to James II after his flight from England and was thus well known to the Marquess of Powis and his son. Its grounds were landscaped in an Italianate style comprising gravelled walks between parterres, with fountains and basins. (Note: The connection between the Powis landscape and that of the French château was identified by contemporaries. Thomas Pennant, an antiquarian, traveller and writer, and author of A Tour in Wales, 1770, described Powis as being "in the wretched taste of St Germain en Laye".) By 1705, despite the Herberts' absence, the water garden was completed. John Bridgeman, a guest in that year, wrote "the waterworks and fountains are much beyond anything I ever saw, the cascade has two falls of water which concludes in a noble Bason (sic)."

The Powis water garden lasted just over 100 years, and was dismantled by 1809, on the advice of William Emes. Emes, who trained under Capability Brown, swept away the formal parterres and proposed the demolition of the terraces by explosives. The Earl rejected his advice regarding the terraces, although the lowest two were reduced to earthen banks, but permitted the replacement of the water garden with the Great Lawn. The water garden had comprised a series of pools and fountains, interspersed with flower beds and decorated with an array of statuary, a number of which, such as the Fame and the Hercules were relocated to different sites on the estate.

=== The Terraces ===
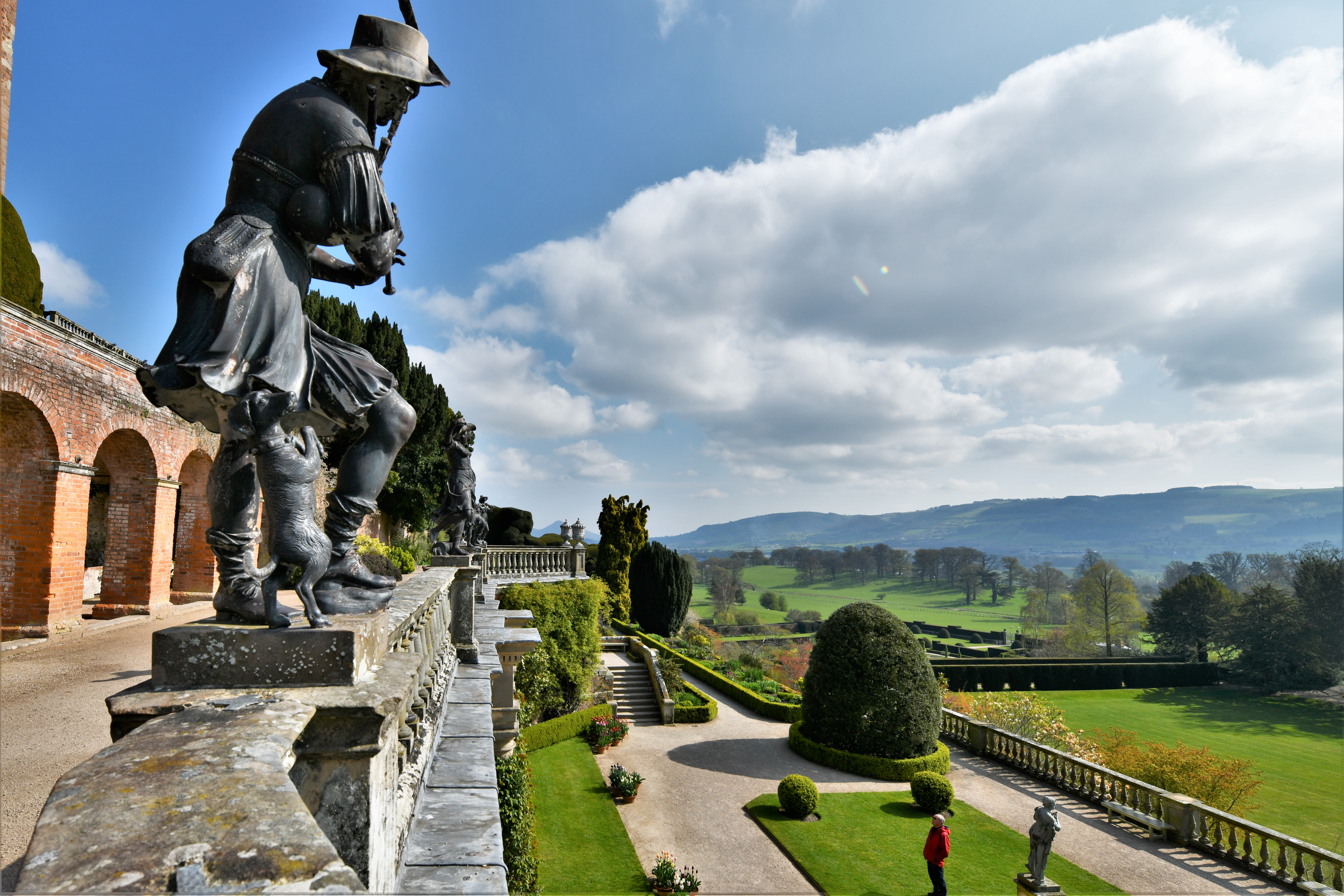
View along the Aviary Terrace

Four of the terraces remain, the last two having reverted to banks of earth covered with shrubs. Each is 150m in length. The Top Terrace is planted with a range of yew trees, a distinctive feature at Powis. Originally tightly clipped in the form of obelisks, they have grown into an array of amorphous shapes. The 14 "tumps" on the Top Terrace, and the hedge at its eastern end, were planted by the 2nd Marquess in the 1720s. The darker Irish yews elsewhere in the garden date from the following century. Below is the Aviary Terrace, the site of a bird house, which is decorated with four statues of shepherds and shepherdesses by John Nost. They were once painted in colours, but are now treated with a uniform grey weather-resistant paint. The third level is the Orangery Terrace, which houses an orangery. When built this was heated and was open to the elements, but in the early 20th century the arcade was enclosed with windows and a door case moved from the main entrance to the keep in the Outer Courtyard. A lead statue of a peacock on this terrace came originally from Claremont, Robert Clive's country house in Surrey. The last remaining terrace is the Apple Bank. Helena Attlee, in her The Gardens of Wales, notes the varied planting styles, sub-tropical on the Top Terrace, Mediterranean on the Aviary Terrace, and British double-herbaceous borders on the Orangery Terrace.

=== Later work ===
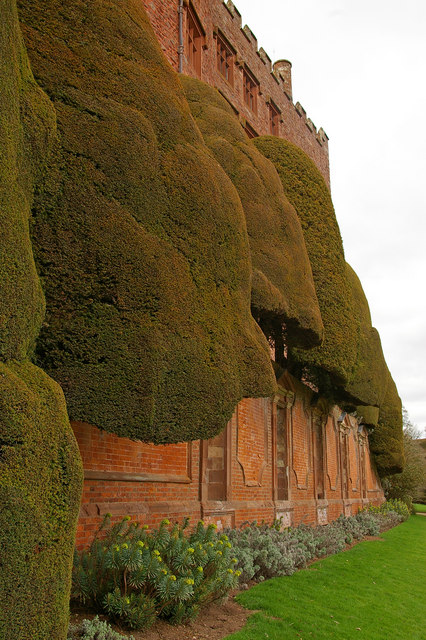
The Powis yews on the Top Terrace

William Emes, apart from the destruction of the water garden, did make improvements to the estate. A road that cut through the park just below the castle was diverted, and much planting was undertaken on the Wilderness Ridge, the line of hills opposite the castle, on the other side of the Great Lawn. The last major transformation of the gardens was undertaken in the early 20th century by Violet, wife of the fourth earl. Her ambition was "to turn a poor and meagre garden into one of the most beautiful, if not the most beautiful, in England and Wales".

Violet's work included the relocation of the entire kitchen garden, including its glasshouses, to a new position behind the Wilderness ridge and the laying out of the formal garden at the base of the terraces, and a fountain garden and a croquet lawn in the far south-eastern corner. The kitchen garden had previously been concealed from the castle by a bank of elm trees, but these were brought down in a storm in 1912, exposing a view of the greenhouses which appalled the Countess. "I am greeted every day by the repulsive sight of the detestable little [hot]houses which stare in their naked horror up at the beautiful terraces and the grand old castle towering above."

== Gallery ==
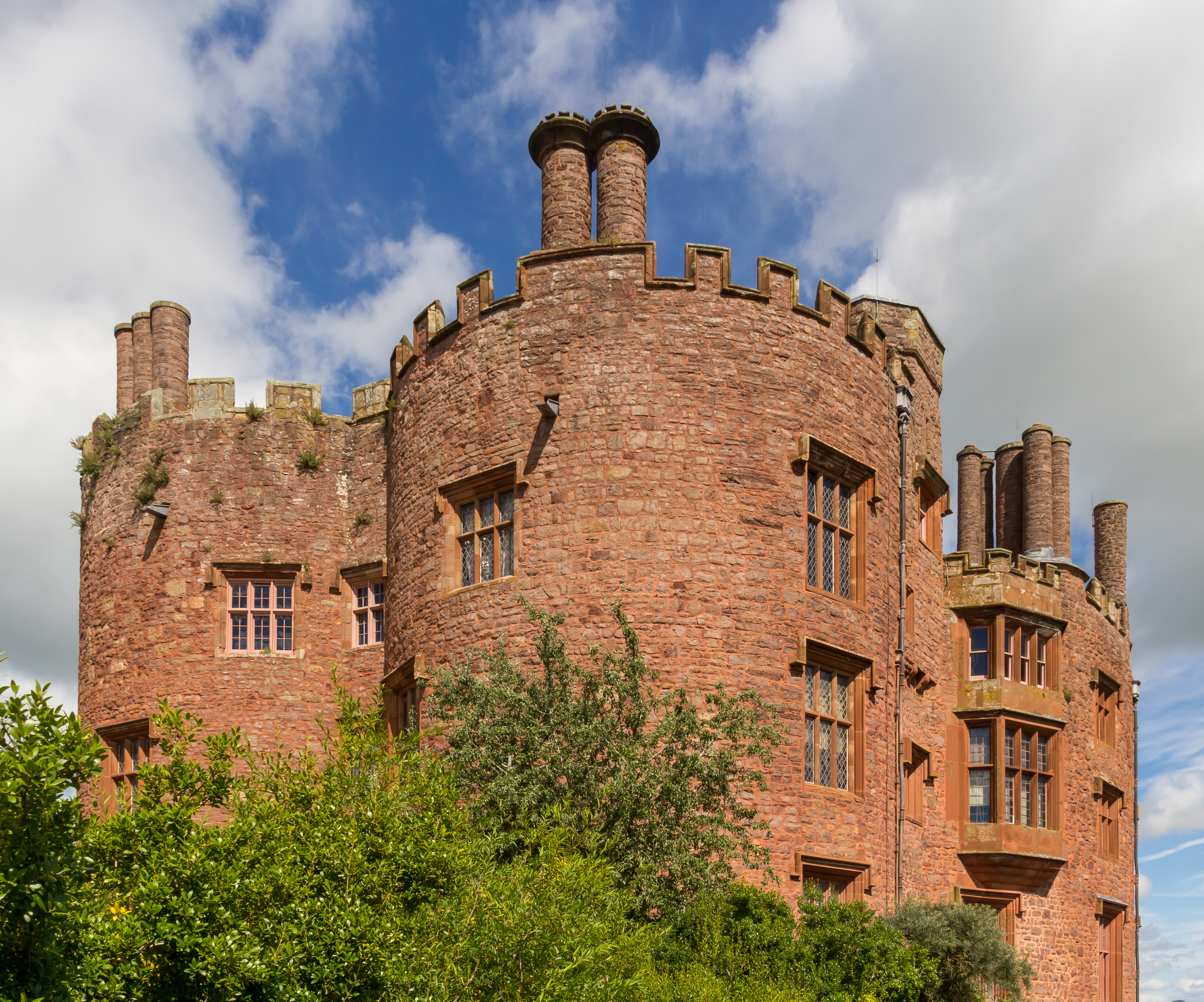
Detail of the drum towers

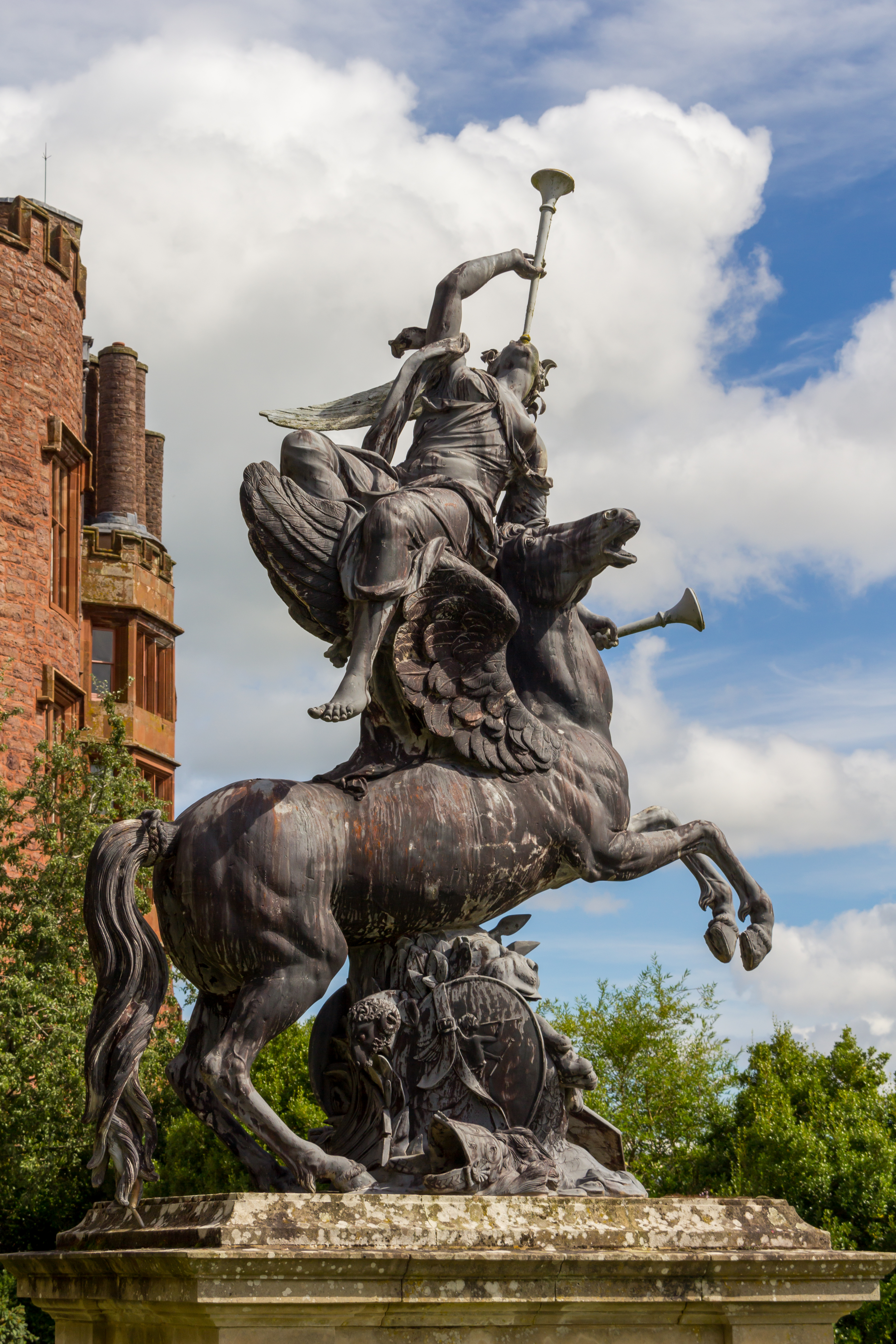
The Fame statue

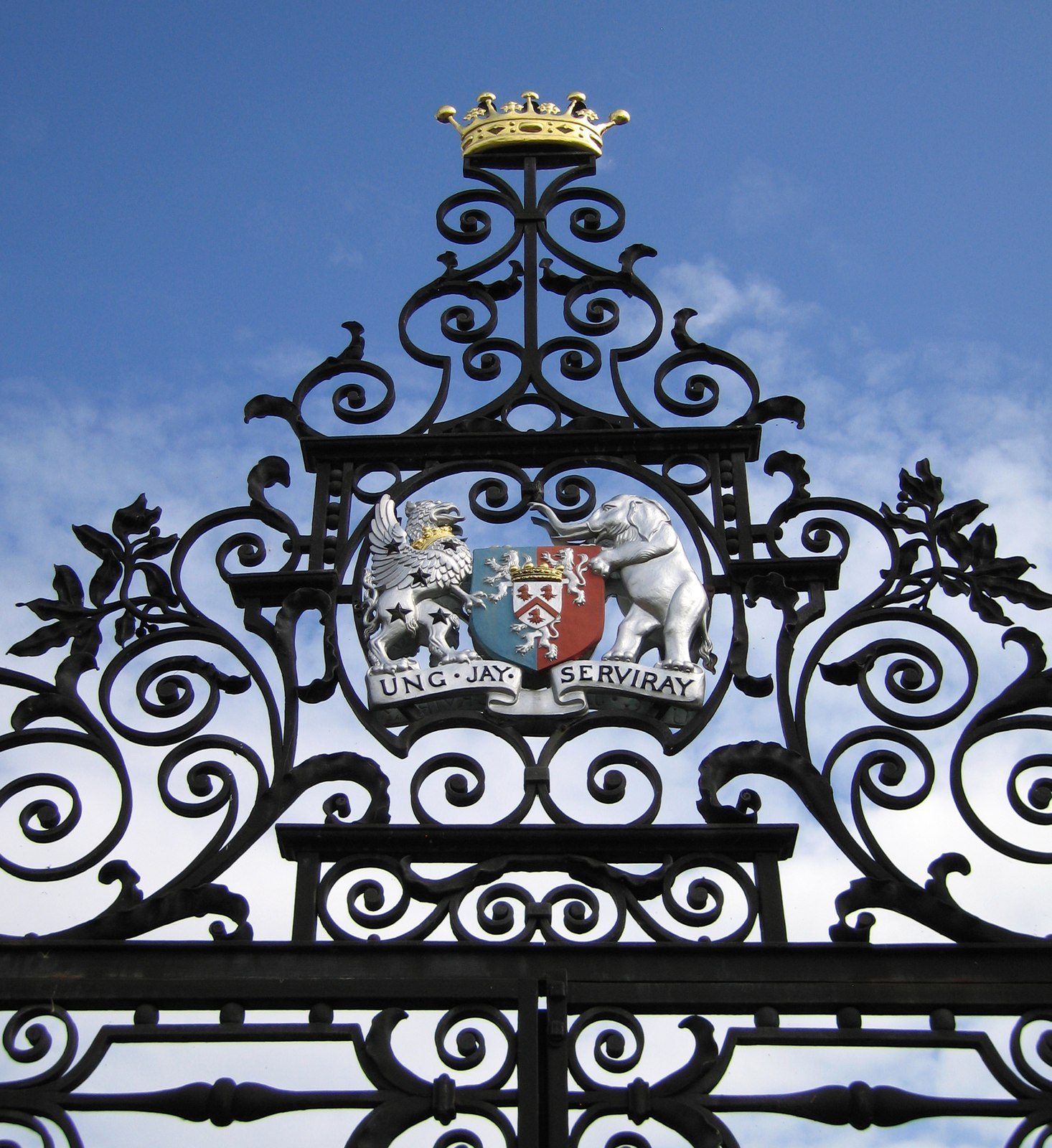
Detail of the Fountain Garden gateway

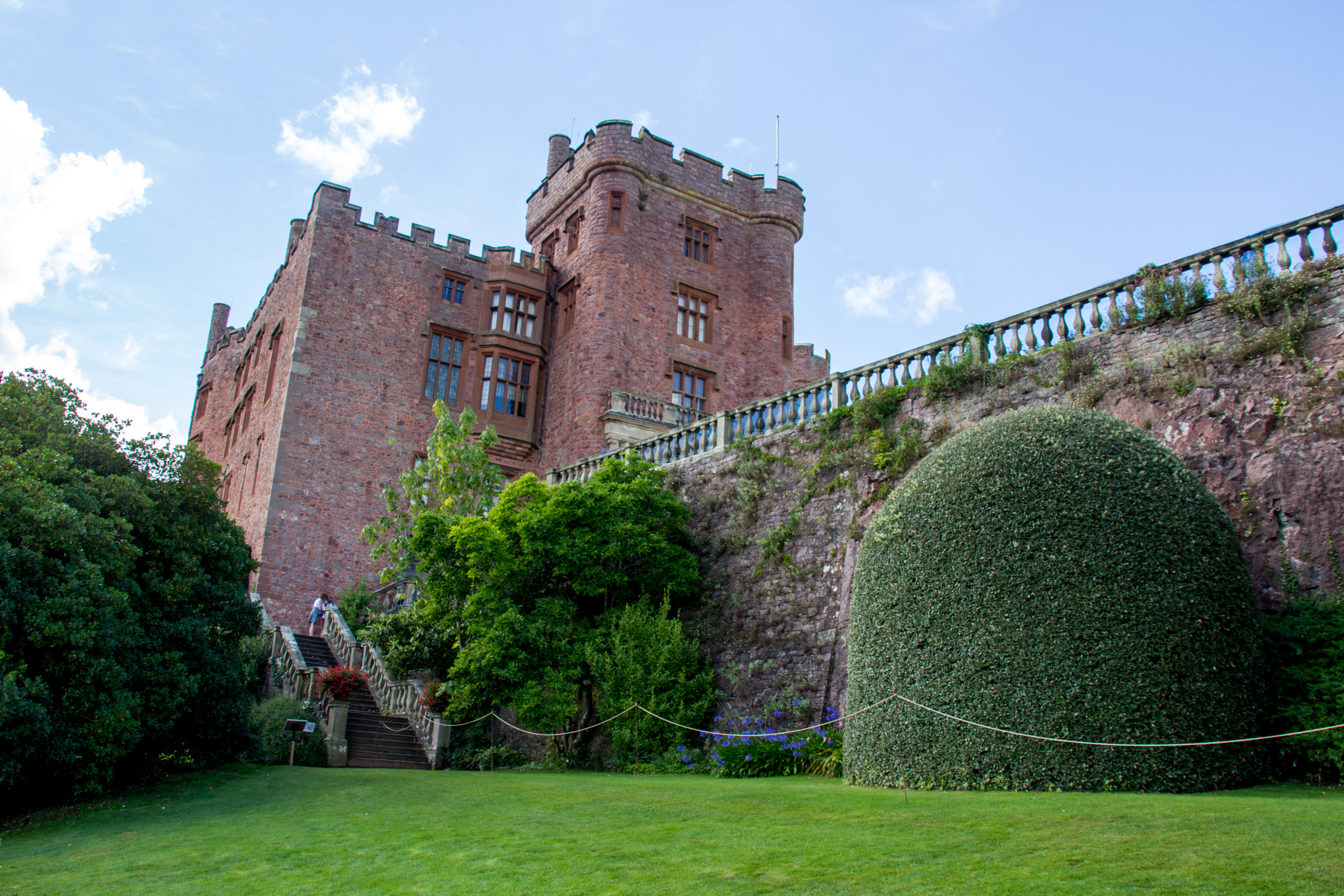
Parapet to the Marquess Gate

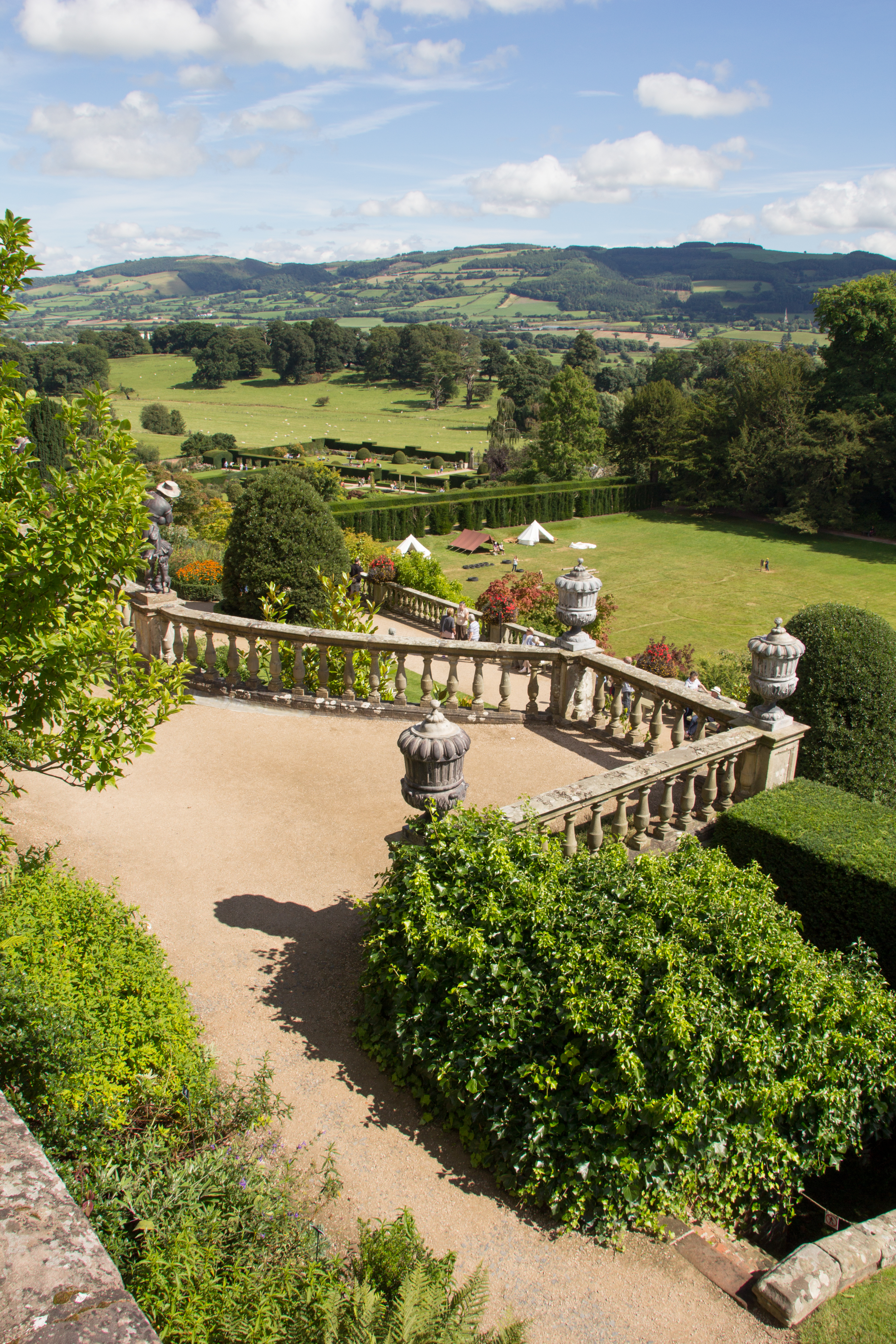
View from the castle

== See also ==
- List of castles in Wales
- List of gardens in Wales
- Powis House – the family's former London residence

== Sources ==
- Arnold, Christopher J. (1993). "Powis Castle: The Development of the Structure". Montgomeryshire Collections. 81: 97–110.
- Aslet, Clive (2013). An Exuberant Catalogue of Dreams. London: Aurum Press. ISBN 9781781310946.
- Attlee, Helena (2009). The Gardens of Wales. London: Frances Lincoln. ISBN 978-0-711-22882-5.
- Davis, Paul R. (2007). Castles of the Welsh Princes (2nd ed.). Talybont: Y Lolfa. ISBN 978-0-862-43970-5. OCLC 1118347422.
- Davis, Paul R. (2021). Towers of Defiance: Castles and Fortifications of the Welsh Princes (1st ed.). Talybont: Y Lolfa. ISBN 978-1-912-63130-8.
- Gallagher, Jane (1993). Powis Castle. Swindon, UK: National Trust. OCLC 500125657.
- Greeves, Lydia (2008). Houses of the National Trust. London, UK: National Trust. ISBN 978-1-905-40066-9.
- Hall, Michael (2014). George Frederick Bodley and the later Gothic Revival in Britain and America. New Haven, US and London: Yale University Press. ISBN 978-0-300-20802-3. OCLC 983761471.
- Harris, Sue (2012). Powis Castle. Swindon, UK: National Trust. ISBN 978-1-843-59410-9. OCLC 1118012098.
- Jenkins, Simon (2008). Wales: Churches, Houses, Castles. London: Penguin. ISBN 978-0-713-99893-1.
- Kenyon, John R. (2010). The Medieval Castles of Wales. Cardiff: University of Wales Press. ISBN 978-0-708-32363-2. OCLC 693942235.
- Lacey, Stephen (1992). Powis Castle Gardens. Swindon, UK: National Trust. ISBN 978-1-843-59121-4. OCLC 224063243.
- Laing, Alastair (1995). In Trust for the Nation: Paintings from National Trust Houses. Swindon, UK: National Trust. ISBN 978-0-707-80260-2. OCLC 610890491.
- Montgomery-Massingberd, Hugh (1994). Great Houses of England and Wales. London: Lawrence King Publishing. ISBN 978-1-780-67232-8. OCLC 31662164.
- Morgan, Gerald (2008). Castles in Wales: A Handbook. Talybont: Y Lolfa. ISBN 978-1-847-71031-4.
- Nicolson, Nigel (1968). Great Houses Of Britain. London: Hamlyn. OCLC 427247368.
- Scourfield, Robert; Richard, Haslam (2013). Powys: Montgomeryshire, Radnorshire and Breconshire. The Buildings of Wales. New Haven and London: Yale University Press. ISBN 978-0-300-18508-9. OCLC 935421607.
- Spurgeon, C.J. (1966). "The castles of Montgomeryshire". Montgomeryshire Collections. 59: 1–59.
- Stephenson, David (2007). "Powis Castle: A Reappraisal of its Medieval Development". Montgomeryshire Collections. 95: 9–21.
- Watts, Siobhan; Lithgow, Richard; Sandham, Gareth (2020). "Structural Investigations of a Seventeenth-Century Staircase and Wall Paintings at Powis Castle, Wales". APT Bulletin: The Journal of Preservation Technology. 51 (4): 13–18.
- Whittle, Elisabeth (1992). The Historic Gardens of Wales. Cardiff: CADW. ISBN 978-0-117-01578-4.
