= Southern Powys (medieval) =

Welsh kingdom (1160–1283)

Coordinates: 53°14′N 4°1′W

Southern Powys Powys Wenwynwyn (Welsh)
- 1160 – 1309
- Banner of Southern Powys Coat of arms of Southern Powys

- The divisions of Powys in about 1200
- Capital: Welshpool
- Common languages: Middle Welsh
- Government: Monarchy
  - 1160–1195: Owain Cyfeiliog
  - 1195–1216: Gwenwynwyn ab Owain
  - 1241–1286: Gruffudd ap Gwenwynwyn
  - 1286–1293: Owen de la Pole
  - 1293–1309: Gruffudd de la Pole
  - 1309: Hawys Gadarn
- Historical era: Middle Ages
  - Death of Madog ap Maredudd and Llywelyn ap Madog: 1160
  - Wedding of Hawys Gadarn and John Charlton: July 1309
Preceded by	Succeeded by
Kingdom of Powys	Welsh Marches
- Today part of: Wales

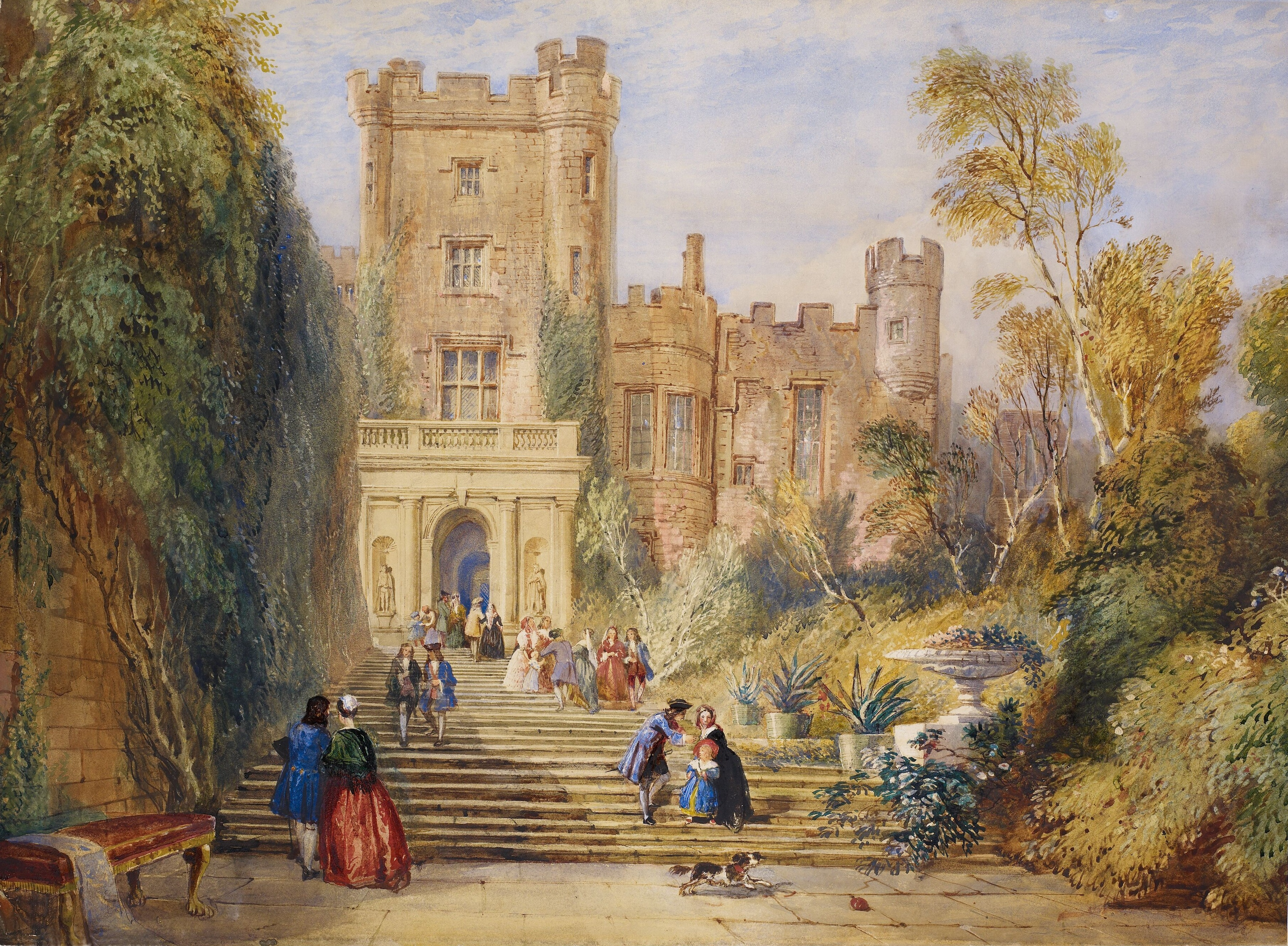
Painting of Powys Castle by artist David Cox

Southern Powys or Powys Wenwynwyn (Welsh for 'Gwenwynwyn's Powys'), was a Welsh lordship which existed during the high Middle Ages. The realm was the southern portion of the former princely state of Powys which split following the death of Madog ap Maredudd and the killing of his heir Llywelyn in 1160: the northern portion (Maelor) went to Gruffydd Maelor and eventually became known as Powys Fadog; while the southern portion (Cyfeiliog) going to Owain Cyfeiliog and becoming known, eventually, as Powys Wenwynwyn after Prince Gwenwynwyn ab Owain, its second ruler.

Southern Powys and Gwynedd became bitter rivals in the years that followed, with the former frequently allying itself with England to further its aims of weakening the latter.

== Princes of Southern Powys ==
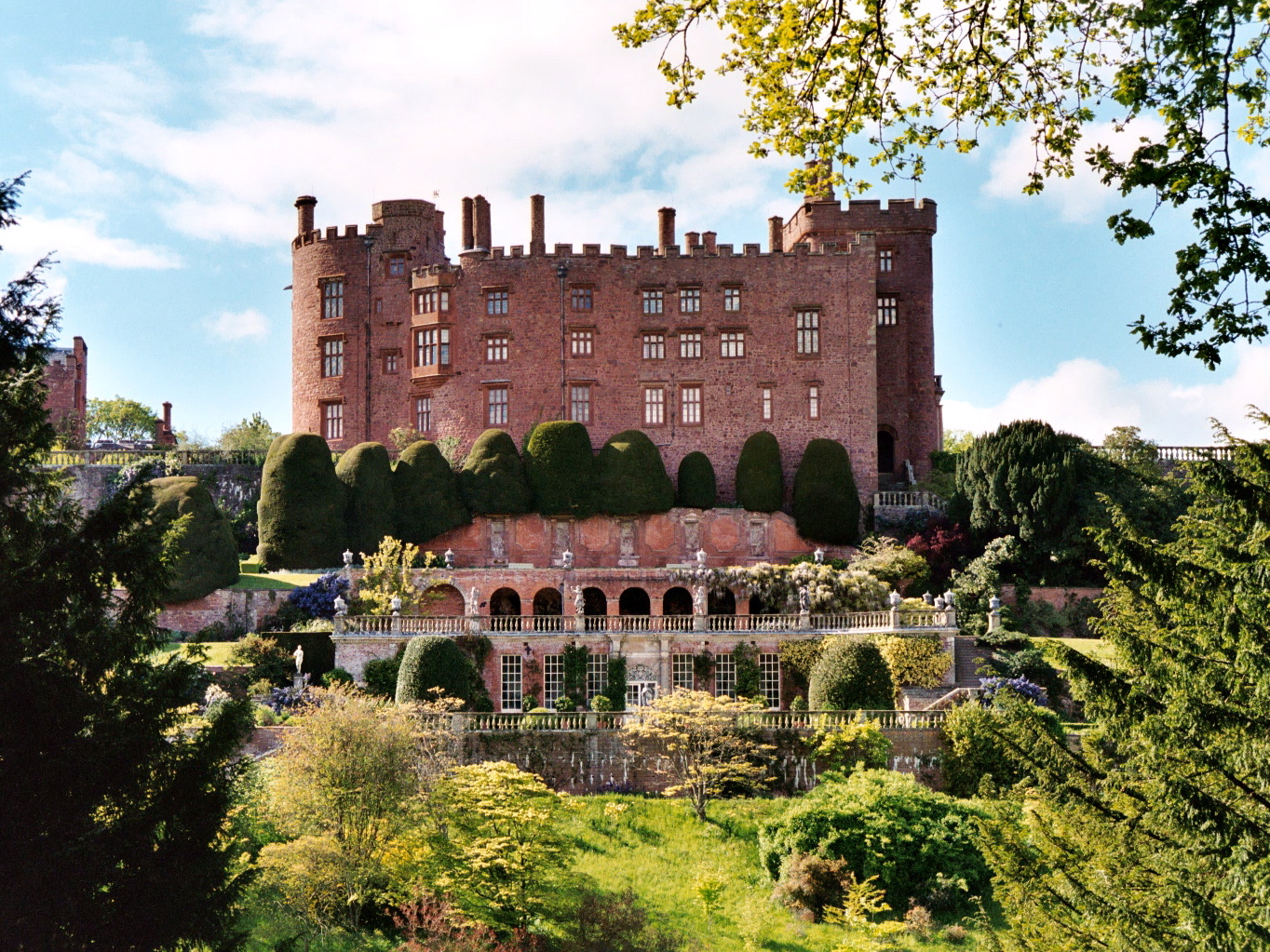
Powis Castle, royal seat of the princes of Wenwynwyn

- 1160–1195 Owain Cyfeiliog married a daughter of Owain Gwynedd and abdicated in 1195.
- 1195–1216 Gwenwynwyn ab Owain

Gwenwynwyn seized the cantref of Arwystli in 1197, when he was aligned with England. Following the marriage of Llywelyn the Great and Joan of England in 1208, warfare broke out once more between Gwenwynwyn and Llywelyn. In 1212 Gwenwynwyn's ancient royal seat at Mathrafal was destroyed and he was evicted from his territories. He changed allegiance again and was restored to his realm in 1215, making a new capital at Welshpool. In 1216 he was defeated in battle with the forces of Llywelyn and fled to England, where he died shortly afterwards. He was succeeded by his son.

- 1216–1286 Gruffydd ap Gwenwynwyn

Gruffydd ap Gwenwynwyn spent his youth in England, maintained by King Henry III of England. He did not return to Wales until 1241 after the death of Llywelyn and when he was invested with the lordships of Arwystli, Cyfeiliog, Mawddwy, Caereinion, Ystrad Marchell and Upper Mochnant by Henry III. At some time before this, he married Hawise, daughter of John Le Strange, Lord of Knockin Castle.

He transferred his allegiance back to Llywelyn ap Gruffudd in 1263 before returning to England's protection again after 1276, following a failed plot to murder Prince Llywelyn in collusion with his rival's brother, Dafydd ap Gruffydd. His forces, commanded by his son Owain ap Gruffydd ap Gwenwynwyn, mobilised during the Welsh War of 1282–1283 with those of John Le Strange and Hugh le Despenser and it was their soldiers who ambushed and killed the last native Prince of Wales near Builth in 1282.

== End of the Principality ==
Owain ap Gruffydd ap Gwenwynwyn (alias Owen de la Pole) allegedly surrendered the principality of Powys to Edward I at the Parliament held in Shrewsbury in 1283 (Dafydd ap Gruffudd, his rival in Powys Fadog was tried at the same Parliament, he was deposed for fighting on the wrong side and executed for treason against Edward). In return for surrendering the principality, he received it again from the king as a free Baron of England "sub nomine et tenura liberi Baronagii Angliæ, resignando Domino Regi heredibus suis et Coronæ Angliæ nomen et circulum principatus." ("Under the name and tenure of the free baronage of England, by resigning together with his heirs to the Lord the King and the Crown of England the princely name and coronet") The date should be accepted with reserve because Owen did not succeed his father in possession until 1286: it is possible that Owen was acting on behalf of his father, who was by then an old man. From about that time, the former princely family began using the Normanised surname "de la Pole" instead of Welsh patronymics. The name derives from Pool (now called Welshpool), his principal town.

== The Lordship of Powys ==
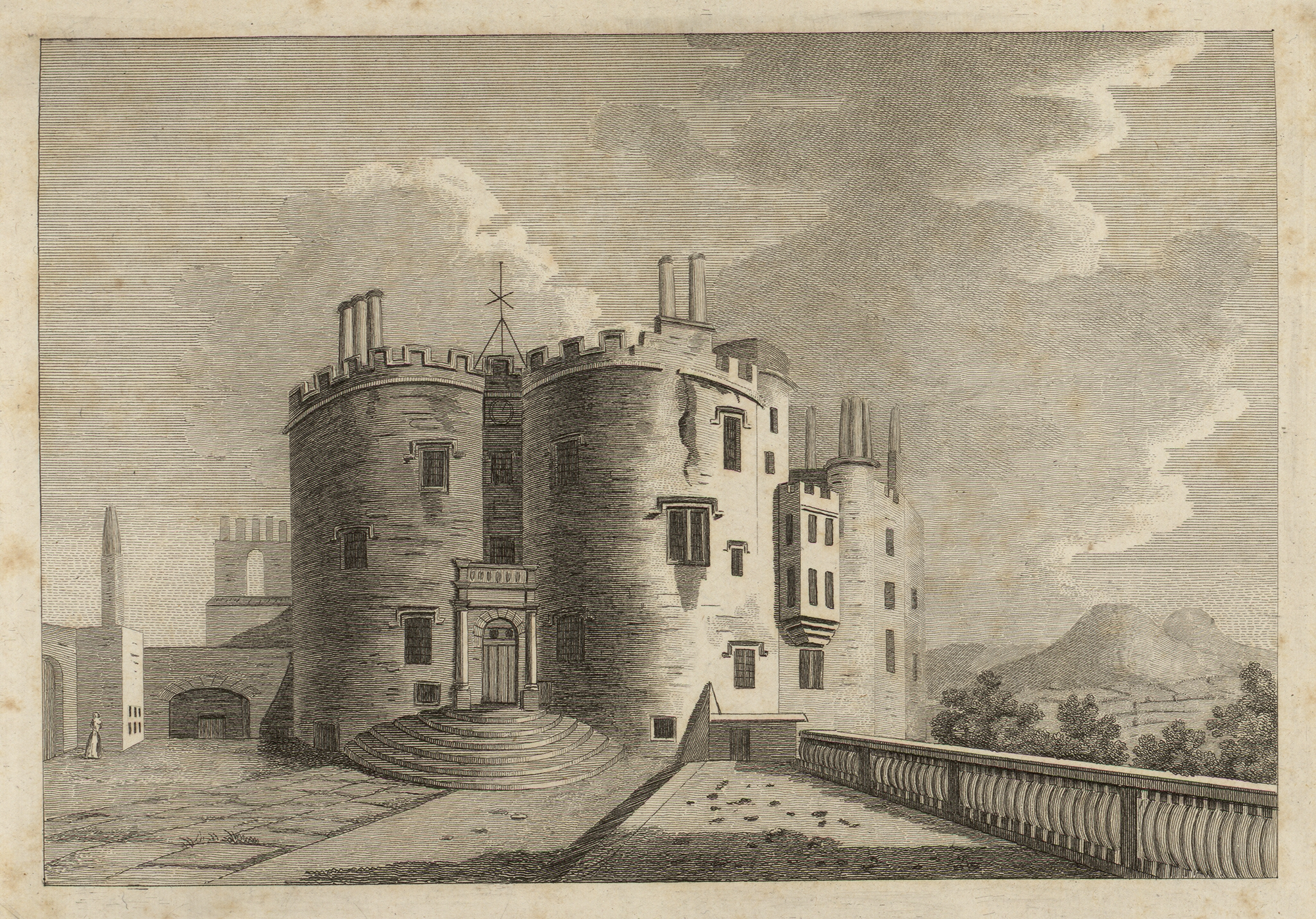
Powis castle entrance engraving

After the Statute of Rhuddlan in 1284 all of the other old princely titles in Wales also ceased to exist; and henceforth, except the Kingdom of Scotland after 1344, the English Crown did not recognise the title of "prince" or "king" in any native dynasty other than their own. However, the principality continued as a marcher lordship.

The ruling family of Powys survived in the children and remoter descendants of Gruffydd ap Gwenwynwyn, henceforth known as the de la Pole family, who lived in the newly built Powis Castle. In 1293 Owen de la Pole died and was succeeded by his son Griffith de la Pole. Owen also had several brothers, whom he enfeoffed as his feudal tenants with lordships within his lordship. However, none of them left children except William de la Pole (of Mawddwy), who had the lordship of Mawddwy, comprising that parish and most of Mallwyd. When Griffith de la Pole died without heirs in 1309, the lordship was then inherited (according to English law) by his sister Hawise "Gadarn" ("Hawise the Strong", often simply referred to as "The Lady of Powis"), rather than to the male heirs (as prescribed by Welsh law). She died in 1349 and on the death of her husband John Charleton, 1st Baron Cherleton in 1353, the lordship passed to their children and thence out of native Welsh hands.

=== Marcher Lords of Powys ===
- Gruffydd ap Gwenwynwyn also known as Gruffydd de la Pole (died 1286 or 1287)
- Owen de la Pole, his son (died 1293) (see also: William de la Pole (of Mawddwy))
- Gruffydd de la Pole, his son (died 1309)
- Hawise Gadarn, Lady of Powys, daughter of Owen, married John Charleton, 1st Baron Cherleton (1268–1353)
- John Charleton, 2nd Baron Cherleton (died 1360)
- John Charleton, 3rd Baron Cherleton (1334 – 13 July 1374)
- John Charleton, 4th Baron Cherleton (1362–1401)
- Edward Charleton, 5th Baron Cherleton KG (1371–1421), his brother.

His heiresses were:

- Joan de Cherleton (c. 1400–1425), wife of John Grey, 1st Earl of Tankerville whose son was
  - Henry Grey, 2nd Earl of Tankerville whose son was
  - Richard Grey, 3rd Earl of Tankerville whose son was
  - John Grey, 1st Baron Grey of Powis whose son was
  - John Grey, 2nd Baron Grey of Powis (1485–1504) married Margaret, daughter of Edward Sutton, 2nd Baron Dudley, whose son was
  - Edward Grey, 3rd Baron Grey of Powis (succeeded to the title as an infant; died 1551).
- Joyce Charleton of Cherleton, wife of John Tiptoft, 1st Baron Tiptoft, whose daughter, also Joyce, carried the Tiptoft portion of the Cherleton inheritance to the family of her husband Sir Edmund Sutton of Dudley, which their grandson John Sutton, 3rd Baron Dudley, "Lord Quondam", sold to his nephew, the 3rd (and last) Baron Grey of Powis, circa 1538.

=== Beyond the Marcher Lordship ===
The Laws in Wales Acts 1535–1542 abolished the feudal rights of the Lords of Powis and saw the territory of the Lordship of Powis almost entirely incorporated within the new county of Montgomeryshire. However, the lordship continued to exist as a great landed estate.

- Edward Grey, 3rd Baron Grey of Powis (died 1551).
- Edward Grey of London, his illegitimate son, sold the lordship (no longer a marcher lordship) to his kinsman Sir Edward Herbert in 1587.
- Sir Edward Herbert, a blood relative of both descendant branches of the Cherleton Barony.
- Sir William Herbert was created Baron Powis in 1629.

The estate then descended to successive holders of the titles Baron Powis, Marquess of Powis, and Earl of Powis.
