= Hawys Gadarn =

Welsh noblewoman (c. 1291 – c. 1350)

Hawys ferch Owain
- Fourteenth-century stained glass depicting Hawys in St Mary the Virgin, Shrewsbury
- Born: c. 1291
- Died: c. 1350
- Buried: Probably Greyfriars, Shrewsbury
- Noble family: Lleision
- Spouse: John Charlton (m. 1309)
- Issue: John Charlton II (died 1360); Lewis Charlton (died 1369) and others: Owain, lord of Lydham (died 1368); Edward; William; Gruffudd; Humphrey; Thomas; Nicholas; Isabella, married; John Sutton II of Malpas
- Father: Owain ap Gruffudd
- Mother: Joan Corbet

Hawys ferch Owain or Hawys de la Pole (c. 1291 – c. 1350), known in later tradition as Hawys Gadarn ('Hawys the Strong'), was the fourteenth-century heiress of the lordship of Powys. She was the granddaughter of Gruffudd ap Gwenwynwyn, the daughter of his eldest son, Owain. Following the death of her only brother, Gruffudd ab Owain, in June 1309, Hawys succeeded to the lordship and was married within weeks to John Charlton, a Shropshire knight of modest origins then rising in the household of Edward II. Through this marriage the lordship passed to the Charlton family, in whose hands it remained one of the few marcher lordships still outside the possession of the Crown in 1536.

Hawys's succession was contested by her uncle, Gruffudd ap Gruffudd, the only surviving son of Gruffudd ap Gwenwynwyn, who argued that Southern Powys was held by Welsh custom, under which land could be inherited only in the male line. The dispute became entangled with the struggle between Edward II and the Lords Ordainers; in 1312 Gruffudd, backed by Thomas, earl of Lancaster, besieged Hawys and her husband in Welshpool castle, and the quarrel continued intermittently until Gruffudd's death in 1332.

The epithet Cadarn is not found in contemporary records and appears to be the invention of sixteenth-century antiquaries. The historian Richard Morgan has argued that the tradition surrounding 'Hawys Gadarn' conflates Hawys with her grandmother and namesake, Hawise Lestrange, a resourceful figure who held custody of Powys during her granddaughter's childhood, and that if either woman merits the name it is the grandmother.

== Early life ==
Hawys was descended from the princes of southern Powys. Her grandfather, Gruffudd ap Gwenwynwyn (c. 1216–1286), had recovered Southern Powys in 1241 and, after breaking with Llywelyn ap Gruffudd in 1274, remained firmly loyal to Edward I of England. He appears to have regarded himself as a marcher lord rather than a Welsh baron, and his sons adopted the surname de la Pole, after the castle-borough of Welshpool, in place of the Welsh patronymic. (Note: The patronymic nonetheless persisted: Owain occasionally appears as Owain ap Gruffudd even in English records, and his brother Gruffudd's seal reads Griffinus filius Griffini de Powys. In English records the family appear as Owain (Owen) and Gruffudd (Griffin) de la Pole, and Hawys as Hawys or Hawise de la Pole.) Gruffudd married Hawys Lestrange, daughter of John le Strange of Knockin, before 24 February 1242. This elder Hawys styled herself on her seal domina de Keveoloc, lady of Cyfeiliog, and bore the arms of both Powys and Lestrange.

Owain ap Gruffudd, the eldest son, succeeded his father in 1286 and died in 1293. His heir, Gruffudd ab Owain, was only two years old on 22 March 1293. Hawys, his sister, was "not a twin but very close in age to him", and was therefore probably born about 1291. Their mother, Joan, daughter of Robert Corbet of Moreton, received her widow's third in dower and custody of the infant heir, but the bulk of Owain's lands passed in 1295 into the custody of his mother, Hawys Lestrange.

The 1290s and early 1300s were marked by violent quarrels within the family. Joan, who had remarried to Roger Trumwyn of Cannock, complained repeatedly that her late husband's brothers had seized her dower lands; in 1298–1299 Hawys Lestrange herself was among those accused of breaking into her manor of Mathrafal. By about 1306 all of Gruffudd ap Gwenwynwyn's sons save one, Gruffudd ap Gruffudd, were dead.

== Heiress of Powys ==
=== Succession and marriage ===
In 1308 Gruffudd ap Gruffudd succeeded his mother as custodian of the barony, but Gruffudd ab Owain soon petitioned for seisin, and on or shortly before 26 June 1308 Edward II granted him his father's lands. He enjoyed them for barely a year, dying in June 1309 at the age of seventeen, whereupon his lands were taken into the king's hands by Roger Mortimer of Chirk, justice of Wales. His death left Hawys as heiress. On 10 August 1309 Edward II ordered that, once the inquisition post mortem had been held, she should be granted custody "as hastily as possible according to the law and usage of the realm"; Morgan suggests that the choice of phrase "may have been deliberate", anticipating a challenge founded on Welsh custom.

Between 6 and 26 August 1309 Hawys was married to John Charlton, and seisin of the barony passed to the couple, subject to the dower of her brother's widow, Ela. Charlton's origins were obscure: his family held a single carucate of poor land at Charlton, near Wellington in Shropshire, of the abbot of Shrewsbury, and he was probably born about 1278–1280. He had entered the household of Edward of Caernarfon shortly before the latter's accession and had probably returned from Ireland, where he held minor office, in time for the marriage. Morgan describes Hawys as "a great prize as the heiress of one of the largest marcher lordships". Thomas Charlton, later bishop of Hereford, and Alan Charlton of Apley were his brothers.

Hawys Lestrange died in November 1310, and her lands, concentrated around Welshpool, passed to her granddaughter. They were formally granted to Hawys and Charlton on 18 August 1311, Charlton having done homage to Edward II at Nottingham for the barony on 8 August.

=== Dispute with Gruffudd ap Gruffudd ===
The quarrel between Hawys's husband and her uncle seems to have begun over a tenurial question. Under a partition of 1291, Gruffudd ap Gruffudd was to hold the commote of Mechain Is Coed only during the lifetime of Hawys Lestrange, receiving Deuddwr on her death. On the elder Hawys's death in 1310 he obtained Deuddwr but declined to surrender Mechain Is Coed, while Charlton may have tried to seize the whole commote, including Gruffudd's adjoining manor of Dinas, held of the Crown in chief.

The dispute quickly widened into a contest for the barony itself. In October 1311 Gruffudd asked the king's council for a ruling as to whether the lands of Powys were held "in Welshry" or of the crown of England. The question touched the dignity of the Crown, and Edward II forbade his chancellor to give any such ruling without a special royal command. By claiming the benefit of Welsh law, Gruffudd implied that Powys could descend only in the male line, so that, in the words of the Elizabethan historian David Powel, "a woman was not capable of lands in that countrie". Practice in the March was, however, far from settled, and Welsh customary practice was itself tending to accept female succession.

In March 1312, as relations between the king and the Ordainers deteriorated, Gruffudd laid siege to Welshpool castle, where Hawys and Charlton were present. Edward's orders to raise the siege proved ineffective, and it was not relieved until about September 1312. A royal commission of 26 December 1312, appointed to hear the complaints of Charlton and Hawys, recorded that Gruffudd and his adherents had come "with horses, arms, and banners displayed" to the castle of La Pole, besieged it, burned its doors and the couple's houses, broken and hunted their park, cut their grass and corn, fished their stews and carried off their horses and colts.

Gruffudd had by then become a retainer of the earl of Lancaster, who took up his cause in order to embarrass the king. Charlton, for his part, secured the support of Roger Mortimer of Wigmore, whose daughter Matilda was betrothed to Charlton's eldest son, John. Both parties were pardoned in November 1313, and Gruffudd had failed to establish his claim to the barony.

The dispute revived in 1316, when the people of Powys again besieged Welshpool castle and Gruffudd renewed his allegation that he had been dispossessed of Powys. When the case came before the king at Westminster on 25 April 1316, Charlton appeared in person, while Hawys was represented by two attorneys, Hugh Gregory and Robert de Laak. Gruffudd failed to attend; Charlton and Hawys, for their part, argued that as Gruffudd was their tenant they had the right to judge his transgressions.

Charlton's own disaffection from Edward II during the Despenser War of 1321–1322 led to his capture and the temporary seizure of Powys, but he was pardoned in September 1322. After a further series of forcible ejections between 1327 and 1331, the quarrel ended with Gruffudd's death, without a son, some time after 18 March 1332. Thereafter, Charlton's possession of the barony was never seriously challenged.

== Later life ==
Hawys and her husband used the barony to provide for their numerous sons. By fines of 26 April 1317 and Easter 1319 they enfeoffed their son Thomas with the castle and manor of La Pole, and Charlton enfeoffed other members of his family with portions of the barony during the same years.

In June 1337, while Charlton was attending a council at Stamford, Roger Lestrange, steward of the earl of Arundel and a kinsman of Hawys Lestrange, invaded Powys with English and Welsh followers and demanded hostages from Hawys, "to the injury of the king's peace, chiefly because the Welsh, from lightness of head, may rise in war". Later that month Edward III appointed Charlton justiciar of Ireland, and in October he sailed with his wife, his children and two hundred Welsh foot soldiers. A fine of 12 May 1342, settling the manor of Dinas, named John and Hawys in remainder.

Hawys died about 1350, predeceasing her husband, who died in 1353. She was probably buried in the Franciscan friary at Shrewsbury.

== Marriages and family ==
Hawys married John Charlton between 6 and 26 August 1309. The marriage produced ten recorded children:

- John Charlton II (born 1311 × 1316, died 1360), who married Matilda, daughter of Roger Mortimer, earl of March; he was said to be thirty-seven in 1353.
- Owain, lord of Lydham (died 1368), penteulu
- Edward
- William, a cleric
- Master Gruffudd (living 1345–1372)
- Humphrey, doctor of theology and regent at Oxford (living 1359–1372)
- Thomas
- Nicholas
- Lewis Charlton, bishop of Hereford 1361–1369 (died 1369)
- Isabella, who married John Sutton II, lord of Malpas

== Legacy ==
=== Commemoration ===
Hawys and Charlton are both commemorated in the Jesse window of St Mary's Church, Shrewsbury.

=== 'Hawys Gadarn' in later tradition ===
The name 'Hawys Gadarn' derives from the sixteenth-century antiquaries. David Powel, translating and expanding upon Humphrey Llwyd, wrote that "Owen ap Griffyuth had issue one onelie daughter his heire, named Hawys Gadarn, that is, Hawys the hardie, against whom her vncles, Lhewelyn, Iohn, Gruffyuth Vachan, and Dauid arose ... affirming that a woman was not capable of lands in that countrie". Powel's account appears to derive ultimately from a Welsh source surviving in five manuscripts, which describe Hawys Gadarn as the wife of John Charlton and relate how Llywelyn, Ieuan and Dafydd made war upon her and were imprisoned in Harlech Castle for doing so.

This tradition cannot be reconciled with the record evidence. Of the four uncles named, Llywelyn had died in 1294, and Ieuan and Dafydd were both dead by about 1305–1306, before their niece inherited; only Gruffudd ap Gruffudd survived to oppose her. The antiquarian accounts appear rather to conflate the family quarrels of 1288–1290 and 1295–1298, in which Hawys the elder was a party, with the dispute of 1312–1322, and so to combine the two Hawyses into one. Since the epithet was "not apparently a contemporary name", Morgan concludes that if either woman should bear it, "then it was surely Hawys the elder; her grand-daughter is shadowy by comparison".

== Ancestry ==
Ancestors of Hawys Gadarn

16. Owain Cyfeiliog
8. Gwenwynwyn ab Owain Cyfeiliog
4. Gruffudd ap Gwenwynwyn
2. Owain ap Gruffudd
10. John le Strange of Knockin
5. Hawys le Strange
1. Hawys ferch Owain
6. Robert Corbet of Moreton
3. Joan Corbet

== Works cited ==
=== Primary sources ===
- Bartrum, P. C., ed. (1974). Welsh Genealogies: AD 300-1400. Cardiff: University of Wales Press. doi:10.20391/40837b6f-1887-4afd-9c6e-9b7e3a122693. ISBN 070830561X. Archived from the original on 6 June 2023.
- Capes, W. W., ed. (1913). Registrum Thome de Charlton, Episcopi Herefordensis, A.D. MCCCXXVII–MCCCXLIV. Canterbury and York Society (in Latin). London.
- Dugdale, William (1849). Caley, John; Ellis, Henry; Bandinel, Bulkeley (eds.). Monasticon Anglicanum (in Latin). London.
- Edwards, John Goronwy, ed. (1935). Calendar of Ancient Correspondence Concerning Wales. Cardiff: University of Wales Press.
  ——, ed. (1940). Littere Wallie preserved in Liber A in the Public Record Office. Cardiff: University of Wales Press. hdl:20.500.14106/0506. Archived from the original on 12 December 2025.
- Gilbert, John Thomas, ed. (1884). Chartularies of St. Mary's Abbey, Dublin. Rolls Series. Vol. II. London: HM Stationery Office.
- Maxwell Lyte, H.C., ed. (1892). Calendar of the Close Rolls Preserved in the Public Record Office: Edward II, A.D. 1307–1313. London: HM Stationery Office. IA CalendarOfCloseRolls_1307-1313.
  ——, ed. (1893a). Calendar of the Close Rolls Preserved in the Public Record Office: Edward II, A.D. 1313–1318. London: HM Stationery Office. IA cu31924091068993.
  ——, ed. (1893b). Calendar of the Patent Rolls Preserved in the Public Record Office: Edward III, A.D. 1330–1334. London: HM Stationery Office. IA calendarpatentr05offigoog.
  ——, ed. (1894). Calendar of the Patent Rolls Preserved in the Public Record Office: Edward II, A.D. 1307–1313. London: HM Stationery Office. IA calendarofpaten01grea.
  ——, ed. (1895a). Calendar of the Patent Rolls Preserved in the Public Record Office: Edward I, A.D. 1292–1301. London: HM Stationery Office. IA calendarofpatent03grea.
  ——, ed. (1895b). Calendar of the Patent Rolls Preserved in the Public Record Office: Edward III, A.D. 1334–1338. London: HM Stationery Office.
  ——, ed. (1898a). Calendar of the Close Rolls Preserved in the Public Record Office: Edward III, A.D. 1330–1333. London: HM Stationery Office. IA cu31924091767867.
  ——, ed. (1898b). Calendar of the Patent Rolls Preserved in the Public Record Office: Edward II, A.D. 1313–1317. London: HM Stationery Office. IA calendarofpaten02grea.
  ——, ed. (1900). Calendar of the Close Rolls Preserved in the Public Record Office: Edward III, A.D. 1337–1339. London: HM Stationery Office. IA cu31924091767883.
  ——, ed. (1903a). Calendar of the Charter Rolls Preserved in the Public Record Office. Vol. 1, Henry III, A.D. 1226–1257. London: HM Stationery Office. IA calendarcharter00stamgoog.
  ——, ed. (1903b). Calendar of the Patent Rolls Preserved in the Public Record Office: Edward II, A.D. 1317–1321. London: HM Stationery Office. IA calendarofpaten03grea.
  ——, ed. (1904a). Calendar of the Close Rolls Preserved in the Public Record Office: Edward I, A.D. 1288–1296. London: HM Stationery Office. IA calendarclosero01changoog.
  ——, ed. (1904b). Calendar of the Patent Rolls Preserved in the Public Record Office: Edward II, A.D. 1321–1324. London: HM Stationery Office. IA calendarofpaten04grea.
  ——, ed. (1906). Inquisitions and Assessments Relating to Feudal Aids, with Other Analogous Documents Preserved in the Public Record Office, A.D. 1284–1431. Vol. 4, Northampton–Somerset. London: HM Stationery Office.
  ——, ed. (1908a). Calendar of the Charter Rolls Preserved in the Public Record Office. Vol. 3, Edward I – Edward II, A.D. 1300–1326. London: HM Stationery Office. IA calendarcharter00cunngoog.
  ——, ed. (1908b). Calendar of the Close Rolls Preserved in the Public Record Office: Edward I, A.D. 1302–1307. London: HM Stationery Office. IA calendarofclose05grea.
  ——, ed. (1911). Calendar of the Fine Rolls Preserved in the Public Record Office. Vol. 1, Edward I, A.D. 1272–1307. London: HM Stationery Office. IA calendaroffinero01lond.
  ——, ed. (1912a). Calendar of Various Chancery Rolls: Supplementary Close rolls, Welsh Rolls, Scutage Rolls: A. D. 1277 – 1326. London: HM Stationery Office. IA cu31924026113880.
  ——, ed. (1912b). Calendar of the Fine Rolls Preserved in the Public Record Office. Vol. 2, Edward II, A.D. 1307–1319. London: HM Stationery Office. IA calendaroffinero02lond.
  ——, ed. (1916). Calendar of Inquisitions Miscellaneous (Chancery). Vol. 2, A.D. 1307–1349. London: HM Stationery Office.
- Palgrave, Francis, ed. (1827–1834). The Parliamentary Writs and Writs of Military Summons. Vol. II. London: Record Commission.
- Powel, David (1584). The Historie of Cambria, now called Wales. London.
- Public Record Office (1927). Calendar of Chancery Warrants Preserved in the Public Record Office, A.D. 1244–1326. London: HM Stationery Office.
- Rymer, Thomas, ed. (1816–1830). Foedera, Conventiones, Litterae (in Latin). Vol. II (Record Commission ed.). London.
- Sharp, J. E. E. S.; Stamp, A. E., eds. (1908). Calendar of Inquisitions Post Mortem and Other Analogous Documents Preserved in the Public Record Office. Vol. 5, Edward II. London: HM Stationery Office. IA cu31924011387838.
  ——; Stamp, A. E., eds. (1912). Calendar of Inquisitions Post Mortem and Other Analogous Documents Preserved in the Public Record Office. Vol. 3, Edward I. London: HM Stationery Office. IA calendarofinquis03lond.
- Stamp, A. E.; Salisbury, E.; Atkinson, E. G.; O'Reilly, J. J., eds. (1921). Calendar of Inquisitions Post Mortem and Other Analogous Documents Preserved in the Public Record Office. Vol. 10, Edward III. London: HM Stationery Office.
- Strachey, John, ed. (1767–1777). Rotuli Parliamentorum (in Latin). London.

=== Secondary sources ===
- Bartrum, P. C. (1973–1974). "Rhandiroedd Powys". National Library of Wales Journal (in Welsh). 18: 13–14.
- Bridgeman, G. T. O. (1868). "The Princes of Upper Powys". Montgomeryshire Collections. 1: 1–194.
- Carr, A. D. (1970). "An Aristocracy in Decline: The Native Welsh Lords after the Edwardian Conquest". Welsh History Review. 5. Cardiff: University of Wales Press: 103–129.
- Davies, J. C. (1918). The Baronial Opposition to Edward II: Its Character and Policy. Cambridge: Cambridge University Press.
  Davies, R. R. (1978). Lordship and Society in the March of Wales, 1282–1400. Oxford: Clarendon Press.
- Eyton, R. W. (1853–1860). Antiquities of Shropshire. Vol. IX. London.
- Fletcher, W. G. D. (1905). "Shropshire Men at the French Wars of 1346–7". Transactions of the Shropshire Archaeological and Natural History Society. 5.
- Jones, M. C. (1868). "The Feudal Barons of Powys". Montgomeryshire Collections. 1: 257–423.
- Maddicott, J. R. (1970). Thomas of Lancaster, 1307–1322: A Study in the Reign of Edward II. Oxford: Oxford University Press.
- Morgan, Richard (1980). "The Barony of Powys, 1275–1360". Welsh History Review. 10. Cardiff: University of Wales Press: 1–42.
- Owen, Hugh; Blakeway, John Brickdale (1825). A History of Shrewsbury. Vol. II. London.
- Peel, A. M. (1949–1950). "Charltons of Apley Castle". Transactions of the Shropshire Archaeological Society. 53.
- Phillips, J. R. S. (1972). Aymer de Valence, Earl of Pembroke, 1307–1324: Baronial Politics in the Reign of Edward II. Oxford: Clarendon Press.
- Pierce, T. Jones (1959). "HAWYS GADARN (1291–before 1353), heiress". Dictionary of Welsh Biography. Aberystwyth: National Library of Wales.
