= John Charlton, 1st Baron Charlton =

English nobleman (died 1353)

John Charlton
- A stained glass window depicting John Charlton in the Church of St Mary the Virgin, Shrewsbury.
- Successor: John Charlton
- Born: 1268
- Died: 1353 (aged 84/85)
- Spouse: Hawys Gadarn
- Issue: John Charlton; Isabella Sutton

Traditional Coat of Arms of the de la Pole and de Cherleton families. Or, a lion Gules armed and langued Azure.

John Charlton (also Charleton, Cherleton or Chorleton), 1st Baron Charlton of Powys (1268–1353) came from a family of minor landowners near Wellington, Shropshire. He was the son of Robert Charlton (and elder brother to Alan, and Thomas, Bishop of Hereford) of Apley castle near Wrockwardine.

He had entered the service of the crown as a page, and when Prince Edward became king, Charlton remained in the royal household. He was recorded as a king's yeoman on 18 September 1307 and was styled as a knight shortly afterwards. In January 1308 he accompanied the king to France for his wedding, and in 1309 served in Ireland. He held the post of Chamberlain in the Royal Household before 1314, although the importance of the post is unclear.

On 26 July 1309 he married Hawys Gadarn (the Hardy), heiress of the Lordship of Powys from her father the last Prince of Powys Owen de la Pole. Charlton acquired Pole castle (today's Welshpool) on his marriage, and from 1310 to 1315 he built the basis of the present Powis Castle. Strengthening the English authority over his Welsh lands, in 1310 he and Hawise's uncle Griffin de la Pole raised 400 footsoldiers from the lordship of Powis to fight against the Scots.

King Edward summoned him to Parliament as the 1st Lord Charlton on 26 July 1313, a title partly acquired through the inherited right of his wife Hawise to Powys, which explains the common informal addition to his title of "Lord of Powis", "dominus de Powis" or "seigneur de Powis".

John Charlton's authority in Powys grew too much for Hawise's uncle Griffin, who was aided in his opposition by the Le Strange lords of Knockin, Shropshire.

By 1314, John was governor of Builth castle, with a constabulary role over the Welsh which included opposing Welsh rebels in 1316. In 1317 he raised another 300-foot soldiers for the king, and in 1319 raised a further 500 soldiers for service against the Scots.

John had taken action against Hawise's uncle Griffin by 1320, finally recovering all of his wife's estates, as well as having the lands of her four uncles settled on her, in default of their male issue.

Following the confiscation of the Gower Lordship from the de Braose family in breach of Marcher autonomy by King Edward and its gift to his favourite Hugh Despenser the Younger, in 1321 John Charlton joined in the baronial rebellion of Thomas, Earl of Lancaster against the Despenser family and the King. On 11 September 1322, he was very quickly pardoned for his part in the rebellion having returned to the King's side, raising another 500 men for him in 1325.

John Charlton's authority on the Welsh border was threatened by The Earl of Arundel who became Justice of Wales in 1322, and Warden of the Welsh Marches in 1325, establishing his base as Constable of Montgomery Castle. In the autumn of 1326, Charlton's former ally Roger Mortimer (whose daughter Maud was married to Charlton's son John), and Queen Isabella took action against the Despenser family and other unpopular advisers to King Edward. Arundel remained loyal to the king, which gave Charlton the opportunity to rid himself of his rival by arresting and executing him (at Shrewsbury or, possibly, Hereford) under the orders of the Queen.

Thomas Charlton, Bishop of Hereford who was Lord Privy Seal from 1316 to 1320 was John's brother. On 29 June 1337, after King Edward III had taken power from Queen Isabella, John Charlton was appointed Chief Justiciar of Ireland and his brother Thomas became Lord Chancellor of Ireland. Within a year John had returned to England, following a dispute.

John Charlton split his last years between his properties at Apley Castle in Shropshire, Charlton Hall in Shrewsbury (the site now occupied by the old Theatre Royal) and Powis Castle in Mid-Wales. In his later life, he was a patron of Strata Marcella abbey, and was buried at the Franciscan Greyfriars Abbey in Shrewsbury, next to his wife, her father and grandfather. A fourteenth-century stained glass Jesse window, now in St Mary's church, Shrewsbury, but originally in the Greyfriars, shows at the bottom right-hand corner, a knight bearing the arms of Powys who is probably Charlton.

He was succeeded by his son John Charleton, 2nd Baron Cherleton. A daughter, Isabella, married John Sutton II. Their descendant Edmund Sutton would marry Joyce Tiptoft, daughter of Joyce de Cherleton, co-heiress of Edward Charleton, 5th Baron Cherleton, last to hold the title Baron Cherleton.

Peerage of England
Preceded by New Creation	Baron Cherleton; 1313–1353	Succeeded by John Charleton
