= Baron Davies (disambiguation) =

Baron Davies is a hereditary peerage created in 1932.

- David Davies, 1st Baron Davies (1880−1944), Welsh politician and philanthropist
- David Davies, 3rd Baron Davies (1940−2024), Welsh peer

Baron Davies may also refer to:

- Mervyn Davies, Baron Davies of Abersoch (born 1952), British banker and government minister
- Bryn Davies, Baron Davies of Brixton (born 1944), British trade unionist, actuary and politician
- Garfield Davies, Baron Davies of Coity (1935−2019), British trade union leader
- Byron Davies, Baron Davies of Gower (born 1952), British politician
- Harold Davies, Baron Davies of Leek (1904−1985), British Labour politician
- Bryan Davies, Baron Davies of Oldham (born 1939), British government leader
- Elfed Davies, Baron Davies of Penrhys (1913−1992), Welsh Labour politician
- Quentin Davies, Baron Davies of Stamford (born 1944), British Labour politician
- Edmund Davies, Baron Edmund-Davies (1906–1992), British judge
- Baron Harding-Davies, the title that was to be created for John Davies
- Richard Llewelyn-Davies, Baron Llewelyn-Davies (1912–1981), British architect

== See also ==
- Stanley Clinton-Davis, Baron Clinton-Davis (1928–2023), British solicitor and Labour peer
- Baron Davis (born 1979), American basketball player
- Pat Llewelyn-Davies, Baroness Llewelyn-Davies of Hastoe (1915–1997), British Labour peer
