= Humphrey Lloyd =

Humphrey Lloyd may refer to:

- Humphrey Llwyd (1527–1568), Welsh cartographer, author, antiquary and Member of Parliament
- Humphrey Lloyd (by 1498–1562 or later), Member of Parliament for Montgomeryshire
- Humphrey Lloyd (physicist) (1800–1881), provost of Trinity College, Dublin, 1867–1881
- Humphrey Lloyd (bishop) (1610–1689), Bishop of Bangor, 1674–1689

== See also ==
- Mount Humphrey Lloyd, a mountain in Victoria Land, Antarctica, named for the provost of Trinity College
