= King Edward VII Welsh National Memorial Association =

Welsh voluntary association

The King Edward VII Welsh National Memorial Association or WNMA was a Welsh voluntary association set up to combat tuberculosis.

The lord mayor of Cardiff, alderman John Chappell, convened a meeting in Shrewsbury on 30 September 1910 to decide what form the Welsh national memorial to King Edward VII should take. The meeting decided that the memorial should be an organised campaign to eradicate tuberculosis in Wales and Monmouthshire. £300,000 was raised by the public, half of which was donated by philanthropist David Davies of Llandinam, the Liberal MP for Montgomeryshire, who had a special interest in the fight against tuberculosis. He later became the first president of the WNMA, which was incorporated on 17 May 1912. He invited Thomas Jones, a lifelong friend and guide, to be the WNMA's first secretary. The Public Health (Tuberculosis) Act 1921 required local authorities to treat and prevent tuberculosis. However, in Wales the WNMA already existed. The Act gave them statutory responsibility for fighting tuberculosis in Wales.
