= Rhys and Meinir =

Welsh folklore tale

The legend of Rhys and Meinir is a Welsh folklore tale of the tragic lovers Rhys Maredudd and Meinir. It takes place in 1750 in the village of Nant Gwrtheyrn in the Llŷn Peninsula, Gwynedd.

== The legend ==
Rhys Maredudd, of Tŷ Uchaf farm, and Meinir, in some sources his cousin, were childhood sweethearts who grew up together in the Nant Gwrtheyrn valley. They would often play together on the slopes of the nearby Yr Eifl, and in particular under a certain hollow oak tree.

When they grew up, they became engaged to be married. In Nant Gwrtheyrn at that time, there was a tradition known as the ‘Wedding Quest’, where the bride would hide and the groom would seek her out before their wedding ceremony began. On the morning of their wedding in the church at Clynnog Fawr, in accordance with this tradition, Meinir disappeared to hide. However, Rhys was unable to find her – and even when the rest of their family and friends joined in the search, they had no luck. Rhys continued his search for Meinir over the following years, but to no avail.

One night, when he was out on the slopes of Yr Eifl, a storm blew in and he sheltered under the hollow oak tree that they had played under as children together. Lightning struck the oak tree, and it split open to reveal Meinir’s skeleton inside, still in her wedding dress. Rhys could not take the sight, and died of a broken heart.

Since their deaths, tales of supernatural phenomena have arisen around Nant Gwrtheyrn: it is said that no bird will ever land on the lightning-struck oak, apart from owls and cormorants. Visitors to Nant Gwrtheyrn have also claimed to see the ghosts of Rhys and Meinir walk hand-in-hand on the beach at night.

== Legacy ==
The Caffi Meinir cafe at Nant Gwrtheyrn Welsh Language and Heritage Centre takes its name from Meinir. The centre also has an oak tree trunk sculpture by Sebastien Boyesen that displays the legend.

The 1987 Welsh-language musical Rhys a Meinir by Robin Lwyd ab Owain follows the story of Rhys and Meinir’s lives. In 2017, the Welsh musician Cian Ciaran released the album Rhys a Meinir, also inspired by the story.

The story also features in several compilations of Welsh folklore, such as Russ Williams’s ‘Where the Folk; a Welsh Folklore Road Trip’ and Peter Stevenson’s ‘Illustrated Welsh Folk Tales for Young and Old’.
