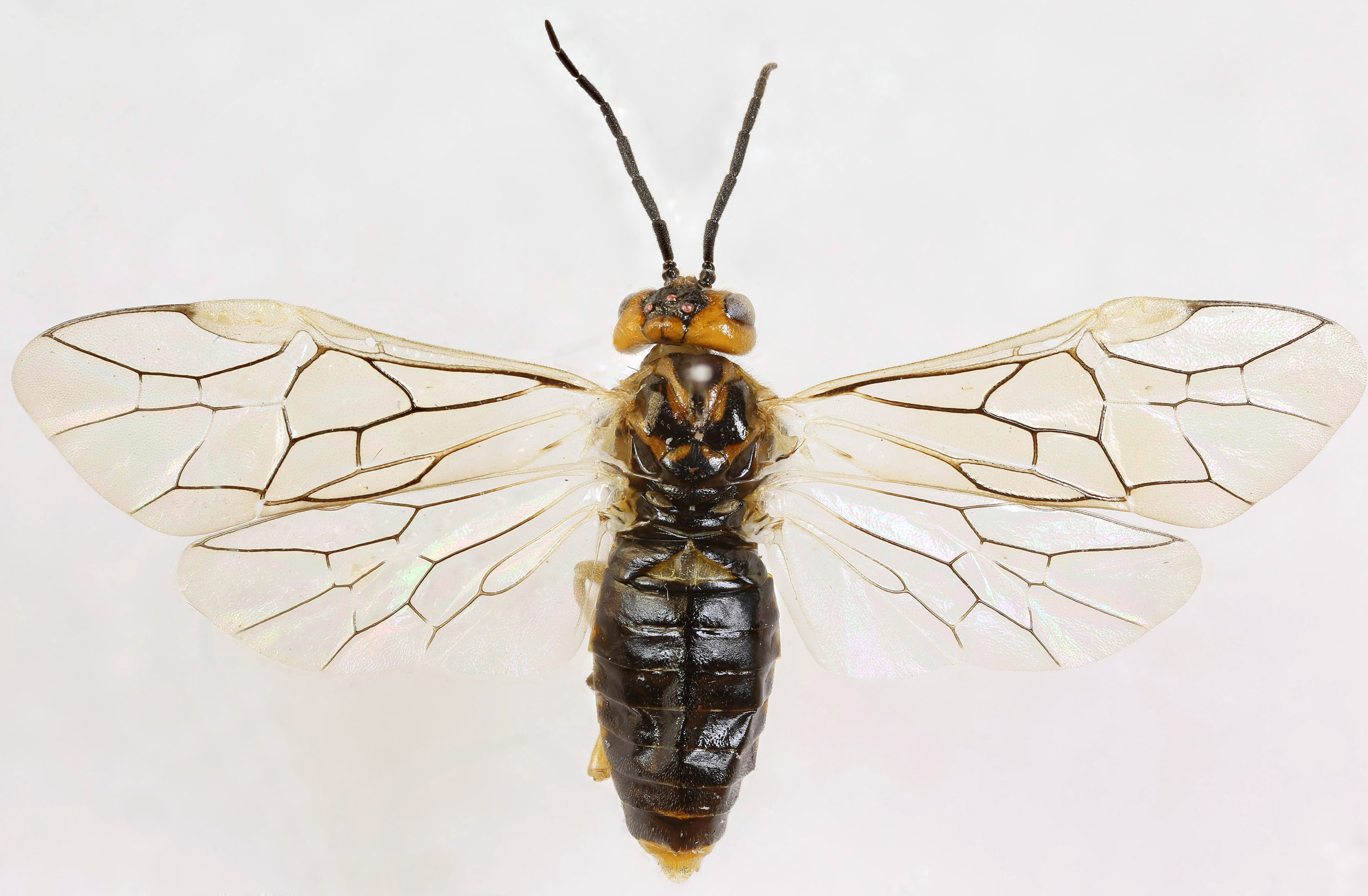
- Pachynematus clitellatus female, Nant Gwrtheyrn, North Wales,

Scientific classification
- Domain: Eukaryota
- Kingdom: Animalia
- Phylum: Arthropoda
- Class: Insecta
- Order: Hymenoptera
- Suborder: Symphyta
- Family: Tenthredinidae
- Genus: Pachynematus
- Species: P. clitellatus

Binomial name
- Pachynematus clitellatus (Audinet-Serville, 1823)

= Pachynematus clitellatus =

Species of sawfly

Pachynematus clitellatus is a Palearctic species of sawfly.
