= Hugh Pryce =

Welsh politician

Hugh Pryce was a Welsh politician who sat in the House of Commons in 1656. He fought in the Parliamentary army in the English Civil War.

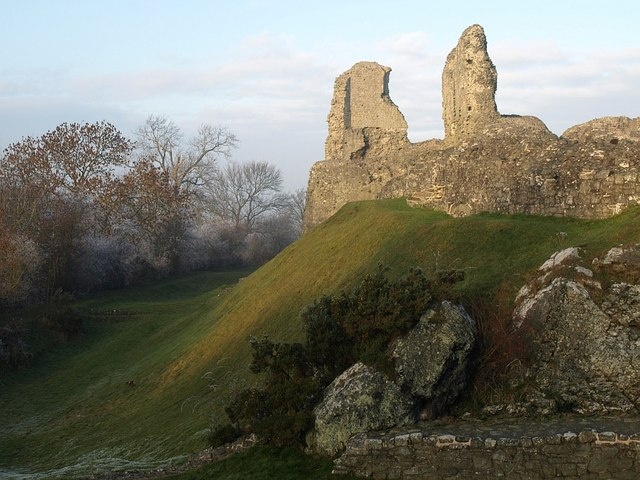
Ruins of Montgomery Castle

Pryce was the son of Edward Pryce of Kerry, Powys. He was a colonel in the Parliamentary army. He was appointed Governor of Redcastle, after its capture in September 1644, and was ordered by the Committee of both Houses to continue in post on 17 June 1647. In 1649 he was one of the county committee for the Advance of Money for Montgomeryshire and was one of those appointed to "demolish totally" Montgomery Castle on 15 June 1649. He was appointed a commissioner for sequestration for North Wales on 18 February 1650. In 1654 he was High Sheriff of Montgomeryshire. He was a J. P. for Montgomeryshire in 1655. In 1656, he was elected Member of Parliament for Montgomeryshire.

Parliament of England
Preceded by Charles Lloyd; John Pryce	Member of Parliament for Montgomeryshire; 1656; With: Charles Lloyd	Succeeded by Edward Vaughan
