= Royal Montgomeryshire Militia =

Auxiliary unit of the British Army

Royal Montgomeryshire Militia Royal Montgomeryshire Rifles 4th (Royal Montgomeryshire Militia) Battalion, South Wales Borderers
- Active: 1662–1 April 1908
- Country: England (1662–1707); Kingdom of Great Britain (1707–1800); United Kingdom (1801–1908)
- Branch: Militia/Special Reserve
- Role: Infantry
- Size: 1 Battalion
- Garrison/HQ: Welshpool

The Montgomeryshire Militia, later the Royal Montgomeryshire Rifles, was an auxiliary (Note: It is incorrect to describe the British Militia as 'irregular': throughout their history they were equipped and trained exactly like the line regiments of the regular army, and once embodied in time of war they were fulltime professional soldiers for the duration of their enlistment.) regiment reorganised in the Welsh county of Montgomeryshire during the 18th Century from earlier precursor units. Primarily intended for home defence, it served in Great Britain and Ireland during Britain's major wars. It later became part of the South Wales Borderers until it was disbanded in 1908.

== Montgomeryshire Trained Bands ==
The universal obligation to military service in the Shire levy was long established in England and extended to Wales, and its legal basis was updated by two acts of 1557 (4 & 5 Ph. & M. cc. 2 and 3), which placed selected men, the 'trained bands', under the command of county Lords Lieutenant appointed by the monarch. This is seen as the starting date for the organised Militia of England and Wales.

During the Armada crisis of 1588, Montgomeryshire furnished 300 trained and 300 untrained foot, together with 50 horse (1 lance (heavy cavalry), 19 light horse and 30 'petronel's (the petronel was an early cavalry firearm)). In the 16th Century little distinction was made between the militia and the troops levied by the counties for overseas expeditions. However, the counties usually conscripted the unemployed and criminals rather than send the Trained Bandsmen. Between 1585 and 1602 Montgomeryshire supplied 621 men for service in Ireland, and a further 75 for France. The men were given three days' 'conduct money' to get to Chester, the main port of embarkation for Ireland. Conduct money was recovered from the government, but replacing the weapons issued to the levies from the militia armouries was a heavy cost on the counties.

With the passing of the threat of invasion, the trained bands declined in the early 17th Century. Later, King Charles I attempted to reform them into a national force or 'Perfect Militia' answering to the king rather than local control. In 1638 the Montgomery Trained Band consisted of 150 musketeers and 150 pikemen, with 50 men in the Montgomery Trained Band Horse. In 1640 the county was ordered to send a detachment of 200 men to Newcastle upon Tyne to take part in the Second Bishops' War.

Control of the militia was one of the areas of dispute between Charles I and Parliament that led to the English Civil War. When open war broke out between the King and Parliament, neither side made much use of the trained bands beyond securing the county armouries for their own full-time troops. Most of Wales was under Royalist control for much of the war, and was a recruiting ground for the King's armies until Parliament captured Montgomery Castle in September 1644.

== Montgomeryshire Militia ==
After the Restoration of the Monarchy, the Militia was re-established by the Militia Act 1661 under the control of the king's lords lieutenant, the men to be selected by ballot. This was popularly seen as the 'Constitutional Force' to counterbalance a 'Standing Army' tainted by association with the New Model Army that had supported Cromwell's military dictatorship.

In Montgomeryshire there was a reluctance to muster and some refusals to pay the high levy to replace worn-out weapons with new ones sourced from a great distance away from the remote county. The militia forces in the Welsh counties were small, and were grouped together under the command of the Lord President of the Council of Wales. As Lord President, the Duke of Beaufort carried out a tour of inspection of the Welsh militia in 1684. On entering Montgomeryshire on 19 July he was met by a Troop of mounted militia, and then inspected the four companies of foot militia near Welshpool.

In 1697 the county had 364 men under the command of Colonel Sir John Pryce, 3rd Baronet and 56 horse under Captain Mathew Price. (Note: Possibly Matthew Pryce of Park, Llanwnog, former MP for Montgomery Boroughs)

Generally the militia declined in the long peace after the Treaty of Utrecht in 1713. Jacobites were numerous amongst the Welsh Militia, but they did not show their hands during the Risings of 1715 and 1745, and bloodshed was avoided.

== 1757 reforms ==
Under threat of French invasion during the Seven Years' War a series of Militia Acts from 1757 re-established county militia regiments, the men being conscripted by means of parish ballots (paid substitutes were permitted) to serve for three years. There was a property qualification for officers, who were commissioned by the lord lieutenant. An adjutant and drill sergeants were to be provided to each regiment from the Regular Army, and arms and accoutrements would be supplied when the county had secured 60 per cent of its quota of recruits.

Montgomeryshire was given a quota of 240 men to raise, but failed to do so. Major-General the Earl of Cholmondeley was Lord Lieutenant of Montgomeryshire and several other counties, but found that he was unable to raise militia in any of his Welsh counties other than Flintshire. The problem was less with the other ranks raised by ballot than the shortage of men qualified to be officers, even after the requirements were lowered for Welsh counties. Cholmondeley was replaced as lord lieutenant by the 1st Earl of Powis in 1761 and the Montgomeryshire Militia was finally raised on 11 May 1763 (the date its weapons were issued from the Tower of London) at Welshpool under the command of Sir John Powell Pryce, 6th Baronet. It was organised into three companies, each 80 strong. By then the war had ended with the Treaty of Paris, so the new regiment was not actually embodied. The men mustered for a few days' training, then dispersed to their homes. Parliament did however provide the money to continue training the militia in peacetime (two periods of 14 days or one period of 28 days each year). The Montgomeryshire regiment periodically assembled, usually by companies at convenient locations, though the whole regiment was mustered for training in 1772, when it was commanded by Viscount Hereford.

=== War of American Independence ===
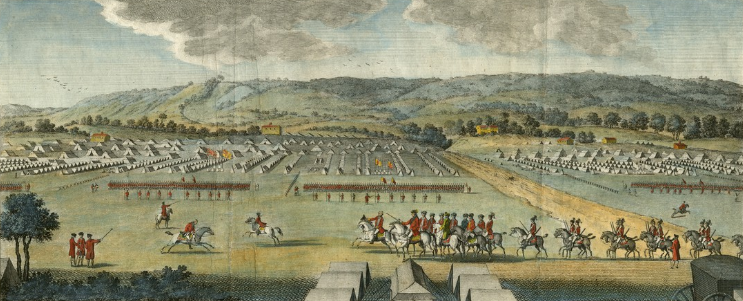
A review at Coxheath Camp.

The militia were called out in 1778 after the outbreak of the War of American Independence, when the country was threatened with invasion by the Americans' allies, France and Spain. The Montgomeryshire Militia were 'embodied' for permanent duty for the first time on 31 March 1778 at Welshpool. Viscount Hereford resigned the command and the 2nd Earl of Powis was appointed colonel in June. He obtained permission to 'augment' the regiment by an additional 80 men and from four to five companies (one of which now or later was a light company), though still smaller than an average regiment. The county quota was not increased so these men must have been obtained by voluntary enlistment rather than by ballot.

The Montgomeryshire Militia marched out of Welshpool on 8 June bound for the invasion-threatened county of Kent. It was stationed at Coxheath Camp near Maidstone, which was the army's largest training camp. Here the completely raw militia were exercised as part of a division alongside regular troops while providing a reserve in case of French invasion of South East England. As an understrength unit the Montgomery Militia was attached to the artillery park with two other small Welsh regiments. On 6 November the regiment left the tented camp and moved into winter quarters in Maidstone.

On 1 June 1779 the regiment began marching out to that summer's camp on the coast at Fairlight Down on the Sussex coast. It spent the winter in quarters at Ashford and Wye in Kent, where in January and April 1780 it received parties of recruits sent from Mellington and Welshpool in Montgomeryshire. From 8 June to 28 October the regiment was in camp at Dartford. Eight officers and 10 other ranks claimed leave to go home to vote in the 1780 general election Then the whole regiment was ordered back to Montgomeryshire, arriving at Bishop's Castle on 2 November and taking up quarters at Montgomery, Welshpool and Newtown.

While the regiment was in its home county the Earl of Powis attempted to augment it by an additional company raised by voluntary enlistment. But the legislation to allow this was unclear, and in April 1781 the War Office refused Powis permission to raise the company. The regiment marched back to Kent in June 1781, spending the summer at Lenham Heath Camp between Maidstone and Ashford. This year an inspecting general found that 220 of the muskets issued to the regiment in 1775 were unfit for service. The Montgomeryshires spent the winter of 1781–2 quartered in Croydon, Surrey, and Bromley, Kent. They returned to Coxheath Camp for the summer of 1782, then wintered in Dartford, with the Light Company detached to Maidstone. The Peace of Paris ended the war in 1783, and in February the regiment was sent home to Montgomeryshire to be disembodied.

In its disembodied state the regimental headquarters (HQ) and armoury in Welshpool were manned by the permanent staff of sergeants, corporals and drummers under the adjutant and sergeant-major. All the arms other than those of the permanent staff were returned to the Tower of London. From 1784 to 1792 the militia were assembled for their 28 days' annual peacetime training, but to save money only two-thirds of the men were actually mustered each year. The whole of the Montgomeryshire Militia were mustered for annual training in the spring of 1787

=== French Revolutionary War ===
Revolutionary France declared war on Britain on 1 February 1793 and the Montgomeryshire Militia were embodied next day. However, under pressure of mobilisation the Tower of London could not supply any weapons, and apart from the permanent staff the regiment was unarmed when it was sent to Bridgnorth on 26 March. On 15 April it was ordered to stand by to go to Birmingham to act in aid of the civil power, but was clearly unable to carry out the duty. Finally, in late May it was marched to Cirencester where the weapons and stores were delivered. On 15 July it moved to Taunton, which remained its station until the following year, apart from a brief deployment to Exeter in October, and being billeted at Langport and Somerton in November to allow a unit of Yorkshire Militia to use the quarters while passing through Taunton.

The militia were augmented by Act of Parliament in 1794 and the Montgomeryshires were increased by two companies (145 men), the first on 8 April 1794 and the second on 13 February 1795. These were filled by voluntary enlistment rather than by the ballot, the bounty money for the volunteers being raised by patriotic subscriptions within the county.

The French Revolutionary War and Napoleonic Wars saw a new phase for the English militia: they were embodied for a whole generation, and became regiments of full-time professional soldiers (though restricted to service in the British Isles), which the Regular Army increasingly saw as a prime source of recruits. They served in coast defences, manning garrisons, guarding prisoners of war, and for internal security, while their traditional local defence duties were taken over by the Volunteers and mounted Yeomanry.

The Montgomeryshire Militia left Taunton on 31 March 1794 and moved to Devizes. Then on 12 May the regiment was marched across southern England to Folkestone Camp for the summer. On 31 October they went into temporary quarters across a number of villages in Kent before going to their winter quarters at Maidstone. By now the regiment was equipped with light 'battalion guns', but these remained behind when it moved into its summer camp at Eastbourne in April 1795; it later moved to Brighton in Sussex. In October it went into winter quarters at Botley Barracks, Hampshire. In June 1796 it was moved to Kent, first at Canterbury Barracks, then quartered at Ashford Barracks for the winter.

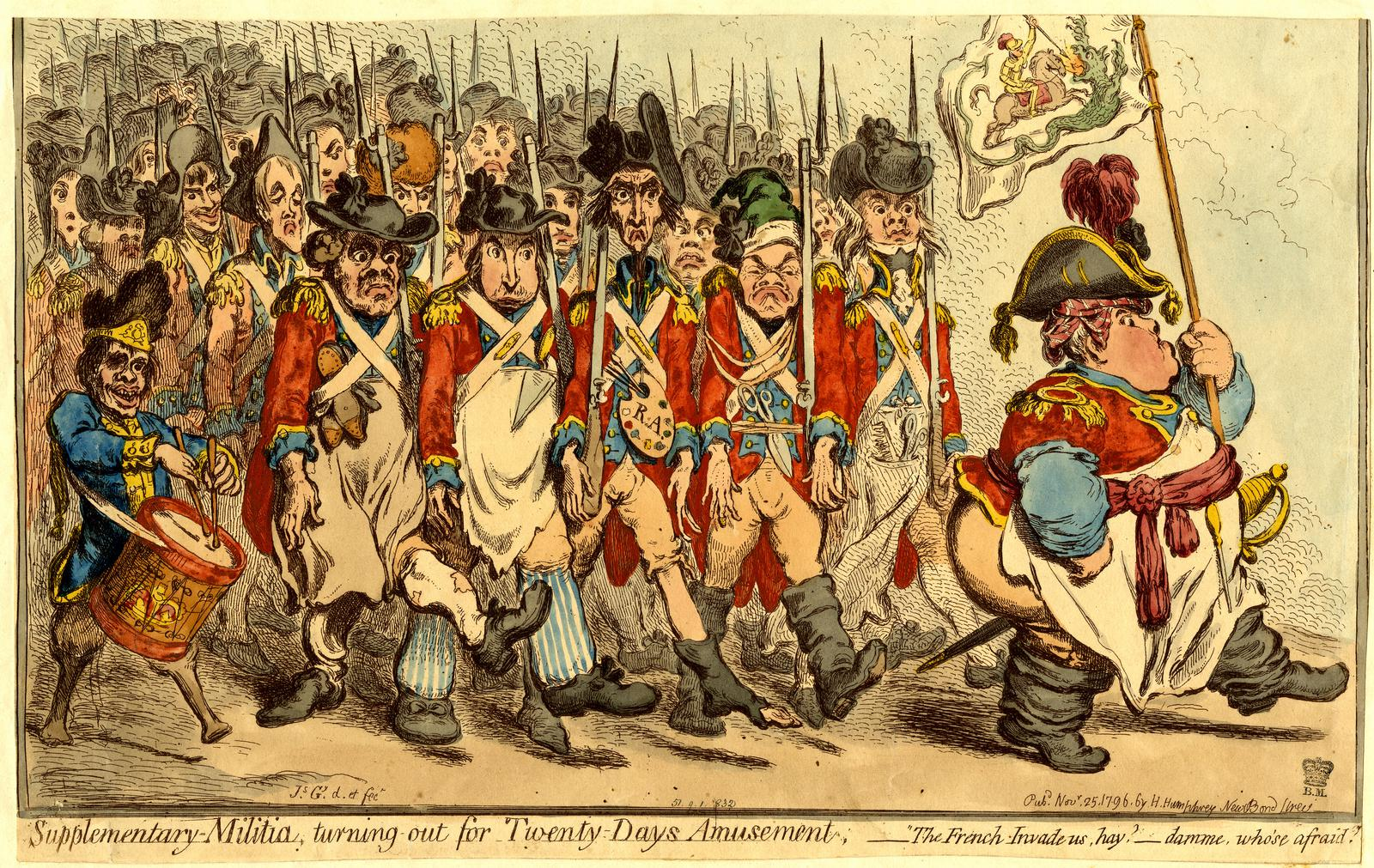
Supplementary-Militia, turning-out for Twenty Days Amusement: 1796 caricature by James Gillray.

In a fresh attempt to have as many men as possible under arms for home defence in order to release regulars, the Government created the Supplementary Militia, a compulsory levy of men to be trained in their spare time, and to be incorporated in the Militia as required. Montgomeryshire's additional quota was fixed at 259 men, bringing the establishment of its regiment up to 499. On 19 December 1796 a detachment of the regiment set out from Ashford to Welshpool to train the supplementaries. In August 1797 the regiment was serving in the Dover Garrison (providing large working parties for the modernisation of the defences) and in the autumn it was manning the Dungeness forts. Early in 1798 the regiment moved to Tunbridge Wells, where it was joined by the first detachment of its embodied Supplementary Militia. The second half joined at the end of May, when the regiment had moved to Horsham. By now many of the men who had been embodied in 1793 were due to complete their five-year term of service. The ballot was rigorously enforced in Montgomeryshire to keep up the numbers. By June regimental strength, including the supplementaries, was 33 sergeants and 642 other ranks. The Earl of Powis resigned as colonel on 5 May, and Lt-Col Thomas Browne of Mellington was promoted to succeed him.

In the summer of 1798 the Irish Rebellion became serious, and the French were sending help to the rebels. The Montgomery was among the militia regiments that volunteered to serve in Ireland and once the necessary legislation was passed by parliament (the Militia (No. 4) Act 1798) it was one of 13 regiments whose offer was accepted. It served there under Col Browne

By February 1799 the regiment was stationed at Chichester in Sussex, with the Grenadier Company detached to Canterbury. On 15 April it marched north to Liverpool, being joined by the grenadiers on the way. The invasion threat had subsided, and on 29 November the regiment's supplementaries were marched home to Welshpool to be paid off. The regiment marched from Liverpool on 26 June to Whitehaven, Cumberland, which was to be its station for the next year. By the end of 1800, with the departure of the supplementaries and transfers to the regular army (the Montgomeryshires supplied 268 volunteers between July 1799 and the end of 1800), the regiment was only 209 strong. On 2 September 1801 the four understrength companies marched from Whitehaven to Ipswich, being joined by a batch of newly balloted men. By November it was at Yarmouth, from where it marched to Coventry for the winter.

The Treaty of Amiens was signed on 25 March and most of the militia was immediately stood down. The Montgomeryshires marched out of Coventry on 31 March and were disembodied at Welshpool on 12 April, leaving a permanent staff of nine sergeants, nine corporals and four drummers under the adjutant at regimental HQ at Poole Middle. The disembodied regimental strength was set at 279 men in four companies, and was kept up by use of the ballot.

=== Napoleonic Wars ===
The Peace of Amiens was short-lived and war was resumed in May 1803. The regiment was embodied and marched on 17 May under Col Browne to Plymouth. Its establishment was increased from four to six companies (24 officers, 54 non-commissioned officers and drummers, 418 privates) and 139 supplementary militiamen were embodied at Welshpool and marched to join the regiment in June. At Plymouth the regiment shared the sentry duties at the Royal Navy establishments and guarding Mill Prison, which housed prisoners of war; the men of the battalion guns were seconded to do duty with the Royal Artillery (RA). Early in 1804 the regiment crossed the River Tamar to Maker Camp to assist the RA manning the forts covering Plymouth, with a detachment at the Yealm Batteries on the eastern side. In February 1805 the main body of the regiment was in Plymouth, but there were still detachments at Maker and Yealm. In April, 92 men volunteered to transfer to the Regulars and the supplementaries were stood down in June, when the regiment reverted to four companies. During the summer of 1805, when Napoleon was massing his 'Army of England' at Boulogne for a projected invasion, the regiment was still part of the Plymouth garrison. Its 308 men under Maj John Davies were deployed with 3 companies in Plymouth Dock Barracks and 1 company at Pendennis Castle and Berry Head. The Royal Navy's victory at Trafalgar in October 1805 reduced the likelihood of invasion, and the role of the militia changed, with less emphasis on coast defence and more as a reserve for the Regulars.

In April 1804 the regiment was one of 12 Welsh militia regiments awarded the prefix 'Royal'. Then in March 1810 it was one of four Welsh militia regiments converted to Light infantry, becoming the Royal Montgomeryshire Light Infantry Militia and adopting bugles in place of drums.

=== Ireland again ===
In April 1808 the Royal Montgomery moved to Chichester, and in 1809 they were quartered in Brighton, then at Hythe and Winchelsea. In the winter of 1810–11 it was at Dover, then at Brabourne Lees Barracks near Ashford. The Interchange Act 1811 allowed English militia regiments to serve in Ireland and vice versa for periods of two years In May Col Browne volunteered the Royal Montgomeryshires for this service, one of the first units to do so; all but seven men agreed to go. Colonel Browne died on 2 July, and Lt-Col John Davies of Nantcribba Hall took command. On 6 August the Royal Montgomery paraded to march to the point of embarkation, and they arrived at Cork on 25 August, as one of the first group of 13 militia regiments to serve there.

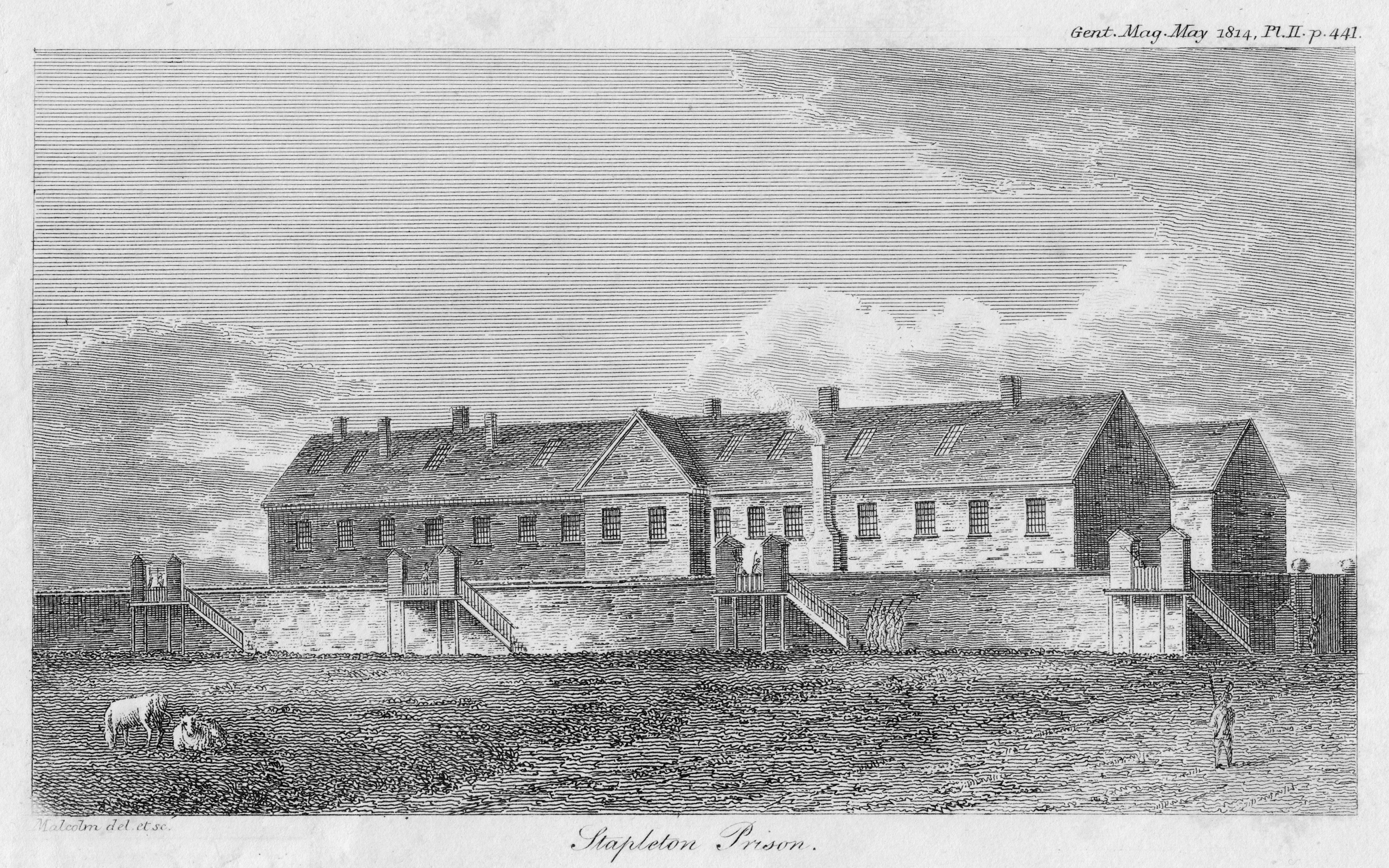
Stapleton Prison in 1814.

From Cork the regiment was sent to garrison Cahir, County Tipperary. Then on 1 October, leaving one company at Cahir, it moved to Clonmel. During its two years in Ireland, the regiment continued to supply numbers of volunteers to the regulars. On 15 June 1813 it left Clonmel and marched back to Cork for embarkation. Disembarking at Portsmouth on 4 July, it marched to Leicester arriving on 24 July. It stayed there until December, when it was sent to join the Bristol garrison, where the duties included guarding prisoners of war at Stapleton Prison and manning the Avon forts. The war ended in April 1814 and the regiment returned to Welshpool where it was disembodied on 24 June. It was not embodied during the short Waterloo Campaign in 1815.

=== Montgomeryshire Local Militia ===
While the Regular Militia were the mainstay of national defence during the Revolutionary and Napoleonic Wars, they were supplemented from 1808 by the Local Militia, which were part-time and only to be used within their own districts except in the event of invasion. These were raised to counter the declining numbers of Volunteers (which in Montgomeryshire had been organised in 1803 as a composite corps of cavalry and infantry, the Montgomeryshire Volunteer Legion). The Local Militia quota set for Montgomeryshire was 1674 (six times the Regular Militia quota) and two regiments were formed in November 1808:

- Eastern Montgomeryshire Local Militia at Welshpool, commanded by Lt-Col Viscount Clive (son of the Earl of Powis).
- Western Montgomeryshire Local Militia at Machynlleth, under Lt-Col Commandant John Edwards of Plas Machynlleth. Most of the officers and men came from the western companies of the Montgomeryshire Volunteer Legion and the militia ballot was not required to complete the regiment.

Both regiments carried out their 28 days' training early in 1809, the Eastern at Powis Castle Park, the Western at Plas Machynlleth. The training was subsequently reduced to 21 days, and then to 14 days in 1811. Large numbers of the ex-volunteers left in 1812 after their term of service, and had to be replaced by unwilling balloted men. Annual training was suspended in 1814, and the local militia ballot was suspended and the regiments disbanded in 1816 after the return of peace. The regiments' weapons were returned to store at Chester Castle.

=== Long peace ===
After Waterloo there was another long peace. Although officers continued to be commissioned into the militia and ballots were still held, the regiments were rarely assembled for training: the Royal Montgomeryshire trained in 1821, 1825 and 1831, then not again for over 20 years. The permanent staffs of sergeants and buglers (who were occasionally used to maintain public order) were progressively reduced from 1829. The regiment was still commanded by Lt-Col Davies until his death in 1842. Thereafter the appointment of Lt-Col Commandant remained in abeyance until the 2nd Earl of Powis (former commander of the Eastern Montgomeryshire Local Militia) took it up in December 1846. He too died in January 1848 and until 1852 the command was vacant: the senior officers were two captains, commissioned in 1805 and 1813 respectively.

== 1852 reforms ==
The Militia of the United Kingdom was revived by the Militia Act 1852, enacted during a period of international tension. As before, units were raised and administered on a county basis, and filled by voluntary enlistment (although conscription by means of the militia ballot might be used if the counties failed to meet their quotas). Training was for 56 days on enlistment, then for 21–28 days per year, during which the men received full army pay. Under the Act, militia units could be embodied by Royal Proclamation for full-time service in three circumstances:

1. 'On actual invasion, or imminent danger thereof' (added in 1854).
2. 'In all cases of invasion or upon imminent danger thereof'.
3. 'In all cases of rebellion or insurrection'.

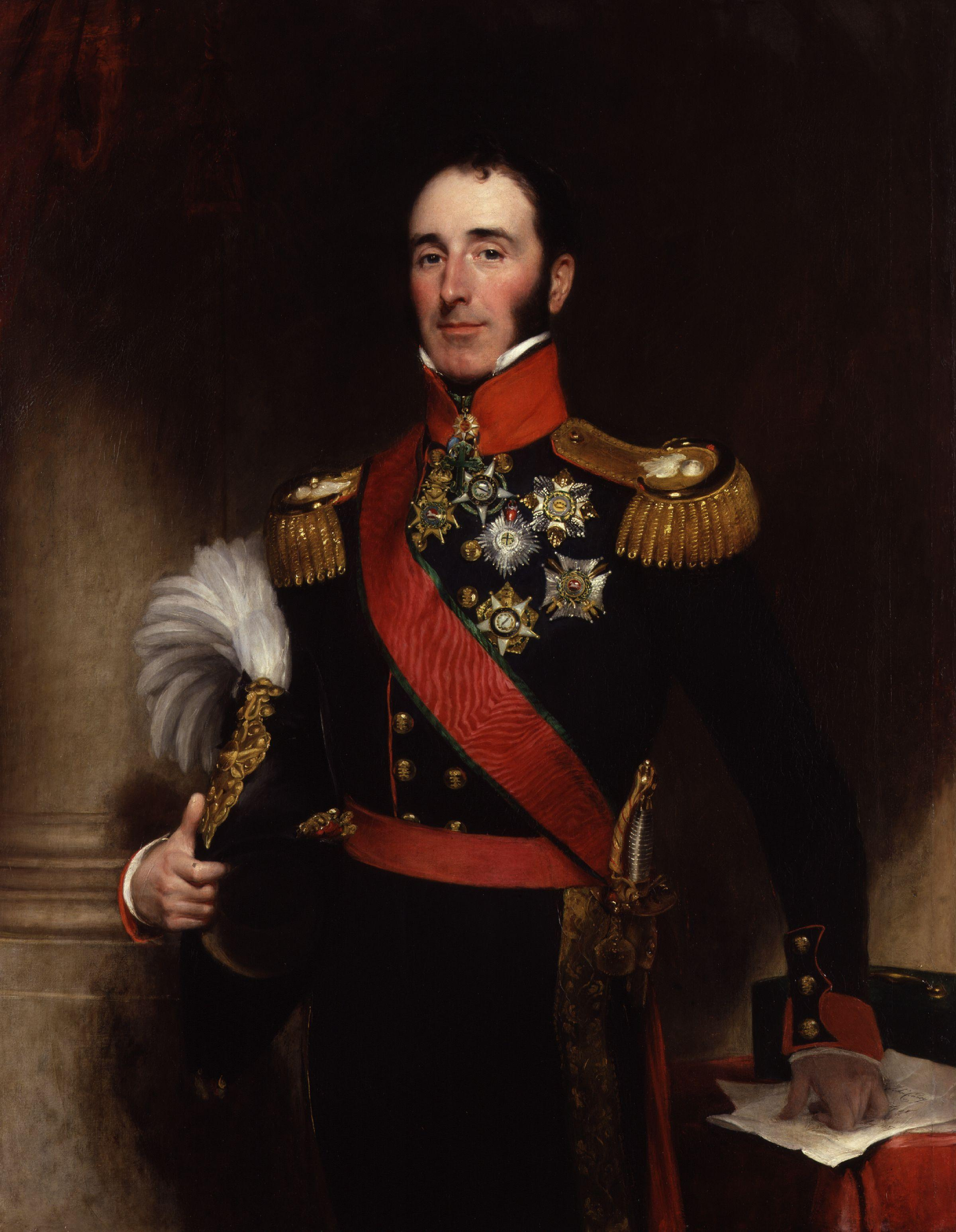
Sir John Conroy, who became the regimental lieutenant-colonel commandant in 1852

At this point the Royal Montgomeryshire had just seven officers, with no men to command, and a permanent staff consisting of the adjutant and one staff sergeant. On 30 August 1852 Sir John Conroy, the former comptroller of Queen Victoria's household, was appointed lieutenant-colonel commandant in the regiment, the seven elderly officers resigned and were replaced, and the adjutant and staff sergeant quickly began recruiting. Soon they had assembled three companies:

- No 1 (Welsh-pool)
- No 2 (Newtown)
- No 3 (Llanfair)

The regiment was the first in Wales (and the second in the whole of the UK) to be completed, and Conroy called it out for 20 days' training at Welshpool on 25 October. In March 1853 the regiment was redesignated as the Royal Montgomeryshire Rifles Militia, adopting Rifle green uniforms. Next month it completed a fourth company and on 26 April it assembled at Welshpool for 28 days' training, including the revised drill for a rifle regiment. Conroy died in 1854 and on 1 May 1854 the Hon Henry Hanbury-Tracy was promoted to Lt-Col Commandant with John Edward Harryman Pryce, formerly a captain in the 2nd Foot, as his major. The regiment began its annual training on 3 May, still armed with the old 'Brown Bess' smoothbore musket, which they fired on an 80 yards (73 m) range behind the armoury. The Crimean War had just broken out and the regiment volunteered for active service if required, but the offer was declined at the time.

=== Crimean War and after ===
After an expeditionary force was sent to the Crimea, the militia began to be called out for home defence. The Royal Montgomeryshire Rifles, 339 all ranks, were embodied at Welshpool on 12 December 1854 and were billeted in the town. The regiment was re-equipped with the Brunswick rifle before the end of the year. The change to the terms of embodiment in the 1854 Militia Act meant that the men enlisted before then were illegally embodied, and had to be offered release. Only 110 out of the 218 Montgomery men affected by this chose to re-engage and others had to be recruited to replace them and the 100 men who transferred to the regular army. On 25 June 1855 Maj Pryce succeeded Lt-Col Hanbury-Tracy, with Capt George Beadnell, formerly a lieutenant with the 37th Bengal Native Infantry, as his major.

On 11 February 1856 the regiment marched to Shrewsbury to entrain for Haverfordwest, where it began a period of garrison duty at Pembroke Dock. While forming part of the militia brigade in garrison, the regiment was involved in a serious riot when some of its men were attacked by men of the Royal Monmouthshire Militia. The riot was suppressed by the officers and duty piquets with drawn swords and fixed bayonets; afterwards no blame was attached to the Royal Montgomeryshire Rifles. The war having ended the regiment returned to Welshpool where it was disembodied on 19 June 1856.

Although a number of militia regiments were embodied again in 1857 to relieve regular troops for service against the Indian Mutiny, the number required was smaller, and the Royal Montgomeryshire Rifles were not called upon. Annual training for the regiment resumed in September 1858. It was re-equipped with a short pattern of the modern Enfield rifled musket in 1861, using a range at Llanymynech for live firing.

In 1861 the War Office ordered the amalgamation of the Montgomeryshire and Merionethshire militia quotas to form a larger regiment. The Royal Montgomeryshire Rifles were officially merged with the Royal Merioneth Rifles at Bala to form the Royal Montgomery & Merioneth Rifles Militia. However, the two contingents continued to operate separately and the merger was rescinded in 1867 when the regiments reverted to their previous titles.

The Militia Reserve introduced in 1867 consisted of present and former militiamen who undertook to serve overseas in case of war. In 1871 the regiment's short Enfield rifles were replaced with the new Snider–Enfield breechloader.

== Cardwell Reforms ==
Under the 'Localisation of the Forces' scheme introduced by the Cardwell Reforms of 1872, the militia were brigaded with their local Regular and Volunteer battalions on 1 April 1873. For the Royal Montgomeryshire Rifles and several other Welsh militia regiments this was in Brigade No 23 with the 1st and 2nd Battalions of the 23rd Foot (Royal Welch Fusiliers), based at Wrexham. However the following year the Royal Montgomeryshire Rifles moved to Brigade No 21 (Counties of Shropshire and Montgomery), grouped with the 43rd (Monmouthshire) Light Infantry, the 53rd (Shropshire) Regiment of Foot and the Shropshire Militia, together with Rifle Volunteers. A brigade depot was established at Copthorne Barracks, Shrewsbury, though the Royal Montgomeryshire Rifles remained at Welshpool for the rest of its existence.

The militia now came under the War Office rather than their county lords lieutenant and battalions had a large cadre of permanent staff (about 30). Around a third of the recruits and many young officers went on to join the Regular Army.

Following the Cardwell Reforms a mobilisation scheme began to appear in the Army List from December 1875. This assigned regular and militia units to places in an order of battle of corps, divisions and brigades for the 'Active Army', even though these formations were entirely theoretical, with no staff or services assigned. The Royal Montgomeryshire Rifles were assigned to 2nd Brigade of 3rd Division, VI Corps, alongside two regiments of Derbyshire Militia. The brigade would have mustered at Preston, Lancashire in time of war. In 1877 the establishment of the regiment was increased to six companies, with 600 rank and file.

On 23 April 1878 the militia reserve was called out during the period of international tension over the Russo-Turkish War. The contingent from the Royal Montgomeryshire Rifles was sent to Fort Regent on Jersey to train with the 53rd Foot. They returned to Welshpool to be stood down on 29 July.

== 4th Battalion, South Wales Borderers ==
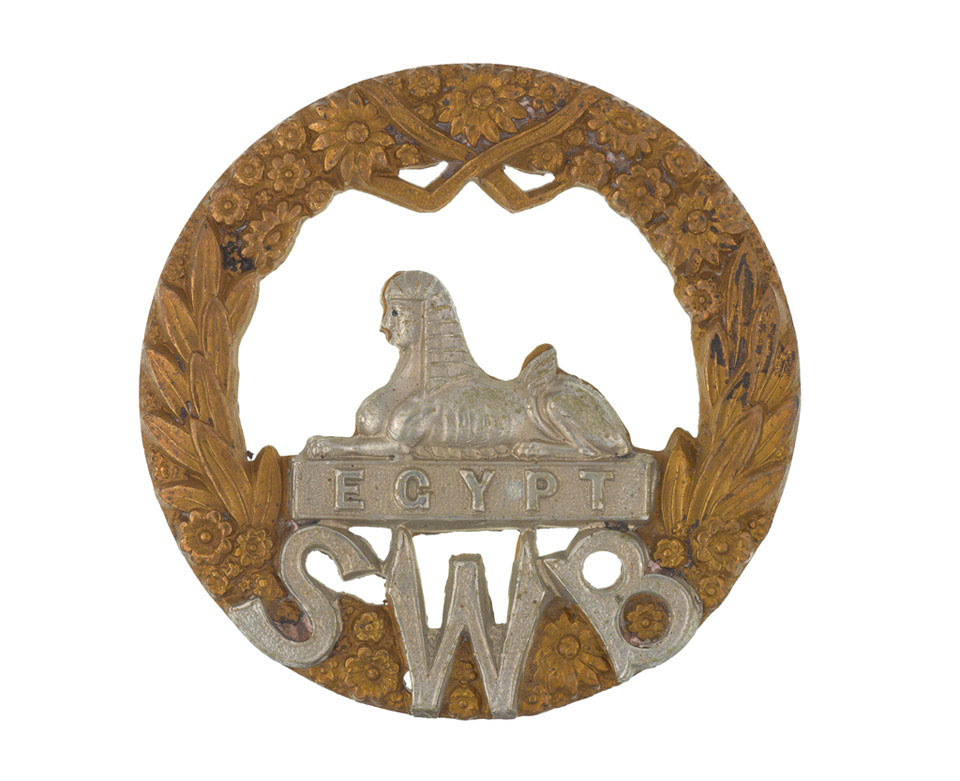
1896 cap badge of the South Wales Borderers

The Childers Reforms of 1881 took Cardwell's reforms further, with the militia formally joining their linked regiments. However, the grouping at Shrewsbury was broken up, the 43rd leaving and being replaced by the 85th Foot, which merged with the 53rd to form the King's Shropshire Light Infantry (KSLI) on 1 July 1881. On that date the Royal Montgomeryshire Rifles became the 4th Battalion of the KSLI, but almost immediately was transferred to the South Wales Borderers (SWB) as the 4th (Royal Montgomeryshire Militia) Battalion (losing their Rifles designation and distinctions, adopting the red uniform of the SWB). The battalion was re-equipped with the Martini-Henry rifle and opened a new range at Sylfaen in 1882.

=== Second Boer War ===
During the battalion's 1899 annual training, the situation in South Africa deteriorated and the battalion volunteered for overseas service, although the offer was declined. The Second Boer War began soon afterwards and after the disasters of Black Week in December most of the Regular Army was sent to South Africa. The battalion's militia reservists were called up to serve with the SWB. The rest of the 4th Bn SWB was embodied for garrison on 3 May 1900 and was stationed at Aldershot. It was disembodied at Welshpool on 5 December 1900.

== Disbandment ==
After the Boer War, there were moves to reform the Auxiliary Forces (militia, yeomanry and volunteers) to take their place in the six army corps proposed by St John Brodrick as Secretary of State for War. However, little of Brodrick's scheme was carried out. Under the sweeping Haldane Reforms of 1908, the militia was replaced by the Special Reserve, a semi-professional force similar to the previous militia reserve, whose role was to provide reinforcement drafts for regular units serving overseas in wartime. The Montgomeryshire battalion did not transfer to the Special Reserve and was disbanded on 31 July 1908.

== Commanders ==
The following commanded the regiment:

Colonel

- Sir John Pryce, 3rd Baronet, 1697
- Sir John Powell Pryce, 6th Baronet, 1763
- Edward Devereux, 12th Viscount Hereford, 1764
- George Herbert, 2nd Earl of Powis, 1778
- Thomas Browne of Mellington, 1794

Lieutenant-Colonel Commandant

- John Davies of Nantcribba Hall, 22 July 1811, died 1842
- Edward Herbert, 2nd Earl of Powis (of the third creation), 1846, died 1848
- Sir John Conroy, 1st Baronet (formerly of the Royal Artillery), 30 August 1852, died 1854
- Hon Henry Hanbury-Tracy, 1 May 1854
- John Edward Harryman Pryce of Gunley (formerly of the 2nd Foot), 25 June 1855
- George Beadnall of Llanidloes (formerly of the Bengal Army), 21 November 1866
- John Heyward Heyward, 3 June 1876
- John Harrison of Caerhowell, 19 April 1879
- Offley John Crewe Reade of Llandinam Hall, 25 April 1882
- C.E. Ramsbotton-Isherwood, 1896
- Edward Sydney St Barbe Sladen, 1903

Honorary Colonel

- George Beadnall, former CO, appointed 17 December 1870
- John Heyward Heyward, former CO, appointed 25 June 1879
- George Herbert, 4th Earl of Powis, appointed 16 April 1898

== Heritage and ceremonial ==
=== Colours ===
When the Duke of Beaufort inspected the regiment in 1684, they paraded under a white Regimental colour, while the cornet of the troop of horse was also white and bore a scroll inscribed 'PRO REGE' surmounted by a right arm in natural colours holding a red heart. From 1763 to about 1804 the colour carried the coat of arms of the Lord Lieutenant of Montgomeryshire on a blue sheet. In about 1804 the regimental colour was changed to garter blue with the Union Flag in the canton; in the centre a crowned Union Wreath of roses, thistles and shamrocks surrounded the Royal cypher; below the wreath were three gold scrolls, one above the other, carrying the title 'ROYAL' 'MONTGOMERY' 'MILITIA'. Rifle regiments do not carry colours, so they were laid up at St Mary's Church, Welshpool, when the regiment was converted in 1853. On conversion back to line infantry as a battalion of the SWB it was presented with new colours: both the Queen's and Regimental colours bore in the centre a crowned garter displaying the title 'SOUTH WALES BORDERERS' and enclosing the Roman numeral 'IV'.

=== Uniforms and insignia ===
From 1763 to 1853 the uniform was similar to that of the regular infantry of the line, with blue facings on the red coat. On conversion to light infantry in 1810 the plume in the headdress was changed from white to green. On conversion to rifles in 1853 the uniform changed to Rifle green with dark blue facings, the facings changing to scarlet in 1856. As a battalion of the South Wales Borderer it adopted that regiment's red uniform with white facings (changed to grass green in 1905).

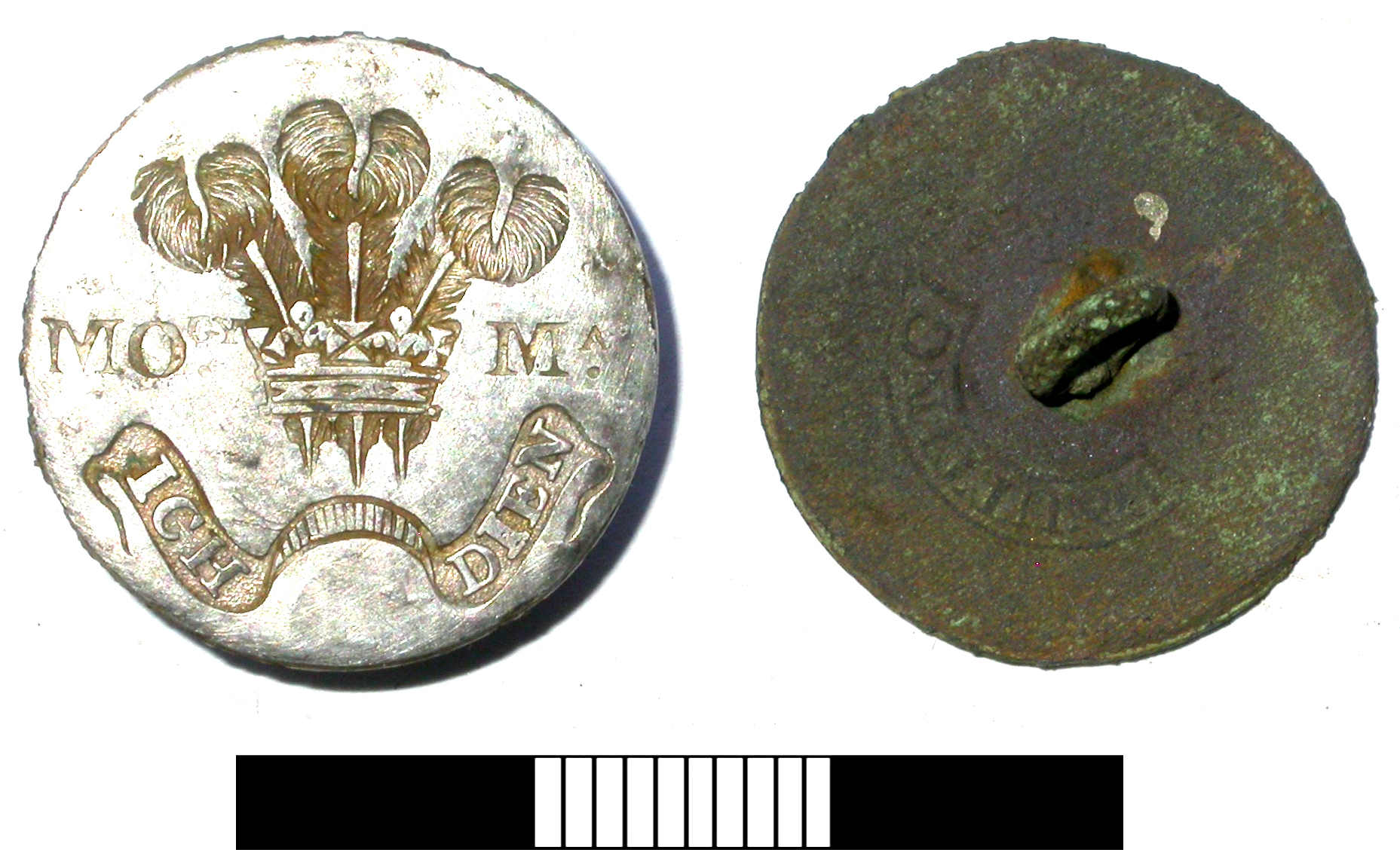
Montgomeryshire Militia button ca1800–32 excavated in Surrey (Portable Antiquities Scheme, FindID 395497).

The officers' gilt shoulder-belt plate ca 1800 had a silver design of the Prince of Wales's feathers and coronet inside a crown garter inscribed 'MONTGOMERY MILITIA'. In 1813 the design was the same, but the Prince of Wales's motto Ich Dien had been added beneath the coronet. The officer's plate in 1867-81 was now silver and the design was a French bugle-horn inside a circle inscribed 'ROYAL MONTGOMERY RIFLES', all in the centre of a Maltese cross and wreath, surmounted by the Prince of Wales's feathers, coronet and motto. The black metal badge of the other ranks' 'pork pie' undress cap of ca 1850 had a light infantry bugle-horn with a scroll beneath inscribed 'ROYAL MONTGOMERY'. The other ranks' buttons of 1876–81 were of the standard 'crown' pattern. In 1881 the battalion adopted the SWB badge and insignia.

=== Precedence ===
In 1760 a system of drawing lots was introduced to determine the relative precedence of militia regiments serving together. During the War of American Independence the counties were given an order of precedence determined by ballot each year. For the Montgomeryshire Militia the positions were:

- 1778 – 26th
- 1779 – 12th
- 1780 – 4th
- 1781 – 35th

The militia order of precedence balloted for in 1793 (Montgomeryshire was 13th) remained in force throughout the French Revolutionary War. Another ballot for precedence took place at the start of the Napoleonic War, when Montgomeryshire was 26th. This order continued until 1833. In that year the King drew the lots and the resulting list remained in force with minor amendments until the end of the militia. The regiments raised before the peace of 1763 took the first 47 places; the Montgomeryshire was formed just after the peace and was included in the second group and was awarded 57th place. The regimental number was only a subsidiary title and most regiments paid little attention to it.

== See also ==
- Trained Bands
- Militia (English)
- Militia (Great Britain)
- Militia (United Kingdom)
- South Wales Borderers
