= 1862 Montgomeryshire by-election =

UK parliamentary by-election

The 1862 Montgomery by-election was a parliamentary by-election held on 14 July 1862 for the British House of Commons constituency of Montgomeryshire, known at the time as Montgomery.

== Cause ==
The seat had become vacant when the constituency's Member of Parliament (MP), Herbert Williams-Wynn died.

== Candidates ==
Two candidates were nominated.

- Charles Williams-Wynn was the son of Charles Williams-Wynn, who was M.P. for Montgomeryshire 1796–1850, and was a Deputy Lieutenant and J.P. for Montgomeryshire, and captain in the Montgomery Yeomanry Cavalry. He was the Conservative Party candidate and held the seat in the by-election.
- Sudeley Hanbury-Tracy was a British colliery owner. He succeeded his father as Baron Sudeley in February 1863, aged 25. He also succeeded his father as Lord-Lieutenant of Montgomeryshire, a post he held until his death aged 40. He was the Liberal Party candidate.

== Result ==
Montgomery by-election, 1862
Party	Candidate	Votes	%	±%
Conservative	Charles Williams-Wynn	1,269	57.0	N/A
Liberal	Sudeley Hanbury-Tracy	959	43.0	N/A
Majority		310	14.0	N/A
Turnout		2,228	83.3	N/A
Registered electors		2,675		
Conservative hold		Swing		

== See also ==
- Montgomeryshire constituency
- List of United Kingdom by-elections (1857–1868)
