= Herbert Williams-Wynn =

Herbert Williams-Wynn may refer to:

- Sir Herbert Williams-Wynn, 7th Baronet (1860–1944), Welsh politician and Yeomanry officer
- Herbert Watkin Williams-Wynn (1822–1862), British Conservative politician
