= 1894 Montgomeryshire by-election =

UK parliamentary by-election

The 1894 Montgomery by-election was a parliamentary by-election held on 29 March 1894 for the British House of Commons constituency of Montgomeryshire, known at the time as Montgomery.

== Cause ==
The seat had become vacant when the constituency's Member of Parliament (MP), Stuart Rendel, was elevated to the peerage.

== Candidates ==
Two candidates were nominated.

Arthur Humphreys-Owen was a Welsh barrister, landowner, sometime Deputy Lieutenant of Montgomeryshire, and was chairman of Montgomeryshire County Council for a time. He was the Liberal Party candidate and held the seat in the by-election.

Watkin Williams-Wynn was a Welsh soldier, landowner and Master of the Flint and Denbigh Foxhounds. He was the Conservative Party candidate.

== Result ==
1894 Montgomeryshire by-election
Party	Candidate	Votes	%	±%
Liberal	Arthur Humphreys-Owen	3,440	51.7	−4.6
Conservative	Watkin Williams-Wynn	3,215	48.3	+4.6
Majority		225	3.4	−9.2
Turnout		6,655	82.2	+8.9
Registered electors		8,092		
Liberal hold		Swing	-4.6	

== See also ==
- Montgomeryshire constituency
- List of United Kingdom by-elections
