= Edward Vaughan (of Llwydiarth) =

Welsh politician

Edward Vaughan (c.1600–1661) was a Welsh politician who sat in the House of Commons at various times between 1626 and 1661.

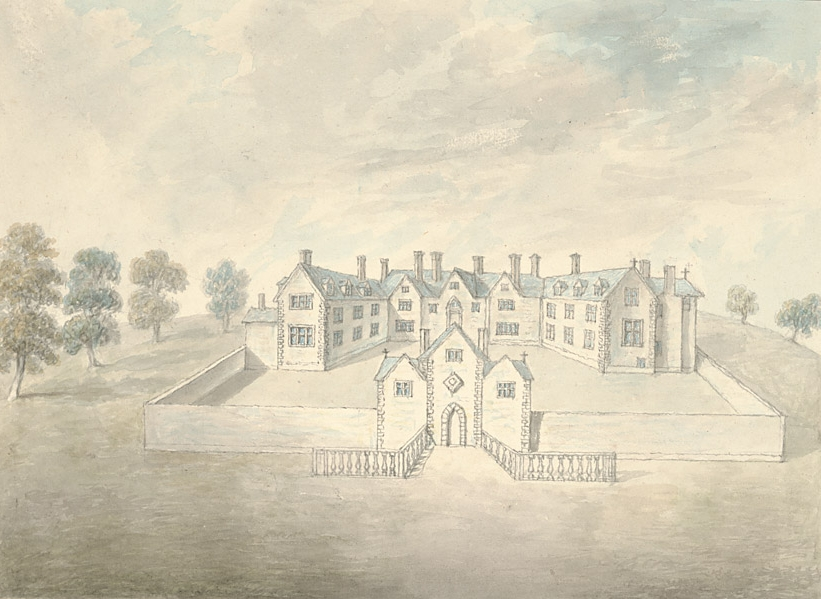
Llwydiarth, 1794

Vaughan was the son of Owen Vaughan of Llwydiarth. He was admitted to the Inner Temple in November 1618. In 1626, he was elected Member of Parliament for Merioneth.

In the Civil War, Vaughan was a captain in the Parliamentary army. In 1647 he was elected MP for Montgomeryshire as a recruiter for the Long Parliament. He was a commissioner for North Wales in June 1648. He voted in the House on 7 December 1648 "that the King's answer to the proposition of both Houses was a ground for peace " and as a result was secluded under Pride's Purge and imprisoned. On 27 April 1649, the Committee for the Advance of Money ordered Edward Vaughan to be brought up in custody before them to answer certain matters touching his estates, as he had hitherto treated their orders with contempt. However he was an active commissioner of sequestration for Montgomeryshire and was "commended for his diligence in seizing delinquents's estates," by the London commissioners on 19 September 1650.

He was appointed to serve as High Sheriff of Montgomeryshire for 1658 but served the office for two years 1658–1660. In 1659 Vaughan was again elected MP for Montgomeryshire. A petition by John Griffiths in November 1660 asked for "a warrant to recover from Edward Vaughan of Llwydiarth co. Montgomery, the balance of £1,600 received by him in 1648 as a commissioner for disbanding the army. He was elected MP for Montgomeryshire in Apnl 1661 for the Cavalier Parliament and sat until his death a few months afterwards."

Vaughan's brother Sir Robert Vaughan by deed dated 2 February 1623 conveyed all his lands in Montgomeryshire, Denbigh, and Merioneth to him.

Parliament of England
Preceded by Henry Wynn	Member of Parliament for Merioneth; 1626	Succeeded by Richard Vaughan
Preceded by John Pryce	Member of Parliament for Montgomeryshire; 1647–1648	Succeeded by Not represented in Rump Parliament
Preceded by Hugh Pryce; Charles Lloyd	Member of Parliament for Montgomeryshire; 1659	Succeeded by Not represented in Restored Rump
