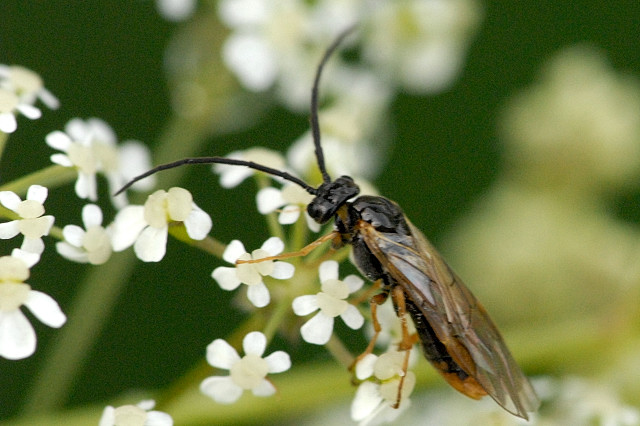

Scientific classification
- Domain: Eukaryota
- Kingdom: Animalia
- Phylum: Arthropoda
- Class: Insecta
- Order: Hymenoptera
- Suborder: Symphyta
- Family: Tenthredinidae
- Tribe: Nematini
- Genus: Pachynematus; Konow, 1890

= Pachynematus =

Genus of sawflies

Pachynematus is a genus of common sawflies in the family Tenthredinidae. There are at least fifty described species in Pachynematus.

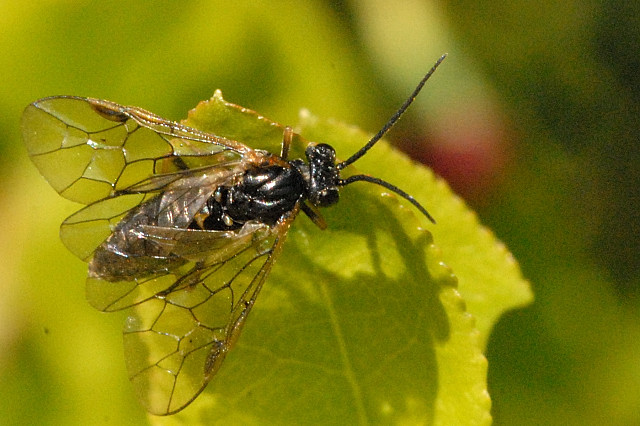

== Species ==
These 54 species belong to the genus Pachynematus:

- Pachynematus acutiventris (Hellén, 1948)^{g}
- Pachynematus aequalis Lindqvist, 1974^{g}
- Pachynematus albipennis (Hartig, 1837)^{g}
- Pachynematus albiventris Lindqvist, 1958^{g}
- Pachynematus angustatus Lindqvist, 1949^{g}
- Pachynematus annulatus (Gimmerthal, 1834)^{g}
- Pachynematus apicalis (Hartig, 1837)^{g}
- Pachynematus aurantiacus Marlatt, 1896^{b}
- Pachynematus calcicola Benson, 1948^{g}
- Pachynematus caucasicus Liston, Taeger & Blank, 2009^{g}
- Pachynematus clibrichellus (Cameron, 1878)^{g}
- Pachynematus clitellatus (Serville, 1823)^{g}
- Pachynematus corniger^{b}
- Pachynematus declinatus (Forster, 1854)^{g}
- Pachynematus dentatus Lindqvist, 1937^{g}
- Pachynematus duplex (Serville, 1823)^{g}
- Pachynematus excisus (Thomson, 1862)^{g}
- Pachynematus extensicornis (Norton)^{i c g b} (grass sawfly)
- Pachynematus fallax (Serville, 1823)^{g}
- Pachynematus gehrsi (Konow, 1904)^{g}
- Pachynematus glabriceps Lindqvist, 1949^{g}
- Pachynematus hungaricus Haris, 2001^{g}
- Pachynematus imperfectus (Zaddach, 1876)^{g}
- Pachynematus infirmus (Foerster, 1854)^{g}
- Pachynematus inopinatus Lindqvist, 1949^{g}
- Pachynematus insignis (Hartig, 1840)^{g}
- Pachynematus itoi Okutani, 1955^{g}
- Pachynematus kirbyi (Dahlbom, 1835)^{g}
- Pachynematus laevigatus (Zaddach, 1882)^{g}
- Pachynematus legirupus Konow, 1903^{g}
- Pachynematus lichtwardti Konow, 1903^{g}
- Pachynematus moerens (Foerster, 1854)^{g}
- Pachynematus montanus (Zaddach, 1883)^{g}
- Pachynematus nigerrimus Konow, 1903^{g}
- Pachynematus obductus (Hartig, 1837)^{g}
- Pachynematus omega (Benson, 1955)^{g}
- Pachynematus pallescens (Hartig, 1837)^{g}
- Pachynematus parvilabris (Thomson, 1862)^{g}
- Pachynematus pumilio Konow, 1903^{g}
- Pachynematus punctifrons Malaise, 1921^{g}
- Pachynematus rugosulus Lindqvist, 1959^{g}
- Pachynematus rumicis (Linnaeus, 1758)^{g}
- Pachynematus salicicola Enslin, 1916^{g}
- Pachynematus scutellatus (Hartig, 1837)^{g}
- Pachynematus smithae Ross, 1945^{g}
- Pachynematus styx Benson, 1958^{g}
- Pachynematus sulcatus Benson, 1948^{g}
- Pachynematus taegeri (Lacourt, 1996)^{g}
- Pachynematus tatricus Roller & Haris, 2008^{g}
- Pachynematus tenuiserra Lindqvist, 1949^{g}
- Pachynematus udus (Holmgren, 1883)^{g}
- Pachynematus vaginosus (Konow, 1903)^{g}
- Pachynematus vagus (Fabricius, 1781)^{g}
- Pachynematus xanthocarpus (Hartig, 1840)^{g}

Data sources: i = ITIS, c = Catalogue of Life, g = GBIF, b = Bugguide.net
