= Carl Clowes =

Welsh medical practitioner (1943–2021)

Carl Iwan Clowes
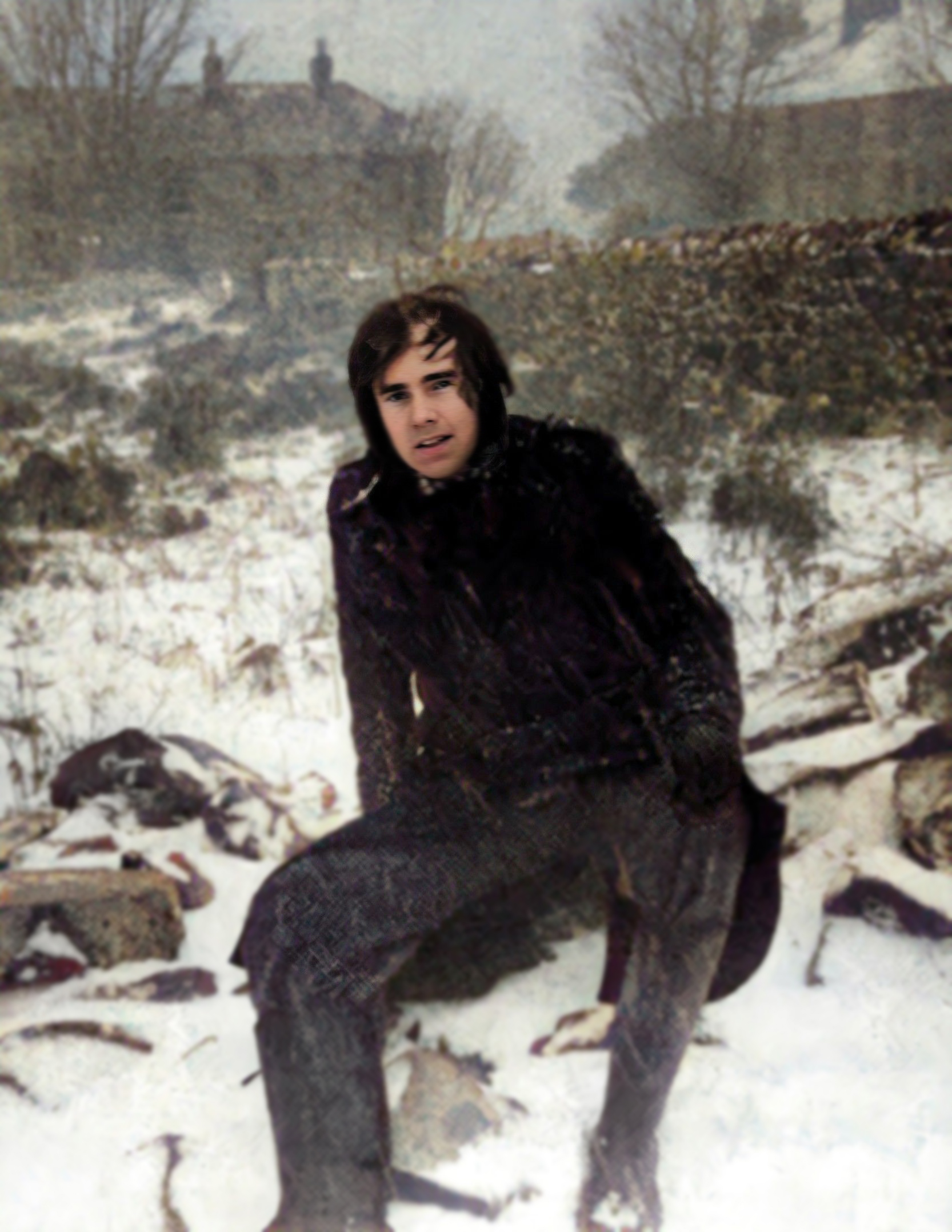
- Born: Carl Iwan Clowes; 11 December 1943; Manchester, England
- Died: 4 December 2021 (aged 77); Pencaenewydd, North Wales
- Occupations: Doctor, Welsh-language activist and campaigner
- Known for: Rescuing the community of Nant Gwrtheyrn and setting up the National Welsh Language and Heritage Centre
- Relatives: Cian Ciaran (son); Dafydd Ieuan (son)
- Awards: OBE

Carl Iwan Clowes OBE (11 December 1943 – 4 December 2021) was a Welsh medical practitioner. In 1978 he founded the Nant Gwrtheyrn Trust in order to buy the village of Nant Gwrtheyrn, to restore and regenerate it and to set up a Welsh language centre.

Clowes was born and brought up in Manchester, his mother was Welsh (and spoke Welsh) and his father was English. When his parents returned to north Wales, he set about learning Welsh. After qualifying as a doctor in 1967, he spent eight years as a doctor in Llanaelhaearn on the Llŷn peninsula before gaining a master's degree in social medicine from the London School of Hygiene and Tropical Medicine.

In 1974, he was the inaugural chairman of Antur Aelhaearn; the first community co-operative in the United Kingdom, which was established to save the local school. He was also the inaugural chairman and president of Dolen Cymru, a charity that was established in 1985 to build a relationship between Wales and the southern African country of Lesotho.

He was the Plaid Cymru candidate for the Montgomeryshire constituency in the 1979, 1983 and 1987 UK general elections.

== Personal life ==
He was married and had four children including Dafydd and Cian who were members of the band Super Furry Animals.

He died at the age of 77 at his home in Pencaenewydd, Llŷn, and was interred at Llanaelhaearn cemetery.

== Publications ==
- Strategaeth Iaith 1991–2001 (in Welsh). Fforwm Iaith Genedlaethol. 1991. ISBN 9780000677105. – Strategy for the Welsh language
- Nant Gwrtheyrn (in Welsh). Y Lolfa. 2004. ISBN 9780862437282. – history and folk tales about Nant Gwrtheyrn and its language trust
- Super Furries, Prins Seeiso, Miss Siberia - A Fi (in Welsh). Y Lolfa. 2016. ISBN 978-1784611576. – autobiography
