= Pachynematus extensicornis =

Scientific classification
- Domain: Eukaryota
- Kingdom: Animalia
- Phylum: Arthropoda
- Class: Insecta
- Order: Hymenoptera
- Suborder: Symphyta
- Family: Tenthredinidae
- Tribe: Nematini
- Genus: Pachynematus
- Species: P. extensicornis

Binomial name
- Pachynematus extensicornis (Norton)

Species of sawfly

Pachynematus extensicornis, the grass sawfly, is a species of common sawfly in the family Tenthredinidae.
