= Pryce baronets =

Extinct baronetcy in the Baronetage of England

The Pryce Baronetcy, of Newton in the County of Montgomery, was a title in the Baronetage of England. It was created on 15 August 1628 for John Pryce, later member of parliament for Montgomeryshire. The title became extinct on the death of the seventh Baronet in 1791.

The Pryce Baronetcy, of Gogerddan in the County of Cardiganshire, was a title in the Baronetage of England. It was created on 9 August 1641 for Sir Richard Pryce, 1st Baronet. The title became extinct on the death of the fourth Baronet in c. 1695.

== Pryce baronets, of Newton (1628) ==
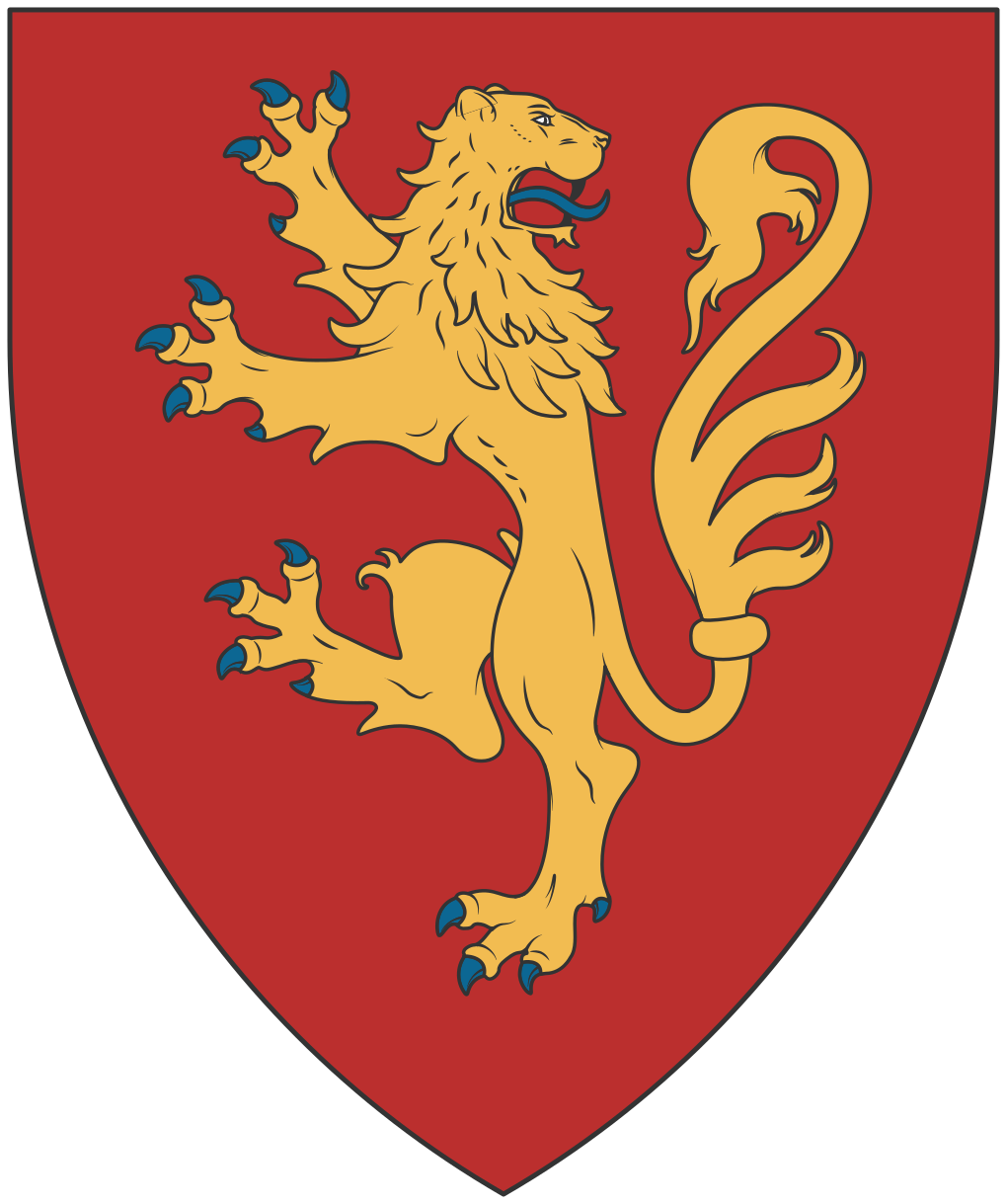
Arms of Pryce of Newton

- Sir John Pryce, 1st Baronet (died c. 1657)
- Sir Matthew Pryce, 2nd Baronet (died c. 1674)
- Sir John Pryce, 3rd Baronet (c. 1662–1699)
- Sir Vaughan Pryce, 4th Baronet (c. 1720)
- Sir John Pryce, 5th Baronet (died 1761)
- Sir John Powell Pryce, 6th Baronet (died 1776)
- Sir Edward Mamley Pryce, 7th Baronet (died 1791)

== Pryce baronets, of Gogerddan (1641) ==
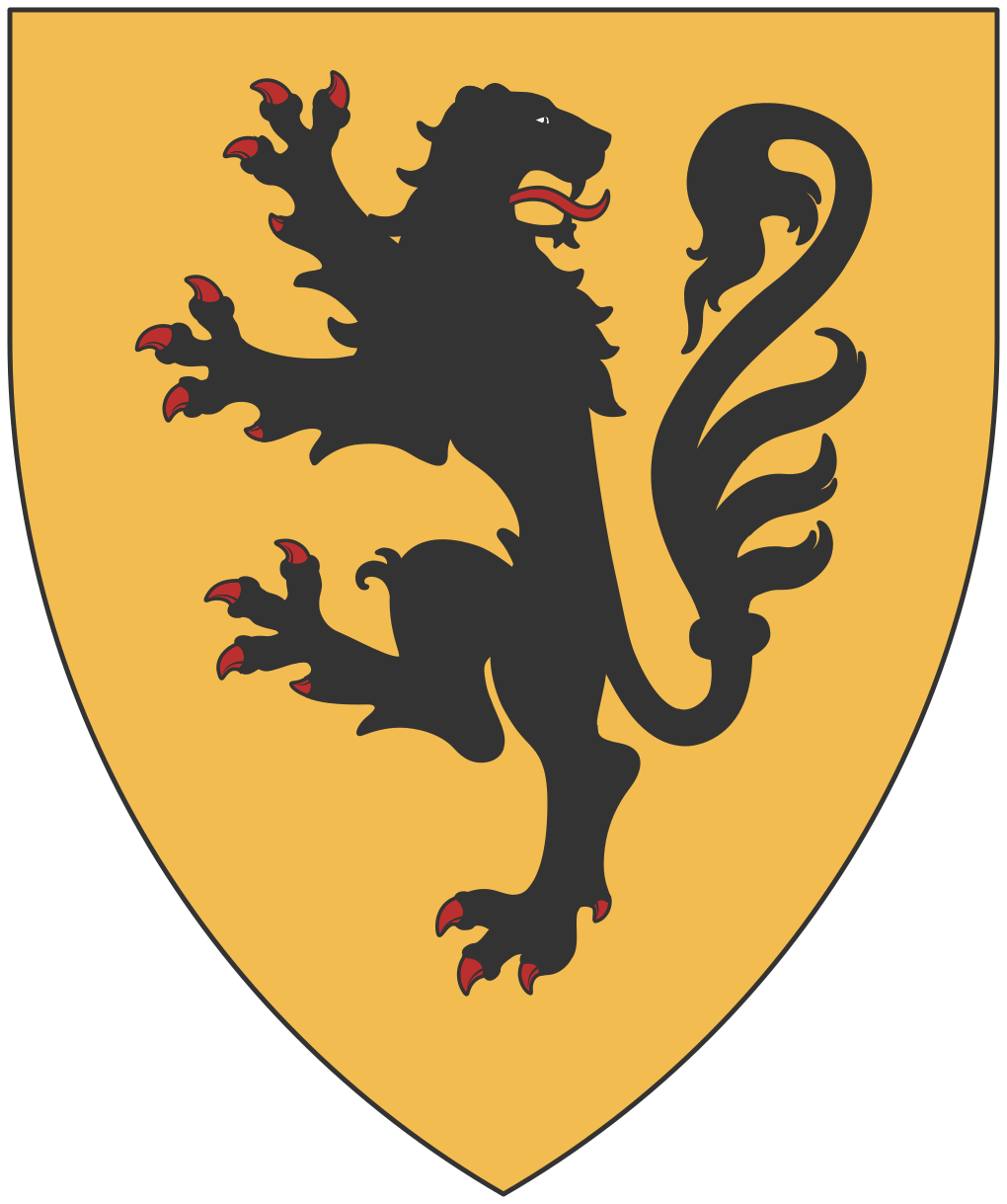
Arms of Pryce of Gogerddant

- Sir Richard Pryse, 1st Baronet (died 1651)
- Sir Richard Pryse, 2nd Baronet (died by 1675)
- Sir Thomas Pryse, 3rd Baronet (died 1682)
- Sir Carbery Pryse, 4th Baronet (died c. 1695)

== See also ==
- Pryce-Jones baronets
