= 1850 Montgomeryshire by-election =

UK parliamentary by-election

The 1850 Montgomeryshire by-election to the Parliament of the United Kingdom was held on 11 October 1850 after the death of the incumbent Conservative MP Charles Williams-Wynn. It was retained by the Conservative candidate Herbert Watkin Williams-Wynn, who was elected unopposed.

== Result ==
1850 Montgomeryshire by-election
Party	Candidate	Votes	%	±%
Conservative	Herbert Watkin Williams-Wynn	Unopposed		
Registered electors				
Conservative hold				

He went on to be re-elected unopposed until his own death in 1862.
