= Oliver Lloyd (MP) =

Member of the Parliament of England

Oliver Lloyd (c. 1527 – probably 1589), of Leighton, Montgomeryshire, was a Welsh politician from Pontyclun.

He was a member (MP) of the parliament of England for Montgomeryshire in 1586.
