= Charles Williams-Wynn (1822–1896) =

British politician (1822–1896)

Charles Williams-Wynn MP
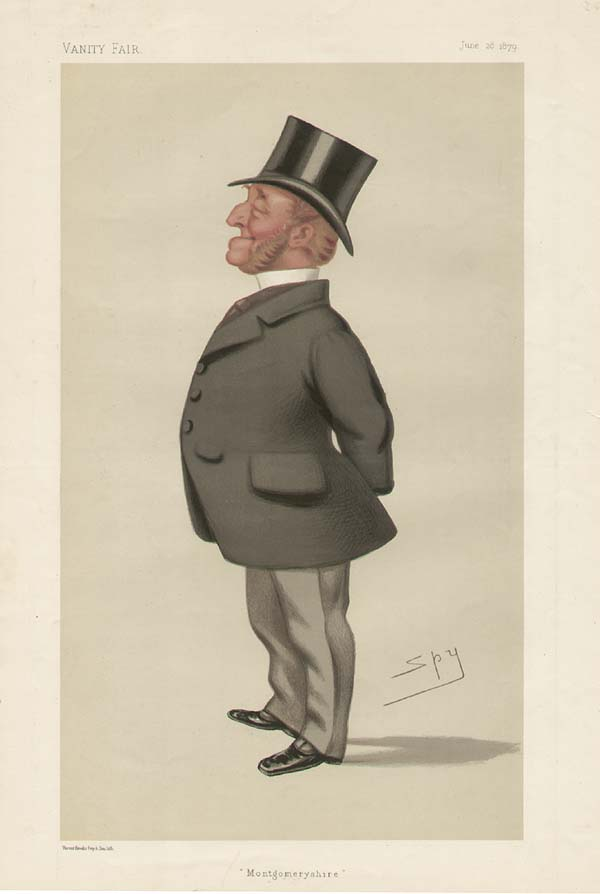
- Vanity Fair caricature of Williams-Wynn by Spy

Member of Parliament for Montgomeryshire
- In office 1868; 158 years ago – 1880; 146 years ago
- Preceded by: Herbert Williams-Wynn
- Succeeded by: Stuart Rendel

Personal details
- Born: Charles Watkin Williams-Wynn; 4 October 1822
- Died: 25 April 1896 (aged 73)
- Party: Conservative
- Spouse: Lady Annora Charlotte Pierrepont
- Children: Mary Williams-Wynn
- Parents: Charles Williams-Wynn (father); Mary Cunliffe (mother)
- Education: Westminster School, Christ Church, Oxford
- Occupation: politician

Charles Watkin Williams-Wynn (4 October 1822 – 25 April 1896) was a Welsh Conservative politician who sat in the House of Commons from 1868 to 1880.

Williams-Wynn was the son of Charles Williams-Wynn, who was MP for Montgomeryshire 1796–1850, and his wife Mary Cunliffe daughter of Sir Foster Cunliffe, 3rd Baronet. He was educated at Westminster School and at Christ Church, Oxford graduating BA in 1843 and MA in 1846. He was called to the bar at Lincoln's Inn in May 1846. He was a deputy lieutenant and J.P. for Montgomeryshire, and captain in the Montgomery Yeomanry Cavalry.

In 1862 Williams-Wynn was elected member of parliament for Montgomeryshire. He held the seat until 1880.

Williams-Wynn died at the age of 73.

Williams-Wynn married Lady Annora Charlotte Pierrepont daughter of Charles Pierrepont, 2nd Earl Manvers. They had a daughter, Mary Williams-Wynn, who married Henry Goulburn Chetwynd Stapylton JP in 1886.

Parliament of the United Kingdom
| Preceded by Herbert Williams-Wynn | Member of Parliament for Montgomeryshire; 1862–1880 | Succeeded by Stuart Rendel |
