= David Davies, 3rd Baron Davies =

British hereditary peer (1940–2024)

The Right Honourable The Lord Davies DL

Member of the House of Lords
- Lord Temporal
- as a hereditary peer 1 September 1944 – 11 November 1999
- Preceded by: The 2nd Baron Davies
- Succeeded by: Seat abolished (Note: Under the House of Lords Act 1999.)

Personal details
- Born: 2 October 1940
- Died: 7 February 2024 (aged 83)
- Party: Liberal Democrats
- Occupation: Peer, engineer

David Davies, 3rd Baron Davies, DL (2 October 1940 – 7 February 2024), was a British hereditary peer and engineer.

== Biography ==
Davies was the eldest son of David Davies, 2nd Baron Davies, and Ruth Dugdale, daughter of William Marshall Dugdale. He succeeded in the barony at the age of three after his father was killed in the Second World War. He was educated at Eton and King's College, Cambridge, and later became a chartered engineer. From 1975 to 2000 he was Chairman of the Welsh National Opera.

Davies spoke five times in the House of Lords during the 1990s, but lost his seat in Parliament after the passing of the House of Lords Act 1999. He was appointed a Deputy Lieutenant of Powys in 1997 and served as Vice-Lord-Lieutenant of the county in 2004.

Lord Davies married Beryl Oliver, daughter of William James Oliver, in 1972. They had two sons and two daughters. His wife served as High Sheriff of Powys 2004–2005. They lived in the family's ancestral home in Llandinam, Plas Dinam, until 2011.

Davies died on 7 February 2024, at the age of 83.

== Arms ==
Coat of arms of David Davies, 3rd Baron Davies
Crest An arm embowed Proper vested to the elbow Argent holding in the hand a miner's safety lamp Proper. Escutcheon Or a lion rampant Gules between two fleurs-de-lis in fess Azure on a chief Azure two pickaxes fesswise. Motto (The Highest Nobility Is Virtue)

== Notes ==
Peerage of the United Kingdom
Preceded by David Davies	Baron Davies; 1944–2024; Member of the House of Lords (1944–1999)	Succeeded by David Davies
