= David Davies, 1st Baron Davies =

Welsh Liberal politician (1880-1944)

The Right Honourable The Lord Davies FRGS
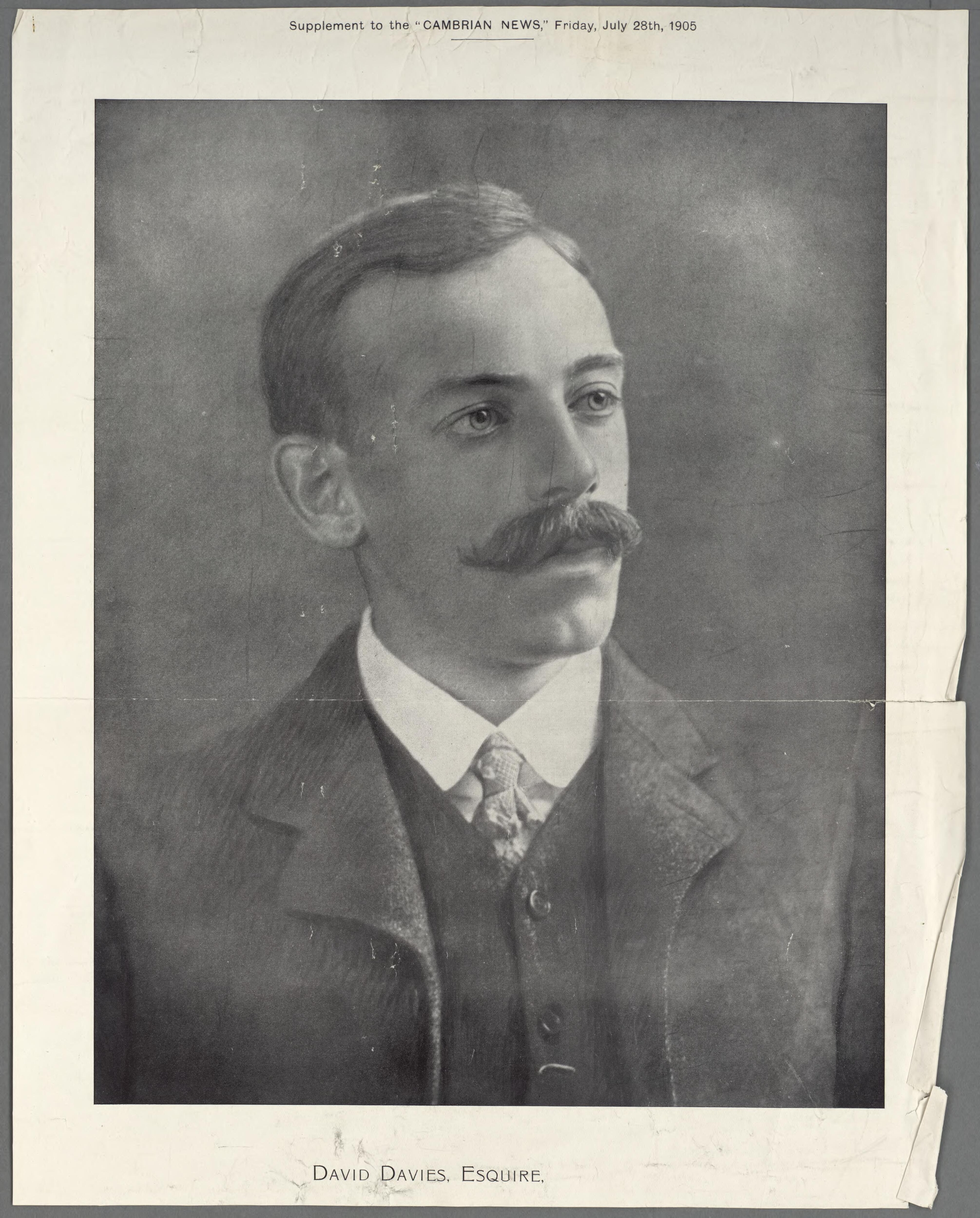
- David Davies, circa 1905

Member of Parliament for Montgomeryshire
- In office 1906–1929
- Preceded by: Arthur Humphreys-Owen
- Succeeded by: Clement Davies

Parliamentary Private Secretary to the Prime Minister
- In office 1916–1918
- Prime Minister: David Lloyd George
- Preceded by: Sir John Barran
- Succeeded by: William Sutherland

Personal details
- Born: David Davies; 11 May 1880 Llandinam, Montgomeryshire
- Died: 16 June 1944 (aged 64)
- Party: Liberal
- Spouse(s): Amy Penman (m. 1910; died 1918) Henrietta Margaret Fergusson (m. 1922)
- Children: 6
- Relatives: David Davies; Gwendoline Davies; Margaret Davies
- Education: Merchiston Castle School, Edinburgh
- Alma mater: King's College, Cambridge

Military service
- Allegiance: United Kingdom
- Branch/service: British Army
- Years of service: until 1916
- Unit: 14th Battalion of the Royal Welsh Fusiliers
- Battles/wars: First World War

David Davies, 1st Baron Davies FRGS (11 May 1880 – 16 June 1944) was a Welsh Liberal Party politician and public benefactor who was MP for Montgomeryshire from 1906 to 1929. He was a grandson of the Welsh industrialist David Davies. As a philanthropist, he established the King Edward VII Welsh National Memorial Association to combat tuberculosis in Wales, as well as the Wilson Chair of International Politics at the University College of Wales, Aberystwyth.

== Early life and education ==
Davies was born in Llandinam, Montgomeryshire, the first child of Edward Davies and May Jones. His father was the only son of David Davies, often known as David Davies Llandinam, who was the greatest Welsh industrialist of the Victorian era, having made his fortune in the coal mines.

He was educated at Merchiston Castle School and King's College, Cambridge, graduating in 1903. His family's wealth allowed the young Davies to travel extensively to exotic locations, where he enjoyed game hunting. He visited Africa, Asia and the United States, including Alaska. His two younger sisters, Gwendoline and Margaret, became renowned patrons of the arts.

== Career ==
Politically and personally, Davies followed the lead set by his grandfather. In 1906, at just 26, he was elected the Liberal Member of Parliament for the Montgomeryshire constituency.

In the First World War, he commanded the 14th Battalion of the Royal Welsh Fusiliers until 1916, when he was appointed Parliamentary Secretary to David Lloyd George. He accompanied Lord Milner on his trip to Russia, and he was a member of The Garden Suburb. According to Lord Riddell, Davies was the only member of the Russian mission to foreshadow the Russian revolution.

Following the war, Davies became an active supporter of the League of Nations. In 1929, Davies stood down prior to the general election to focus on international affairs.

Despite this, Davies continued to support the official Liberal Party. He became President of Montgomeryshire Liberal Association and was at odds with his successor as MP, Clement Davies. In 1931, Clement Davies became a Liberal National and continued to support the National Government after the official Liberal Party moved into opposition in 1933.

In 1932, he established the New Commonwealth Society for "the promotion of international law and order," writing several books on the right use of force, notably The Problem of the Twentieth Century (1930), which was translated into German and other languages.

We shall never get real prosperity and security until we get peace, we shall never get peace until we get justice, and we shall get none of these things until we succeed in establishing the rule of law by means of the creation of a really effective international authority equipped with those two vital institutions, an equity tribunal and an international police force.

— Lord Davies, The Problem of the Twentieth Century, 1930

His ideas influenced the writing of the United Nations Charter, especially with regards to sanctions and the transition of national armies to an international police.

On 24 June 1932, he was created Baron Davies of Llandinam, in the County of Montgomery, for public services.

In 1938, with a general election likely to occur in the near future, Lord Davies put pressure on Clement Davies by persuading the Montgomeryshire executive to seek clarification from their MP on his views regarding the National Government and appeasement. The MP shortly after avowedly opposed appeasement and resigned the Liberal National whip.

== Philanthropy ==
Like his sisters, Davies was a significant philanthropist who donated to a number of good causes both locally and nationally. In 1910, he contributed £150,000 (£15.3 million as of 2025) to the King Edward VII Welsh National Memorial, which was formed with the aim of eradicating tuberculosis in Wales.

With his sisters, Davies offered asylum in Wales during World War I to the Belgian artists George Minne, Valerius de Saedeleer, Elisabeth de Saedeleer and Gustave van de Woestijne.

He endowed perhaps the world's first Chair in International Politics, established in honour of Woodrow Wilson in 1919 at the University College of Wales, Aberystwyth, which also hosts the David Davies Memorial Institute of International Studies. He was also the president of the National Library of Wales.

The Welsh Temple of Peace in Cardiff was his brainchild, and was funded by Davies, to a great extent, pledging £58,000 in 1934 (equivalent to £4.6 million in 2024) towards the erection of a building.

== Family and issue ==
In 1910, Davies married his first wife Amy Penman, daughter of Lancelot Tulip Penman of Broadwood Park, and had two children:

- Maj. David Michael Davies, 2nd Baron Davies (16 January 1915 – 25 September 1944) married Ruth Eldrydd Dugdale, daughter of Maj. William Marshall Dugdale, and had two sons
- Marguerite Elizabeth (26 April 1917 – 18 December 1930)

Four years after Amy's death in 1918, he remarried to Henrietta Margaret Fergusson, daughter of James Grant Fergusson of Baledmund, Perthshire, and had four more children:

- Hon. Edward Davies (30 January 1925 – 26 October 1997)
- Hon. Islwyn Edmund Evan Davies CBE (10 December 1926 – 5 October 2002)
- Hon. Mary Myfanwy (20 November 1923 – 21 September 2001)
- Hon. Gwendoline Rita Jean Davis Cormack (1 May 1929 – 4 June 2011)

In 1944, while launching a new X-Ray mobile scanning unit at Sully Hospital (which the Temple of Peace in Cardiff had funded), Davies volunteered to undergo the first routine chest scan. The scan revealed advanced cancer from which he died from a few months later in June 1944.

His eldest son and heir, Major Hon. David Michael Davies, was serving in the Royal Welsh Fusiliers when he was killed in action in September 1944, only a few months after inheriting the title. The latter's eldest son succeeded as the third Baron Davies, days prior to his fourth birthday.

A statue commissioned in honour of his Grandfather stands in Llandinam in Powys on the A470. The Llandinam Building at Aberystwyth University was named in his honour.

== Arms ==
Coat of arms of David Davies, 1st Baron Davies
Crest An arm embowed Proper vested to the elbow Argent holding in the hand a miner's safety lamp Proper. Escutcheon Or a lion rampant Gules between two fleurs-de-lis in fess Azure on a chief Azure two pickaxes fesswise. Motto (The Highest Nobility Is Virtue)

Parliament of the United Kingdom
Preceded by Arthur Humphreys-Owen	Member of Parliament for Montgomeryshire; 1906–1929	Succeeded by Clement Davies
Government offices
Preceded by Sir John Barran	Parliamentary Private Secretary to the Prime Minister; 1916–1918	Succeeded by William Sutherland
Peerage of the United Kingdom
New creation	Baron Davies; 1932–1944	Succeeded by David Michael Davies
