= Baron Davies =

Title in the Peerage of the United Kingdom

Baron Davies, of Llandinam in the County of Montgomery, is a title in the Peerage of the United Kingdom. It was created in 1932 for the Welsh businessman, Liberal member of parliament and philanthropist, David Davies. He was the grandson and namesake of the prominent industrialist David Davies Llandinam.

The second Baron Davies was the son of the first Baron and his first wife, Amy, daughter of L. T. Penman. He married Ruth, daughter of Major William Marshall Dugdale, in 1939. They had two sons. Lord Davies fought in the Second World War as a major in the Royal Welch Fusiliers and was killed on the Western Front in September 1944, aged 29, only three months after succeeding his father in the barony. His three-year-old eldest son, David, inherited the barony shortly before his fourth birthday.

As of 2026, the title is held by the fourth Baron, who succeeded his father in that year.

== Barons Davies (1932) ==
- David Davies, 1st Baron Davies (1880–1944)
- David Davies, 2nd Baron Davies (16 January 1915 – † 25 September 1944)
- David Davies, 3rd Baron Davies (1940–2024)
- David Daniel Davies, 4th Baron Davies (b. 1975)

The heir presumptive is the current holder's brother, The Hon. Benjamin Michael Graham Davies (b. 1985)

== Arms ==
Coat of arms of Baron Davies
Crest An arm embowed Proper vested to the elbow Argent holding in the hand a miner's safety lamp Proper. Escutcheon Or a lion rampant Gules between two fleurs-de-lis in fess Azure on a chief Azure two pickaxes fesswise. Motto (The Highest Nobility Is Virtue)
