= Herbert Watkin Williams-Wynn =

British politician

Member of Parliament for Montgomeryshire
- In office 11 October 1850 – 22 June 1862
- Preceded by: Charles Williams-Wynn
- Succeeded by: Charles Williams-Wynn

Personal details
- Born: 29 April 1822
- Died: 22 June 1862 (aged 40)
- Party: Conservative

Herbert Watkin Williams-Wynn (29 April 1822 – 22 June 1862) was a British Conservative politician.

Williams-Wynn was elected MP for Montgomeryshire at a by-election in 1850—caused by the death of Charles Williams-Wynn—and held the seat until his own death in 1862.

Parliament of the United Kingdom
Preceded by Charles Williams-Wynn	Member of Parliament for Montgomeryshire; 1850–1862	Succeeded by Charles Williams-Wynn
