= Arthur Humphreys-Owen =

British politician

Arthur Humphreys-Owen

Arthur Charles Humphreys-Owen (9 November 1836 – 9 December 1905) was a Welsh barrister, landowner and Liberal politician.

Humphreys-Owen was born at Garthmyl, Montgomeryshire, the son of Erskine Humphreys, a barrister. He was educated at Harrow School and Trinity College, Cambridge. In 1874 he married Maria Russell, the daughter of a Queen's Counsel.

Humphreys-Owen was himself called to the bar at Lincoln's Inn in 1863. He later became a Justice of the Peace. He was chairman of the Cambrian Railways Company from 1900. In 1876 he had inherited the estates of the Owens of Glansevern and added the name Owen to his surname. As a landowner he had nearly 8,000 acres (32 km^{2}) to his name.

He was sometime Deputy Lieutenant of Montgomeryshire and was chairman of Montgomeryshire County Council. He was a strong supporter of education and chaired the Central Welsh Board for Intermediate Education from 1896 to 1905. From 1894 he was elected Liberal Member of Parliament for Montgomeryshire in a by-election to succeed Stuart Rendel on his elevation to the peerage. He scraped home in the election by only 225 votes, a drop from Rendel's majority of 600 but he held the seat until his death, aged 69, in 1905.

Parliament of the United Kingdom
Preceded by Stuart Rendel	Member of Parliament for Montgomeryshire; 1894–1905	Succeeded by David Davies
