= Humphrey Lloyd (by 1498 – 1562 or later) =

English politician

Humphrey Lloyd (by 1498 – 1562 or later) was a Welsh politician.

He was a member (MP) of the parliament of England for Montgomeryshire in 1545 and 1547.
