= Sir John Pryce, 1st Baronet =

Anglo-Welsh Baronet and Member of Parliament

Sir John Pryce, 1st Baronet (c. 1596 – c. 1657), sometimes also spelt Price, was an Anglo-Welsh Baronet and Member of Parliament.

== Origins ==
He was the son and heir of Edward Pryce of Newton, Montgomeryshire.

== Career ==
In November 1614 Pryce was admitted a student of the Inner Temple. Initially a Royalist, in 1628 he was created a Baronet.

In October 1640, at the outset of the Long Parliament, he was elected to the House of Commons from Montgomeryshire. On 12 October 1642, together with his fellow-member Richard Herbert he was disabled from sitting in parliament, on account of their having joined the king at Oxford in the initial stages of the English Civil War. In 1644, though, he changed sides and was appointed Parliament's Governor of Montgomery Castle. In the First Protectorate Parliament of 1654–1655, he returned to the Commons, again as a member for Montgomeryshire.

== Marriage and children ==
Pryce married Catherine, daughter of Sir Richard Pryse of Gogerddan, and was the ancestor of a long line of Pryce Baronets. His daughter Juliana Pryce (died 1720), married Joseph Davie (died 1723) of Orleigh Court in the parish of Buckland Brewer, Devon. She died of smallpox and is mentioned on the elaborate mural monument to her father-in-law John I Davie (died 1710) in St Mary's Church, Buckland Brewer, as follows:

Underneath lies the body of Juliana the wife of Joseph Davie of Orleigh, Esq., and daughter of sr. John Pryce of Newtown in ye County of Montgomery, Bar(on)et. who departed this life the 5th of Febry. 1720 in the 28th year of her age in the small pox to the unspeakable affliction of her husband children and relations and to ye great grieff of all that knew her. She was a woman that was indued with as much beauty virtue and goodness as ever lived or ever died. In sad remembrance this small stone is erected to her memory by her unhappy but faithfull partner.

Juliana's husband carried out much rebuilding work to Orleigh Court and the arms of Davie impaling Pryce (Gules, a lion rampant regardant or) survive on several elaborately decorated lead hopper-heads forming part of the roof guttering.

== Death ==
He died in about 1657.

== Notes ==
Baronetage of England
New creation	Baronet (of Newton); 1628–1657	Succeeded by Matthew Pryce
