= Montgomeryshire (UK Parliament constituency) =

UK Parliament constituency (1542–2024)

Coordinates: 52.640°N 3.469°W

- Former county constituency for the House of Commons
- Boundary of Montgomeryshire in Wales
- Preserved county: Powys
- Electorate: 48,910 (December 2010)
- Major settlements: Newtown, Welshpool

1542–2024
- Seats: One
- Replaced by: Montgomeryshire and Glyndŵr
- Senedd: Montgomeryshire, Mid and West Wales

Montgomeryshire (Welsh: Sir Drefaldwyn) was a constituency (Note: A county constituency (for the purposes of election expenses and type of returning officer).) in Wales represented in the House of Commons of the UK Parliament.

Created in 1542, it elected one Member of Parliament (MP), formerly known as the knight of the shire, by the first-past-the-post system of election. It was abolished following the 2023 Periodic Review of Westminster constituencies prior to the 2024 general election and replaced by Montgomeryshire and Glyndŵr.

The Montgomeryshire Senedd constituency was created with the same boundaries in 1999 (as an Assembly constituency).

== Boundaries and political history ==
Map of boundaries 1983-2024

The seat was based on the ancient county of Montgomeryshire, in the principal area of Powys. One of Britain's most rural and isolated constituencies, Montgomeryshire elected Liberal or Liberal-affiliated candidates from 1880, until a Conservative victory in the 1979 general election. In the 1983 general election it was the only seat in England and Wales where a sitting Conservative MP was unseated, while nationally the party's seat majority increased. However, in 2010, the Conservatives won and held the seat in 2015 and 2017, with an increased majority. The seat was officially known as Montgomery before 1997. At the time of its abolition, Montgomeryshire was the only seat in Wales never to have elected a Labour MP.

Until 1918 this seat, in common with many others, contained an enclaved seat, which comprised the boroughs of Montgomery, Llanfyllin, Llanidloes, Newtown and Welshpool. This seat survived the Redistribution of Seats Act 1885 which abolished many similar seats. The seat was finally abolished in 1918 and absorbed into the wider Montgomeryshire seat.

Under proposed constituency boundary changes announced in September 2016, ahead of the next general election, the seat was to be partitioned, the northern half including Welshpool to be merged with Clwyd South to form a new seat of South Clwyd and North Montgomeryshire; most of the southern including Newtown was to be merged with the Brecon and Radnor seat to form a seat renamed as Brecon, Radnor and Montgomery, and the wards of Llanidloes and Blaen Hafren merged into the Ceredigion constituency which would form part of a new seat called Ceredigion and North Pembrokeshire. However, the general elections of 2017 and 2019 were fought on existing boundaries.

=== Abolition ===
The constituency was abolished as part of the 2023 Periodic Review of Westminster constituencies and under the June 2023 final recommendations of the Boundary Commission for Wales for the 2024 United Kingdom general election. The entire constituency became part of the new Montgomeryshire and Glyndŵr. The abolition ended 482 years of the constituent.

== Members of Parliament ==
=== 1542–1604 ===
Parliament	Member
1542	James Leche
1545	Humphrey Lloyd
1547	Humphrey Lloyd
1553 (Mar)	Edward Herbert
1553 (Oct)	Edward Herbert
1554 (Apr)	Edward Herbert
1554 (Nov)	Edward Herbert
1555	Not known
1558	Edward Herbert
1559 (Jan)	Edward Herbert I
1562–1563	Edward Herbert I
1571	Edward Herbert I
1572	John Price
1584 (Oct)	Richard Herbert
1586 (Oct)	Oliver Lloyd
1588 (Oct)	Edward Herbert I
1593	Reginald Williams
1597 (Sep)	William Herbert
1601 (Oct)	Edward Herbert

=== 1604–2024 ===
Election	Member	Party
1604–1611	William Herbert	
1614	William Herbert	
1621–1622	William Herbert	
1624	William Herbert	
1624–1629	William Herbert	
1640	Richard Herbert	
1640–1642	John Pryce	
1642	Seat vacant from 12 September 1642, when Pryce was disabled from sitting	
1647	Edward Vaughan	
1648	Seat vacant after Vaughan was excluded in Pride's Purge	
1653	Not separately represented in the Barebones Parliament	
1654–1655 (two members)	Charles Lloyd	
1654–1655 (two members)	John Pryce	
1656–1658 (two members)	Charles Lloyd	
1656–1658 (two members)	Hugh Pryce	
1659	Edward Vaughan	
1660	John Purcell	
1661	Edward Vaughan	
1661 by-election	Hon. Andrew Newport	Conservative
1679	Edward Vaughan	Conservative
1719	Hon. Price Devereux	Conservative
1740	Robert Williams	
1741	Sir Watkin Williams-Wynn	Conservative
1742	Robert Williams	
1747	Edward Kynaston	
1772	Watkin Williams	
1774	William Mostyn Owen	
1795	Francis Lloyd	
1799	Charles Williams-Wynn	Tory
1834	Charles Williams-Wynn	Conservative
1850 by-election	Herbert Williams-Wynn	Conservative
1862 by-election	Charles Williams-Wynn	Conservative
1880	Stuart Rendel	Liberal
1894 by-election	Arthur Humphreys-Owen	Liberal
1906	David Davies	Liberal
1929	Clement Davies	Liberal
1931	Clement Davies	National Liberal
1939	Clement Davies	Independent
1942	Clement Davies	Liberal
1962 by-election	Emlyn Hooson	Liberal
1979	Delwyn Williams	Conservative
1983	Alex Carlile	Liberal
1988	Alex Carlile	Liberal Democrat
1997	Lembit Öpik	Liberal Democrat
2010	Glyn Davies	Conservative
2019	Craig Williams	Conservative
2024	Constituency abolished	

== Elections ==
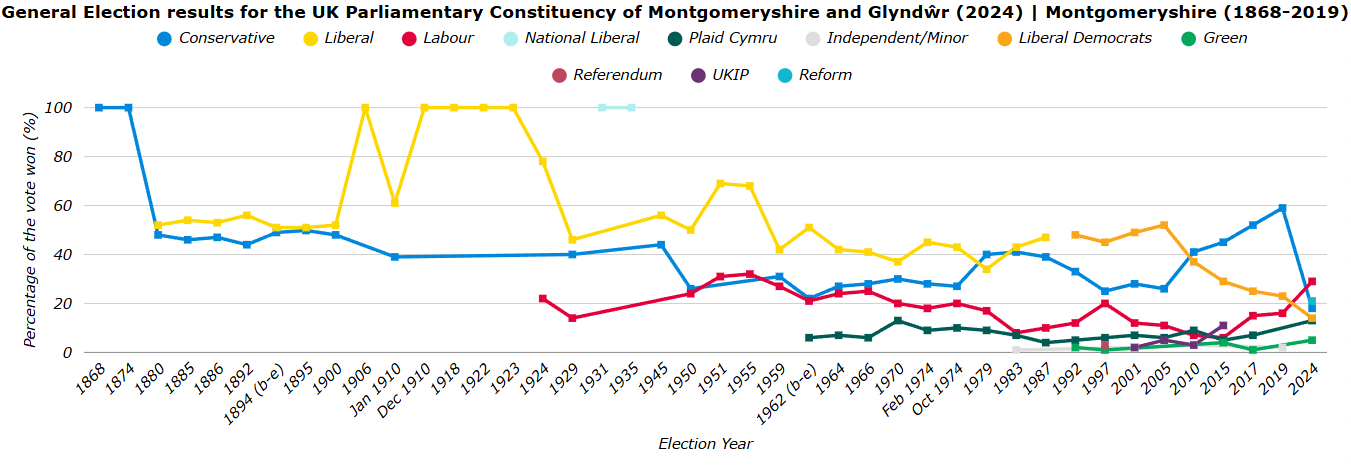
Graph to show the election results of the Montgomeryshire and Glyndŵr UK constituency and its predecessor seat. (1868-2024)

=== Elections in the 19th century ===
==== Elections in the 1830s ====
General election 1830: Montgomery
Party	Candidate	Votes	%	±%
Tory	Charles Williams-Wynn	Unopposed		
Registered electors		c. 1,110		
Tory hold				

1830 Montgomeryshire by-election
Party	Candidate	Votes	%	±%
Tory	Charles Williams-Wynn	Unopposed		
Registered electors		c. 1,110		
Tory hold				

- Caused by Williams-Wynn's appointment as a Commissioner for the Affairs of India

General election 1831: Montgomery
Party	Candidate	Votes	%	±%
Tory	Charles Williams-Wynn	703	70.0	N/A
Whig	Joseph Hayes Lyon	302	30.0	N/A
Majority		401	40.0	N/A
Turnout		1,005	c. 90.5	N/A
Registered electors		c. 1,110		
Tory hold				

General election 1832: Montgomery
Party	Candidate	Votes	%	±%
Tory	Charles Williams-Wynn	Unopposed		
Registered electors		2,525		
Tory hold				

General election 1835: Montgomery
Party	Candidate	Votes	%	±%
Conservative	Charles Williams-Wynn	Unopposed		
Registered electors		2,737		
Conservative hold				

General election 1837: Montgomery
Party	Candidate	Votes	%	±%
Conservative	Charles Williams-Wynn	Unopposed		
Registered electors		2,819		
Conservative hold				

==== Elections in the 1840s ====
General election 1841: Montgomery
Party	Candidate	Votes	%	±%
Conservative	Charles Williams-Wynn	Unopposed		
Registered electors		2,936		
Conservative hold				

General election 1847: Montgomery
Party	Candidate	Votes	%	±%
Conservative	Charles Williams-Wynn	Unopposed		
Registered electors		3,214		
Conservative hold				

==== Elections in the 1850s ====
1850 Montgomeryshire by-election
Party	Candidate	Votes	%	±%
Conservative	Herbert Watkin Williams-Wynn	Unopposed		
Conservative hold				

- Caused by Williams-Wynn's death.

General election 1852: Montgomery
Party	Candidate	Votes	%	±%
Conservative	Herbert Watkin Williams-Wynn	Unopposed		
Registered electors		2,986		
Conservative hold				

General election 1857: Montgomery
Party	Candidate	Votes	%	±%
Conservative	Herbert Watkin Williams-Wynn	Unopposed		
Registered electors		2,872		
Conservative hold				

General election 1859: Montgomery
Party	Candidate	Votes	%	±%
Conservative	Herbert Watkin Williams-Wynn	Unopposed		
Registered electors		2,723		
Conservative hold				

==== Elections in the 1860s ====
1862 Montgomeryshire by-election
Party	Candidate	Votes	%	±%
Conservative	Charles Williams-Wynn	1,269	57.0	N/A
Liberal	Sudeley Hanbury-Tracy	959	43.0	N/A
Majority		310	14.0	N/A
Turnout		2,228	83.3	N/A
Registered electors		2,675		
Conservative hold		Swing		

- Caused by Williams-Wynn's death.

General election 1865: Montgomery
Party	Candidate	Votes	%	±%
Conservative	Charles Williams-Wynn	Unopposed		
Registered electors		3,339		
Conservative hold				

General election 1868: Montgomery
Party	Candidate	Votes	%	±%
Conservative	Charles Williams-Wynn	Unopposed		
Registered electors		4,810		
Conservative hold				

==== Elections in the 1870s ====
General election 1874: Montgomery
Party	Candidate	Votes	%	±%
Conservative	Charles Williams-Wynn	Unopposed		
Registered electors		5,014		
Conservative hold				

==== Elections in the 1880s ====
General election 1880: Montgomery
Party	Candidate	Votes	%	±%
Liberal	Stuart Rendel	2,232	52.2	N/A
Conservative	Charles Williams-Wynn	2,041	47.8	N/A
Majority		191	4.4	N/A
Turnout		4,273	80.8	N/A
Registered electors		5,291		
Liberal gain from Conservative		Swing	N/A	

General election 1885: Montgomery
Party	Candidate	Votes	%	±%
Liberal	Stuart Rendel	4,044	54.4	+2.2
Conservative	Charles Williams-Wynn	3,389	45.6	−2.2
Majority		655	8.8	+4.4
Turnout		7,433	83.8	+3.0
Registered electors		8,870		
Liberal hold		Swing	+2.2	

General election 1886: Montgomery
Party	Candidate	Votes	%	±%
Liberal	Stuart Rendel	3,799	54.1	−0.3
Conservative	Devereux Herbert Mytton	3,220	45.9	+0.3
Majority		579	8.2	−0.6
Turnout		7,019	79.1	−4.7
Registered electors		8,870		
Liberal hold		Swing	-0.3	

==== Elections in the 1890s ====
General election 1892: Montgomery
Party	Candidate	Votes	%	±%
Liberal	Stuart Rendel	3,662	56.3	+2.2
Conservative	Devereux Herbert Mytton	2,847	43.7	−2.2
Majority		815	12.6	+4.4
Turnout		6,509	73.3	−5.8
Registered electors		8,880		
Liberal hold		Swing	+2.2	

1894 Montgomeryshire by-election
Party	Candidate	Votes	%	±%
Liberal	Arthur Humphreys-Owen	3,440	51.7	−4.6
Conservative	Watkin Williams-Wynn	3,215	48.3	+4.6
Majority		225	3.4	−9.2
Turnout		6,655	82.2	+8.9
Registered electors		8,092		
Liberal hold		Swing	-4.6	

- Caused by Rendel's elevation to the peerage.

General election 1895: Montgomery
Party	Candidate	Votes	%	±%
Liberal	Arthur Humphreys-Owen	3,442	50.2	−6.1
Conservative	Watkin Williams-Wynn	3,415	49.8	+6.1
Majority		27	0.4	−12.2
Turnout		6,857	85.8	+12.5
Registered electors		7,989		
Liberal hold		Swing	-6.1	

=== Elections in the 20th century ===
==== Elections in the 1900s ====
Humphreys-Owen

General election 1900: Montgomery
Party	Candidate	Votes	%	±%
Liberal	Arthur Humphreys-Owen	3,482	52.0	+1.8
Conservative	Watkin Williams-Wynn	3,218	48.0	−1.8
Majority		264	4.0	+3.6
Turnout		6,700	84.6	−1.2
Registered electors		7,915		
Liberal hold		Swing	+1.8	

David Davies

General election 1906: Montgomery
Party	Candidate	Votes	%	±%
Liberal	David Davies	Unopposed		
Registered electors				
Liberal hold				

==== Elections in the 1910s ====
General election January 1910: Montgomery
Party	Candidate	Votes	%	±%
Liberal	David Davies	4,369	61.8	N/A
Conservative	Arthur Williams-Wynn	2,697	38.2	N/A
Majority		1,672	23.6	N/A
Turnout		7,066	89.1	N/A
Registered electors		7,928		
Liberal hold		Swing	N/A	

General election December 1910: Montgomery
Party	Candidate	Votes	%	±%
Liberal	David Davies	Unopposed		
Registered electors		7,928		
Liberal hold				

General election 1918: Montgomery
Party	Candidate	Votes	%	±%
Liberal	David Davies	Unopposed		
Registered electors		24,949		
Liberal hold				

- Davies was endorsed by the Coalition Government, but refused to accept the coupon.

==== Elections in the 1920s ====
General election 1922: Montgomery
Party	Candidate	Votes	%	±%
Liberal	David Davies	Unopposed		
Registered electors		23,802		
Liberal hold				

General election 1923: Montgomery
Party	Candidate	Votes	%	±%
Liberal	David Davies	Unopposed		
Registered electors		24,126		
Liberal hold				

General election 1924: Montgomery
Party	Candidate	Votes	%	±%
Liberal	David Davies	14,942	77.3	N/A
Labour	Arthur Davies	4,384	22.7	N/A
Majority		10,558	54.6	N/A
Turnout		19,326	79.4	N/A
Registered electors		24,338		
Liberal hold		Swing	N/A	

General election 1929: Montgomery
Party	Candidate	Votes	%	±%
Liberal	Clement Davies	12,779	46.5	−30.8
Unionist	John Murray Naylor	10,651	38.7	N/A
Labour	John Evans	4,069	14.8	−7.9
Majority		2,128	7.8	−46.8
Turnout		27,499	88.3	+8.9
Registered electors		31,142		
Liberal hold		Swing	-11.4	

==== Elections in the 1930s ====
General election 1931: Montgomery
Party	Candidate	Votes	%	±%
National Liberal	Clement Davies	Unopposed		
Registered electors		30,120		
National Liberal hold				

General election 1935: Montgomery
Party	Candidate	Votes	%	±%
National Liberal	Clement Davies	Unopposed		
Registered electors		30,943		
National Liberal hold				

==== Elections in the 1940s ====
General election 1945: Montgomery
Party	Candidate	Votes	%	±%
Liberal	Clement Davies	14,018	56.3	N/A
Conservative	Philip Owen	10,895	43.7	N/A
Majority		3,123	13.6	N/A
Turnout		24,913	77.4	N/A
Registered electors		32,180		
Liberal gain from National Liberal		Swing	N/A	

==== Elections in the 1950s ====
General election 1950: Montgomery
Party	Candidate	Votes	%	±%
Liberal	Clement Davies	14,401	50.0	−6.3
Conservative	Harry West	7,621	26.5	−17.2
Labour	John David Williams	6,760	23.5	N/A
Majority		6,780	23.5	+9.9
Turnout		28,782	88.9	+11.5
Registered electors		32,372		
Liberal hold		Swing		

General election 1951: Montgomery
Party	Candidate	Votes	%	±%
Liberal	Clement Davies	17,075	68.5	+18.5
Labour	David Caradog Jones	7,854	31.5	+8.0
Majority		9,221	37.0	+13.5
Turnout		24,929	76.9	−12.0
Registered electors		32,423		
Liberal hold		Swing		

General election 1955: Montgomery
Party	Candidate	Votes	%	±%
Liberal	Clement Davies	16,021	68.0	−0.5
Labour	David Caradog Jones	7,521	32.0	+0.5
Majority		8,500	36.0	−1.0
Turnout		23,542	73.6	−3.3
Registered electors		31,983		
Liberal hold		Swing	-0.5	

General election 1959: Montgomery
Party	Candidate	Votes	%	±%
Liberal	Clement Davies	10,970	42.0	−26.0
Conservative	Frank Leslie Morgan	8,176	31.3	N/A
Labour	David Caradog Jones	6,950	26.6	−5.4
Majority		2,794	10.7	−25.3
Turnout		26,096	83.8	+10.2
Registered electors		31,152		
Liberal hold		Swing		

==== Elections in the 1960s ====
1962 Montgomeryshire by-election
Party	Candidate	Votes	%	±%
Liberal	Emlyn Hooson	13,181	51.3	+9.3
Conservative	Robert H. Dawson	5,632	21.9	−9.4
Labour	Tudor Davies	5,299	20.6	−6.0
Plaid Cymru	Islwyn Ffowc Elis	1,594	6.2	N/A
Majority		7,549	29.4	+18.7
Turnout		25,706	85.1	+1.3
Registered electors		30,202		
Liberal hold		Swing		

General election 1964: Montgomery
Party	Candidate	Votes	%	±%
Liberal	Emlyn Hooson	10,738	42.3	+0.3
Conservative	Jerry Wiggin	6,768	26.7	−4.6
Labour	Gwyn M. Evans	5,696	22.5	−4.1
Plaid Cymru	Islwyn Ffowc Elis	2,167	8.5	N/A
Majority		3,970	15.6	+4.9
Turnout		25,369	84.1	+0.3
Registered electors		30,155		
Liberal hold		Swing		

General election 1966: Montgomery
Party	Candidate	Votes	%	±%
Liberal	Emlyn Hooson	10,278	41.5	−0.8
Conservative	Jerry Wiggin	6,784	27.4	+0.7
Labour	Gwyn M. Evans	5,891	23.8	+1.3
Plaid Cymru	Trefor Edwards	1,841	7.4	−1.1
Majority		3,494	14.1	−1.5
Turnout		24,794	82.8	−1.3
Registered electors		29,951		
Liberal hold		Swing		

==== Elections in the 1970s ====
General election 1970: Montgomery
Party	Candidate	Votes	%	±%
Liberal	Emlyn Hooson	10,202	38.4	−3.1
Conservative	Delwyn Williams	7,891	29.7	+2.3
Labour	David W. Thomas	5,335	20.1	−3.7
Plaid Cymru	Edward Millward	3,145	11.8	+4.4
Majority		2,311	8.7	−5.4
Turnout		26,573	82.3	−0.5
Registered electors		32,304		
Liberal hold		Swing		

General election February 1974: Montgomery
Party	Candidate	Votes	%	±%
Liberal	Emlyn Hooson	12,495	45.4	+7.0
Conservative	W R C Williams-Wynne	7,844	28.5	−1.2
Labour	P W Harries	4,888	17.8	−2.3
Plaid Cymru	A P Jones	2,274	8.3	−3.5
Majority		4,651	16.9	+8.2
Turnout		27,501	82.6	+0.3
Registered electors		33,303		
Liberal hold		Swing		

General election October 1974: Montgomery
Party	Candidate	Votes	%	±%
Liberal	Emlyn Hooson	11,280	43.1	−2.3
Conservative	W R C Williams-Wynne	7,421	28.4	−0.1
Labour	P W Harries	5,031	19.2	+1.4
Plaid Cymru	A P Jones	2,440	9.3	+1.0
Majority		3,859	14.7	−2.2
Turnout		26,172	77.9	−4.7
Registered electors		33,583		
Liberal hold		Swing		

General election 1979: Montgomery
Party	Candidate	Votes	%	±%
Conservative	Delwyn Williams	11,751	40.3	+11.9
Liberal	Emlyn Hooson	10,158	34.9	−8.2
Labour	J Price	4,751	16.3	−2.9
Plaid Cymru	Carl Clowes	2,474	8.5	−0.8
Majority		1,593	5.4	N/A
Turnout		29,134	81.4	+1.5
Registered electors		35,786		
Conservative gain from Liberal		Swing		

==== Elections in the 1980s ====
General election 1983: Montgomery
Party	Candidate	Votes	%	±%
Liberal	Alex Carlile	12,863	43.3	+8.4
Conservative	Delwyn Williams	12,195	41.1	+0.8
Labour	Joe Wilson	2,550	8.6	−7.7
Plaid Cymru	Carl Clowes	1,585	5.3	−3.2
Independent	David Rowlands	487	1.6	N/A
Majority		668	2.2	N/A
Turnout		29,680	79.2	−2.2
Registered electors		37,474		
Liberal gain from Conservative		Swing		

In 1983 this was Labour's worst performance in Wales and the only seat where Labour won less than 12.5% and lost their £150 deposit. The threshold for retaining deposits was lowered to 5% in 1985.

General election 1987: Montgomery
Party	Candidate	Votes	%	±%
Liberal	Alex Carlile	14,729	46.6	+3.3
Conservative	David Evans	12,171	38.5	−2.6
Labour	Edward Llewellyn-Jones	3,304	10.5	+1.9
Plaid Cymru	Carl Clowes	1,412	4.5	−0.8
Majority		2,558	8.1	+5.9
Turnout		31,616	79.4	+0.2
Registered electors		39,808		
Liberal hold		Swing		

==== Elections in the 1990s ====
General election 1992: Montgomery
Party	Candidate	Votes	%	±%
Liberal Democrats	Alex Carlile	16,031	48.5	+1.9
Conservative	Jeannie France-Hayhurst	10,822	32.7	−5.8
Labour	Stephen Wood	4,115	12.4	+1.9
Plaid Cymru	Hugh Parsons	1,581	4.8	+0.3
Green	Patrick Adams	508	1.5	N/A
Majority		5,209	15.8	+7.7
Turnout		33,057	79.9	+0.5
Registered electors		41,386		
Liberal Democrats hold		Swing		

General election 1997: Montgomeryshire
Party	Candidate	Votes	%	±%
Liberal Democrats	Lembit Öpik	14,647	45.9	−2.6
Conservative	Glyn Davies	8,344	26.1	−6.6
Labour	Angharad Davies	6,109	19.1	+6.7
Plaid Cymru	Helen Mary Jones	1,608	5.0	+0.2
Referendum	John Bufton	879	2.8	N/A
Green	Susan Walker	338	1.1	−0.4
Majority		6,303	19.8	+4.0
Turnout		31,925	74.7	−5.2
Registered electors		60,873		
Liberal Democrats hold		Swing	+2.0	

=== Elections in the 21st century ===
==== Elections in the 2000s ====
General election 2001: Montgomeryshire
Party	Candidate	Votes	%	±%
Liberal Democrats	Lembit Öpik	14,319	49.4	+3.5
Conservative	David Jones	8,085	27.9	+1.8
Labour	Paul Davies	3,443	11.9	−7.2
Plaid Cymru	David Senior	1,969	6.8	+1.8
UKIP	David Rowlands^{1}	786	2.7	N/A
ProLife Alliance	Ruth Davies	210	0.7	N/A
Independent	Reginald Taylor	171	0.6	N/A
Majority		6,234	21.5	+1.7
Turnout		28,983	65.5	−9.2
Registered electors		62,200		
Liberal Democrats hold		Swing	+0.9	

^{1} This is the same David Rowlands who contested Montgomeryshire as an Independent in 1983. Not the similarly named David Rowlands who contested Monmouth at the same election.

General election 2005: Montgomeryshire
Party	Candidate	Votes	%	±%
Liberal Democrats	Lembit Öpik	15,419	51.2	+1.8
Conservative	Simon Baynes	8,246	27.4	−0.5
Labour	David Tinline	3,454	11.5	−0.4
Plaid Cymru	Ellen ap Gwynn	2,078	6.9	+0.1
UKIP	Clive Easton	900	3.0	+0.3
Majority		7,173	23.8	+2.3
Turnout		30,097	64.4	−1.1
Registered electors		46,766		
Liberal Democrats hold		Swing	+1.2	

==== Elections in the 2010s ====
General election 2010: Montgomeryshire
Party	Candidate	Votes	%	±%
Conservative	Glyn Davies	13,976	41.3	+13.8
Liberal Democrats	Lembit Öpik	12,792	37.8	−13.4
Plaid Cymru	Heledd Fychan	2,802	8.3	+1.3
Labour	Nick Colbourne	2,407	7.1	−5.2
UKIP	David W. L. Rowlands^{1}	1,128	3.3	+0.4
National Front	Milton Ellis	384	1.1	N/A
Independent	Bruce Lawson	324	1.0	N/A
Majority		1,184	3.5	N/A
Turnout		33,813	69.4	+3.1
Registered electors		48,730		
Conservative gain from Liberal Democrats		Swing	+13.2	

^{1} The David Rowlands who stood here is different from the David Rowlands who stood in Newport East at this election for UKIP.

General election 2015: Montgomeryshire
Party	Candidate	Votes	%	±%
Conservative	Glyn Davies	15,204	45.0	+3.7
Liberal Democrats	Jane Dodds	9,879	29.3	−8.5
UKIP	Des Parkinson	3,769	11.2	+7.9
Labour	Martyn Singleton	1,900	5.6	−1.5
Plaid Cymru	Ann Griffith	1,745	5.2	−3.1
Green	Richard Chaloner	1,260	3.7	N/A
Majority		5,325	15.7	+12.2
Turnout		33,757	69.3	−0.1
Registered electors		48,690		
Conservative hold		Swing	+6.2	

General election 2017: Montgomeryshire
Party	Candidate	Votes	%	±%
Conservative	Glyn Davies	18,075	51.8	+6.8
Liberal Democrats	Jane Dodds	8,790	25.2	−4.1
Labour	Iwan Wyn Jones	5,542	15.9	+10.3
Plaid Cymru	Aled Morgan Hughes	1,960	5.6	+0.4
Green	Richard Chaloner	524	1.5	−2.2
Majority		9,285	26.6	+10.9
Turnout		34,891	70.1	+0.8
Registered electors		50,755		
Conservative hold		Swing	+5.5	

General election 2019: Montgomeryshire
Party	Candidate	Votes	%	±%
Conservative	Craig Williams	20,020	58.5	+6.7
Liberal Democrats	Kishan Devani	7,882	23.0	−2.2
Labour	Kait Duerden	5,585	16.3	+0.4
Gwlad Gwlad	Gwyn Evans	727	2.1	N/A
Rejected ballots		213		
Majority		12,138	35.5	+8.9
Turnout		34,214	69.8	−0.3
Registered electors		48,997		
Conservative hold		Swing	+4.4	

Of the 213 rejected ballots:

- 156 were either unmarked or it was uncertain who the vote was for.
- 24 voted for more than one candidate.
- 33 had want of official mark.

== See also ==
- Montgomeryshire (Senedd constituency)
- List of parliamentary constituencies in Powys
- 1962 Montgomeryshire by-election
- List of parliamentary constituencies in Wales
