= Nant Gwrtheyrn =

Welsh language and heritage centre

Coordinates: 52.9756°N 4.4586°W

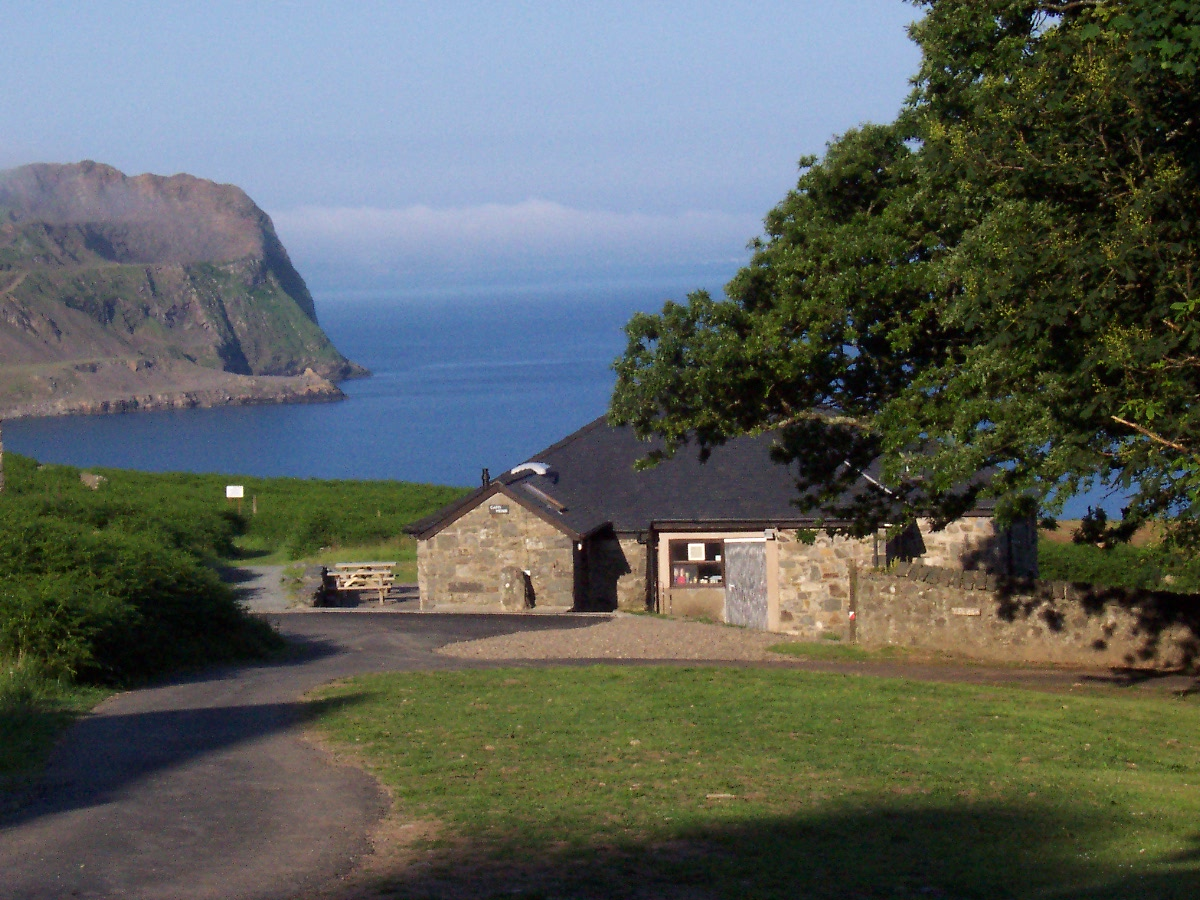
Approach to Nant Gwrtheyrn.

Nant Gwrtheyrn is a Welsh language and heritage centre, located near the village of Llithfaen on the northern coast of the Llŷn Peninsula, Gwynedd, in northwest Wales.

The centre takes its name from the valley in which it is located, Nant Gwrtheyrn ("Vortigern's stream"), which lies in isolation by the sea at the foot of Yr Eifl. It is sometimes referred to as "the Nant". The centre is built within the structures of the former quarrying village Porth y Nant, which was abandoned midway through World War II after the cessation of quarrying.

== History ==
The quarry named Nant Gwrtheyrn opened in 1861, and was serviced by a village called Porth y Nant, on the site of the current language centre. Nant Gwrtheyrn produced setts, stone blocks used for road surfacing. The community lived an isolated existence, with product shipped and goods shipped out mainly via the Irish Sea, resulting in limited contact with the outside world.

The quarry closed early in World War II, partly due to a drop in demand and also to transport difficulties. The hillsides of the Nant, through their landscape scars and the ruins of quarry structures, testify to this former existence.

After the quarry was closed, the community dispersed and the cottages fell into disrepair. Occupied by hippies for a time during the 1960s, the site was the subject of several plans for redevelopment, including as an approved school, when it was acquired by a local trust, led by Dr. Carl Clowes who set it up to establish a Welsh language centre.

There followed a £5 million redevelopment, including £3.8 million of European and Welsh government grants, to create a new Welsh language centre, including a heritage centre, conference facilities and 4-star accommodation. It was officially opened by Wales' First Minister, Carwyn Jones, in March 2011.

The BBC Radio 4 programme Any Questions? was broadcast from Nant Gwrtheyrn on 15 February 2019. It included a question asked in Welsh.

== Language centre ==
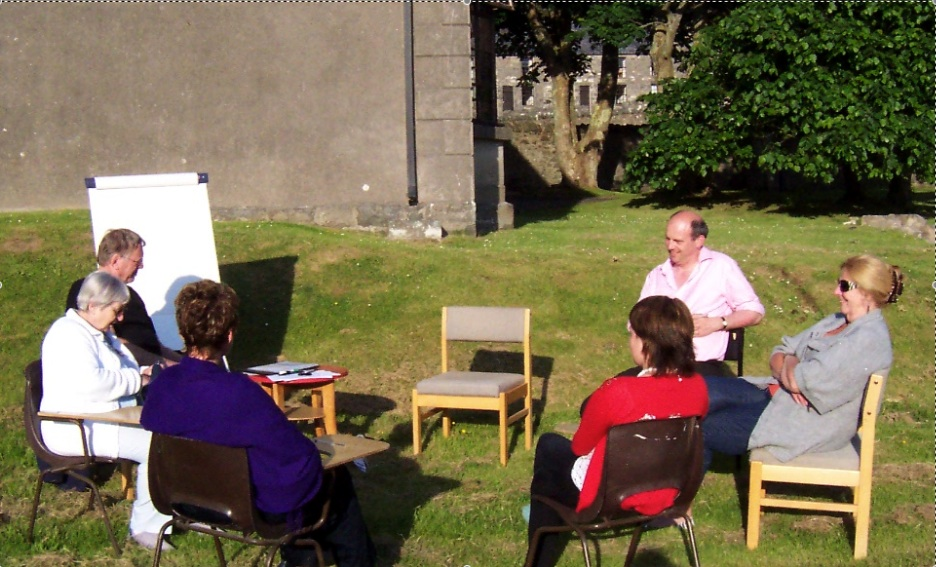
An outdoor language class.

The centre specialises in courses for adults who want to learn Welsh as an additional language. Courses are held throughout the year at a variety of levels from absolute beginner up to Higher and Proficiency levels, with learners' weekends and other activities to strengthen understanding. Course participants usually are offered one or two cultural experiences as well as formal teaching. Accommodation for students is available in the village, which consists of two terraces of former workmen's cottages, Trem y Môr (Sea View) and Trem y Mynydd (Mountain View).

The centre is used in addition for weddings and conferences, and as a residential site for Writing students at Liverpool John Moores University. The countryside surrounding Nant Gwrtheyrn is known for its outstanding natural beauty, and frequented for this by writers and photographers.

== Landscape ==
The nearby beach can be seen from the village and it is accessible via an unpaved path. The views take in Porth Dinllaen and on a clear day South Stack lighthouse on Anglesey can be seen.

== Access and transport ==
The remote character of the centre means that it is difficult to access. The original road down into the village was an unpaved single-track road with unprotected edges, no passing places, 6 hairpin corners and a maximum gradient of 1 in 2½: totally unsuitable for ordinary cars, for nervous or inexperienced drivers, or for bad weather conditions. Known as "Screw Hill", it was for time to time used as a motor sporting venue. British Pathé characterised driving up the road as "Climbing the Unclimbable" and filmed a car successfully ascending it. The road was realigned and improved in 2007. Although still single-track, it is now paved and has passing places, crash barriers protecting the edges, 2 hairpin corners and a gradient of 1 in 4.

The nearest bus stop is in the nearby village of Llithfaen, and the nearest rail stations are in Pwllheli and Bangor. Walking to the centre from the top of the valley is also possible, but the walk down can take over forty minutes, while the strenuous walk up can take over an hour.
