= Edward Herbert, 1st Baron Herbert of Cherbury =

English soldier and poet (1583–1648)

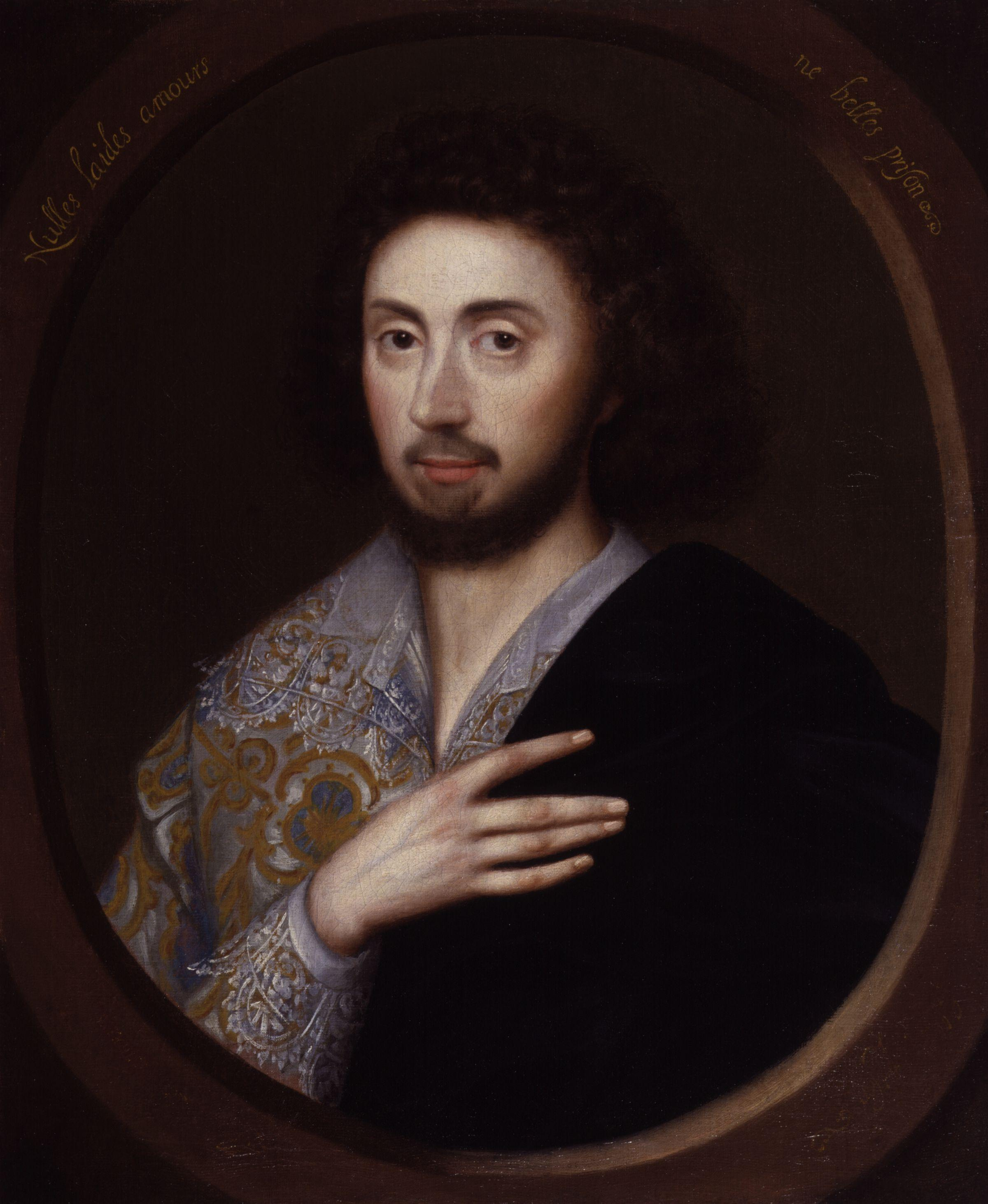
Portrait of Edward Herbert by Isaac Oliver, c. 1603–05

Edward Herbert, 1st Baron Herbert of Cherbury (or Chirbury) KB (3 March 1583 – 5 August 1648) was an English soldier, diplomat, historian, poet and religious philosopher.

He studied multiple languages and disciplines at University College, Oxford, and began his political career in Parliament, representing the Welsh counties Montgomeryshire and Merioneth.

As a soldier, Herbert distinguished himself in the Low Countries, serving under the Prince of Orange. His diplomatic career was most active in Paris, where he aimed to arrange a marriage between Charles, Prince of Wales, and Henrietta Maria, which took place in 1625.

Herbert was granted an Irish peerage as the Baron Herbert of Castle Island in 1624, followed by an English barony in 1629. During the English Civil War, he took a neutral stance, retiring to Montgomery Castle which he surrendered to Parliament.

Herbert is most renowned for his work in philosophy, particularly his treatise De Veritate which positioned him as the "father of English Deism". This seminal work distinguishes truth from revelation, probability, possibility, and falsehood. Other significant works include the De religione gentilium, a pioneering work on comparative religion, and Expeditio Buckinghami ducis, a defence of the Duke of Buckingham's actions in 1627.

Herbert also produced a body of poems, showing his prowess as a faithful disciple of John Donne, and his autobiography provides a lively account of his life up until 1624.

== Life ==
=== Early life ===
Edward Herbert was the eldest son of Richard Herbert of Montgomery Castle (a member of a collateral branch of the family of the Earls of Pembroke) and of Magdalen, daughter of Sir Richard Newport, and brother of the poet George Herbert. He was born within England at Eyton-on-Severn near Wroxeter, Shropshire. After private tuition, he matriculated at University College, Oxford, as a gentleman commoner, in May 1596. On 28 February 1599, at the age of 15, he married his cousin Mary, then aged 21, ("notwithstanding the disparity of years betwixt us"), who was daughter and heiress of Sir William Herbert (d. 1593). He returned to Oxford with his wife and mother, continued his studies, and learned French, Italian and Spanish, as well as music, riding and fencing. During this period, before he was 21, he started a family.

Herbert entered Parliament as knight of the shire for Montgomeryshire in 1601. On the accession of King James I he presented himself at court and was created a Knight of the Bath on 24 July 1603. From 1604 to 1611 he was Member of Parliament for Merioneth. From 1605 he was magistrate and appointed sheriff of Montgomeryshire for 1605.

=== Soldier ===
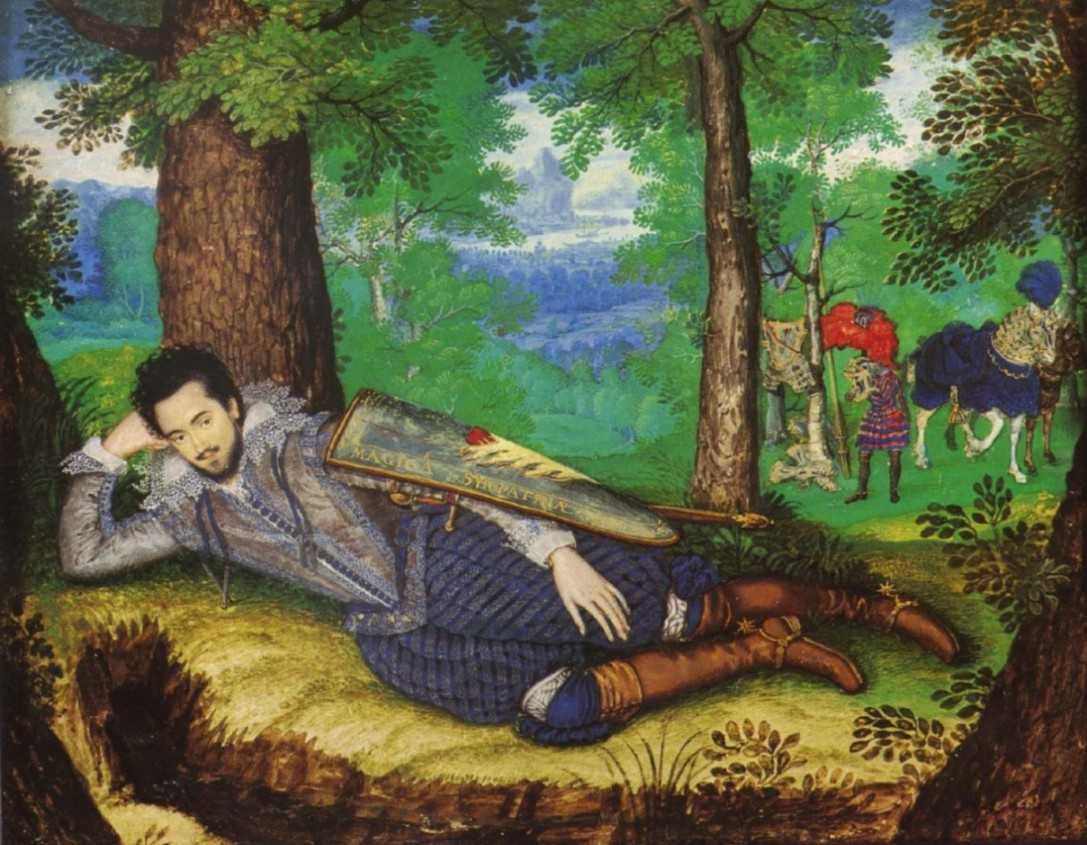
Edward Herbert, miniature portrait c. 1613–1614 by Isaac Oliver, now in Powis Castle

In 1608, Edward Herbert went to Paris, with Aurelian Townshend, enjoying the friendship and hospitality of the old Constable de Montmorency at Merlou and meeting King Henry IV; he lodged for many months with Isaac Casaubon. On his return, as he wrote of himself, he was "in great esteem both in court and city, many of the greatest desiring my company". At this period he was close to both Ben Jonson and John Donne, and in Jonson's Epicoene, or the Silent Woman Herbert is probably alluded to. Both Donne and Jonson honoured him in poetry. In December 1609 he fought with a Scottish usher at Greenwich Palace who had snatched a ribbon from Mary Middlemore's hair, and if the Privy Council had not prevented it, would have fought a duel in Hyde Park.

In 1610 Herbert served as a volunteer in the Low Countries under the Prince of Orange, whose intimate friend he became, and distinguished himself at the capture of Juliers from the Holy Roman Emperor. He offered to decide the war by engaging in single combat with a champion chosen from among the enemy, but his challenge was declined. Back in England in 1611 he survived an assault in London by Sir John Eyre who accused him of having an affair with his wife Dorothy. He paid a visit to Spinola, in the Spanish camp near Wezel, and afterwards to the elector palatine at Heidelberg, subsequently travelling in Italy. At the instance of the Duke of Savoy he led an expedition of 4,000 Huguenots from Languedoc into Piedmont to help the Savoyards against Spain, but after nearly losing his life in the journey to Lyon he was imprisoned on his arrival there, and the enterprise came to nothing. Thence he returned to the Netherlands and the Prince of Orange, arriving in England in 1617.

=== Diplomat ===
In 1619, Herbert was made ambassador to Paris, taking in his entourage Thomas Carew. He became involved with the case of Piero Hugon who had stolen jewels belonging to Anne of Denmark. A quarrel with de Luynes and a challenge sent by him to the latter occasioned his recall in 1621. After the death of de Luynes, Herbert resumed his post in February 1622.

He was popular at the French court and showed considerable diplomatic ability. His chief objects were to accomplish the marriage between Charles, Prince of Wales and Henrietta Maria, and to secure the assistance of Louis XIII for Frederick V, Elector Palatine. He failed in the latter, and was dismissed in April 1624.

Herbert returned home greatly in debt and received little reward for his services beyond the Irish peerage of Baron Herbert of Castle Island on 31 May 1624 and the English barony of Herbert of Cherbury, or Chirbury, on 7 May 1629.

=== Later life ===
In 1632, Herbert was appointed a member of the council of war. He attended the king at York during the First Bishops' War with Scotland in 1639, and in May 1642 was imprisoned by the parliament for urging in the House of Lords the addition of the words "without cause" to the resolution that the king violated his coronation oath by making war on parliament. He determined after this to take no further part in the struggle that became the English Civil War, retired to Montgomery Castle, and declined the king's summons to Shrewsbury, pleading ill-health.

On 5 September 1644 he surrendered the castle, by negotiation, to the Parliamentary forces led by Sir Thomas Myddelton. He returned to London, submitted, and was granted a pension of £20 a week. In 1647 he paid a visit to Pierre Gassendi at Paris, and died in London the following summer, aged 65, being buried in the church of St Giles in the Fields.

=== Family ===
Herbert left two sons, Richard (c. 1600 – 1655), who succeeded him as 2nd Lord Herbert of Cherbury, and Edward. Richard's sons, Edward Herbert (died 1678) and Henry Herbert (died 1691), each succeeded to the title, after which it became extinct. It was revived in 1694 when Henry Herbert (1654–1709), son of Sir Henry Herbert (1594–1673), last surviving brother of the 1st Lord Herbert, was created Lord Herbert of Cherbury. Lord Herbert's cousin and namesake, Sir Edward Herbert, was also a prominent figure in the English Civil War.

== De Veritate ==
Herbert's major work is the De Veritate, prout distinguitur a revelatione, a verisimili, a possibili, et a falso (On Truth, as It Is Distinguished from Revelation, the Probable, the Possible, and the False). He published it on the advice of Grotius.

In the De Veritate, Herbert produced the first purely metaphysical treatise, written by an Englishman. Herbert's real claim to fame is as "the father of English Deism". Herbert's common notions of religion are the famous five articles, which became the charter of the English deists. Charles Blount, in particular, acted as a publicist for Herbert's idea.

De Veritate has been placed on the index of forbidden books of the Catholic Church.

Five Articles (Herbert's Common Notions of Religion)

- That God exists;
- That God ought to be worshipped;
- That virtue must be a chief part of that worship;
- That you must repent of all wickedness; and
- You will face reward or punishment in the afterlife depending on how you lived your life.

== Other works ==
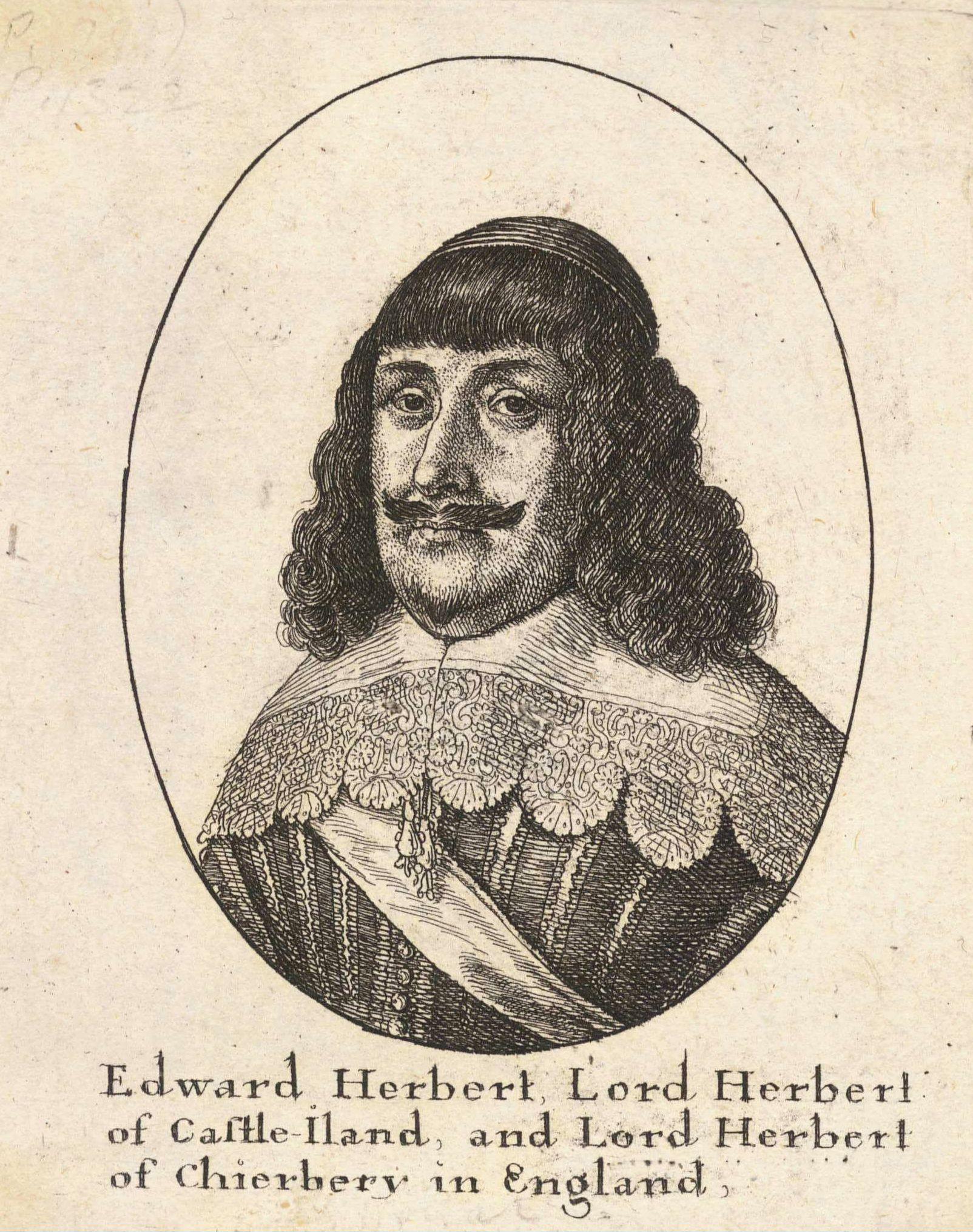
Lord Herbert of Cherbury by Wenceslaus Hollar

The De religione gentilium was a posthumously published work, influenced by the De theologia gentili of Gerardus Vossius, and seen into print by Isaac Vossius. It is an early work on comparative religion, and gives, in David Hume's words, "a natural history of religion." It is also to some extent dependent on the De dis Syris of John Selden, and the Quaestiones celeberrimae in Genesim of Marin Mersenne. By examining pagan religions Herbert finds the universality of his five great articles, and that these are clearly recognisable. The same vein is maintained in the tracts De causis errorum, an unfinished work on logical fallacies, Religio laici, and Ad sacerdotes de religione laici (1645).

Herbert's first historical work was the Expedition Buckinghami ducis, a defence of the Duke of Buckingham's conduct on the La Rochelle expedition of 1627. The Life and Raigne of King Henry VIII (1649) is considered good for its period, but hampered by limited sources.

His poems, published in 1665 (reprinted and edited by John Churton Collins in 1881), show him in general a faithful disciple of Donne. His satires are poor, but a few of his lyrical verses show power of reflection and true inspiration, while his use of the metre afterwards employed by Tennyson in his "In Memoriam" is particularly happy and effective. His Neo-Latin poems are evidence of his scholarship. Three of these had appeared together with the De causis errorum in 1645.

To these works must be added A Dialogue between a Tutor and a Pupil, which is of disputed authenticity; and a treatise on the king's supremacy in the Church (manuscript in the Record Office and at the Queen's College, Oxford). His autobiography, first published by Horace Walpole in 1764, a naïve and amusing narrative, is much occupied with his duels and amorous adventures, and breaks off in 1624. Missing from it are his friendships and the diplomatic side of his embassy in France, in relation to which he described only the splendour of his retinue and his social triumphs.

He was a lutenist, and his collection Lord Herbert of Cherbury's Lute-Book survives in manuscript. His own compositions, in all four preludes, four pavans and a courante, are conservative in style, showing little influence from the works of the French school that appear in his collection. According to the polymath Samuel Hartlib, he also composed 'some Excellent pieces for the Viole da Gamba' but these are not extant. Hartlib recorded in his Ephemerides that these pieces were composed "Ex intimis Matheseos fundamentis" from which Herbert derived "Rules" for composition, suggesting that Herbert was writing music derived from the mathesis universalis.

Herbert was also the author of an unfinished play, 'The Amazon', the working draft of which was rediscovered in 2009. The play was probably written while he was completing De Veritate during his terms as English ambassador to France, 1619–21 and 1622–4.

== Views of prayer ==
Joseph Waligore, in his article "The Piety of the English Deists" has shown that Herbert was one of the most pious of the deists, as he fervently prayed to God and believed God gave signs in answer to our prayers. He was so sure God answered our prayers that he said prayer was an idea God put into every human. He said that:

every religion believes that the Deity can hear and answer prayers; and we are bound to assume a special Providence—to omit other sources of proof—from the universal testimony of the sense of divine assistance in times of distress.

For Herbert, this universal testimony of God answering our prayers meant that it was a common notion or something engraved into our heart by God.

Herbert was speaking from experience. In his autobiography, Herbert said he once prayed for and received a divine sign. He had written De Veritate and was wondering whether he should publish it. So he got down on his knees and prayed fervently to God for a sign instructing him what to do. Even though it was a clear, sunny day with no wind, Herbert said he heard a gentle noise in the clear sky that so comforted him that he decided it was a sign from God that he should publish his book. Herbert wrote:

Being thus doubtful in my Chamber, one fair day in the Summer, my Casement being opened towards the South, the Sun shining clear and no Wind stirring, I took my book, De Veritate, in my hand, and, kneeling on my Knees, devoutly said these words: "O Thou Eternal God, Author of the Light which now shines upon me, and Giver of all inward Illuminations, I do beseech Thee, of Thy infinite Goodness, to pardon a greater Request than a Sinner ought to make; I am not satisfied enough whether I shall publish this Book, De Veritate; if it be for Thy glory, I beseech Thee give me some Sign from Heaven, if not, I shall suppress it." I had no sooner spoken these words, but a loud 'tho yet gentle Noise came from the Heavens (for it was like nothing on Earth) which did so comfort and cheer me, that I took my Petition as granted, and that I had the Sign I demanded, whereupon also I resolved to print my Book.

Herbert was attacked by orthodox Protestant ministers of the eighteenth century as a religious enthusiast. One minister, John Brown, said his claim to have received a sign from God was "enthusiastic". Another minister, John Leland, said even asking for such a sign was improper, as God does not become involved like that in people's lives. Leland said that Herbert's claim "passed for a high fit of enthusiasm. ... I think it maybe justly doubted, whether an address of such a particular kind, as that made by his Lordship, was proper or regular. It does not seem to me, that we are well-founded to apply for or to expect an extraordinary sign from heaven."

Modern scholars of deism often have difficulty fitting Herbert's religious views into their scheme of what deists believed. For example, Peter Gay said that Herbert—who lived in the early seventeenth century—was atypical of the later deists because Herbert thought he had received a divine sign but Waligore argues that instead of saying Herbert was not a deist, we should change our notions about the deists and their relationship to God through prayer.

Besides believing in prayers and divine signs, Herbert also believed in miracles, revelation, and direct divine inspiration. Herbert was so sure God performed miracles that he thought this doctrine, and the related notion that God answered our prayers, was an idea God put into every human. Herbert said his emphasis on natural religion did not mean revelation was superfluous. He said he thought the Bible was a "surer source of consolation and support" than any other book and reading it stirred "the whole inner man" to life. Herbert thought that divine inspiration generally happened through "the medium of spirits ... variously called angels, demons, intelligences and geniuses". He said that we could be sure we had divine inspiration if we prepared ourselves for it and it met certain conditions. To begin with, said Herbert, "we must employ prayers, vows, faith and every faculty which can be used to invoke" the divine. Then "the breath of the Divine Spirit must be immediately felt" and the recommended course of action must be good. When these conditions were met, "and we feel the Divine guidance in our activities, we must recognise with reverence the good will of God".

== Editions and translations ==
- Hauptwerke (Main Works): anastatic reprint edited in three volumes by Günter Gawlick, Stuttgart / Bad Cannstatt: Frommann-Holzboog, 1966–1971.
- 1. De veritate (Editio tertia), De causis errorum, De religione laici, Parerga. (London 1645).
- 2. De religione gentilium errorumque apud eos causis. (Amsterdam 1663).
- 3. A dialogue between a tutor and his pupil. (Amsterdam 1768).
- De Veritate, English translation by Meyrick H. Carré (University of Bristol, 1937); facsimile reprint: Thoemmes Continuum (1992) ISBN 1-85506-126-0.

== Notes ==
Peerage of Ireland
New creation	Baron Herbert of Castle Island; 1624–1648	Succeeded by Richard Herbert
Peerage of England
New creation	Baron Herbert of Chirbury; 1629–1648	Succeeded by Richard Herbert
