= Elizabeth O'Brien, Countess of Inchiquin =

English noblewoman

The Right Honourable The Countess of Inchiquin
- Born: Hon. Elizabeth Brydges; 1651
- Died: 3 February 1718 (aged 66–67)
- Spouses: Edward Herbert, 3rd Baron Herbert of Chirbury (m. 1673; died 1678) William O'Brien, 2nd Earl of Inchiquin (m. 1684; died 1692) Charles Howard, 4th Baron Howard of Escrick (m. 1694, divorced)
- Parent(s): George Brydges, 6th Baron Chandos; Lady Susan Montagu

Elizabeth O'Brien, Countess of Inchiquin (25 March 1651 (date baptised) – 3 February 1718) was an English noblewoman who made three notable marriages.

== Early life ==
She was the youngest daughter and co-heir of George Brydges, 6th Baron Chandos, and his first wife, the former Lady Susan Montagu (a daughter of the Earl of Manchester). She was described by a contemporary as "a great beauty of £10,000". Elizabeth's elder sister, Margaret, married William Brownlow of Hunby. Her father died of smallpox, aged 35, in February 1654.

== Personal life ==
Her first husband, whom she married on 20 August 1673, was Edward Herbert, 3rd Baron Herbert of Chirbury; she was his second wife and around 18 years his junior. Herbert had been involved in Booth's Rebellion of 1659, and earned favour with the new king, Charles II of England, following the Restoration of the Monarchy, holding the position of Custos Rotulorum of Denbighshire until his death in 1678. In the course of their marriage, Herbert built a new home at Lymore Park, which no longer stands. The couple had no children and the baron was succeeded by his brother.

=== Second marriage ===
Her second husband was William O'Brien, 2nd Earl of Inchiquin. Like her first husband, the earl was a widower and some years her senior; however, he had children from his first marriage. They were married some time after 1684, but the earl, having been appointed Governor of Jamaica, died there in 1692. There were no children from their marriage.

=== Third marriage ===
Finally, in about 1694, Elizabeth married Charles Howard, 4th Baron Howard of Escrick. About three years later, she brought divorce proceedings against him on the grounds of bigamy. It was reported to the House of Lords in 1698 that Lord Howard had been "ordered by the peers to waive his privilege" and had offered his wife terms of divorce through an intermediary, his relative Charles Howard, 3rd Earl of Carlisle. This third marriage also produced no children. Lord Howard died in 1715 and his barony became extinct.

The former countess died in 1718, aged 67.
