= Veritate =

Veritate may refer to:

- The star 14 Andromedae.
- Caritas in Veritate (Latin: Charity in Truth) is the third encyclical of Pope Benedict XVI.
- De Veritate is a major work of Edward Herbert, 1st Baron Herbert of Cherbury.
- Quaestiones disputatae de Veritate is one of the works by Thomas Aquinas.
- Salva veritate substitution, from the Latin for "saving the truth", refers to two expressions that can be interchanged without changing the truth-value of the statements in which they occur.
