= Lymore, Montgomery =

Lymore Hall and Park
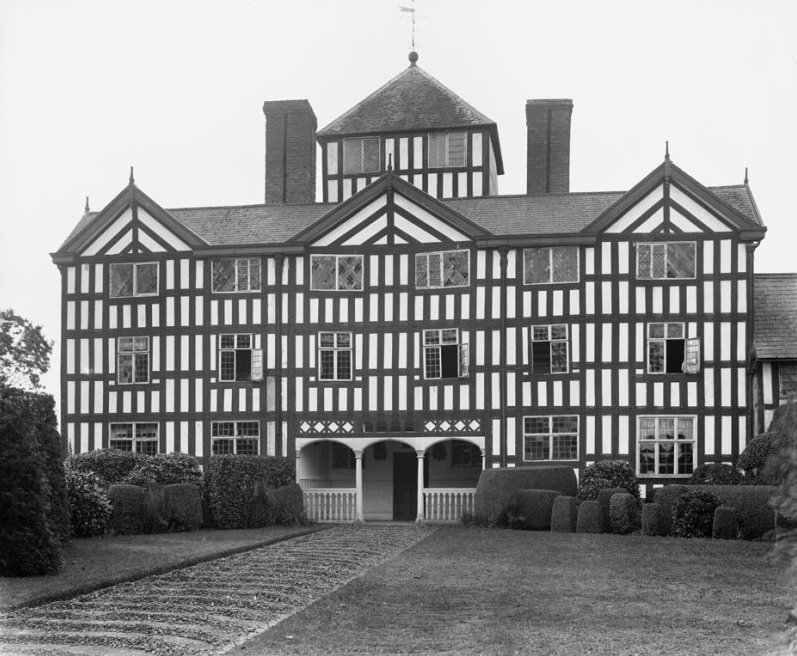
- Lymore Hall in 1909

- Location within Powys
- 52.558660°N 3.134393°W

History
- Built: c.1675
- Demolished: 1931

Site notes
- Architectural style: Timber Framed
- Governing body: Powis Estates

Lymore, or Lymore House or Lodge was demolished in 1931. It stood in Lymore Park, one mile ESE of Montgomery, Powys, Wales. The house was a large half-timbered house built by Edward Herbert, 3rd Baron Herbert of Chirbury, c. 1675, to replace the family residences in Montgomery Castle and Black Hall in Montgomery. The house, which had been uninhabited but maintained for many years, was used for an event in 1921, when one of the floors collapsed with disastrous consequences, resulting in demolition in 1931. The Earls of Powis still own and maintain the park. The park includes the grounds of the Montgomery Cricket Club, which is the oldest cricket pitch in Montgomeryshire and Offa's Dyke forms its eastern boundary. It is listed on the Cadw/ICOMOS Register of Parks and Gardens of Special Historic Interest in Wales.

== General description ==
Today, the site of Lymore Hall is overgrown, with the walled garden filled with trees. On the north side, the Gardeners' Cottages, shown on a survey of 1775, still stands. On the West side stands the Lymore Farmhouse (the former Steward's or Bailiff's House) which was originally attached to the main house. It incorporates much early brick. On the West, the site is partly encircled by three large ornamental lakes, probably late 17th century, though the Middle Pool, traversed by a causeway is now dry. Opposite, on the Middle Pool are the stone walls of a curious ‘fortified’ farmyard (either a folly, or for militia training) and a Georgian brick farmhouse. There was also a mill building (later converted to a water driven sawmill), which was part of the ornamental setting (cf Mill at Dunham Massey, Cheshire) with gardens on the East side. Elsewhere, more elements of the hunting park layout can be observed, with fox coverts and decoy ponds with a hut in wood to South and another possible decoy pond in Bronyhall wood. Throughout the parkland there are numerous old oaks. The tree ring-evidence from a recently felled example suggests that they were planted in the late 17th century. A letter from Lord Herbert of Chirbury in 1673 mentions that he intended to sow the frith with nuts and acorns for a perpetual stock of fuel

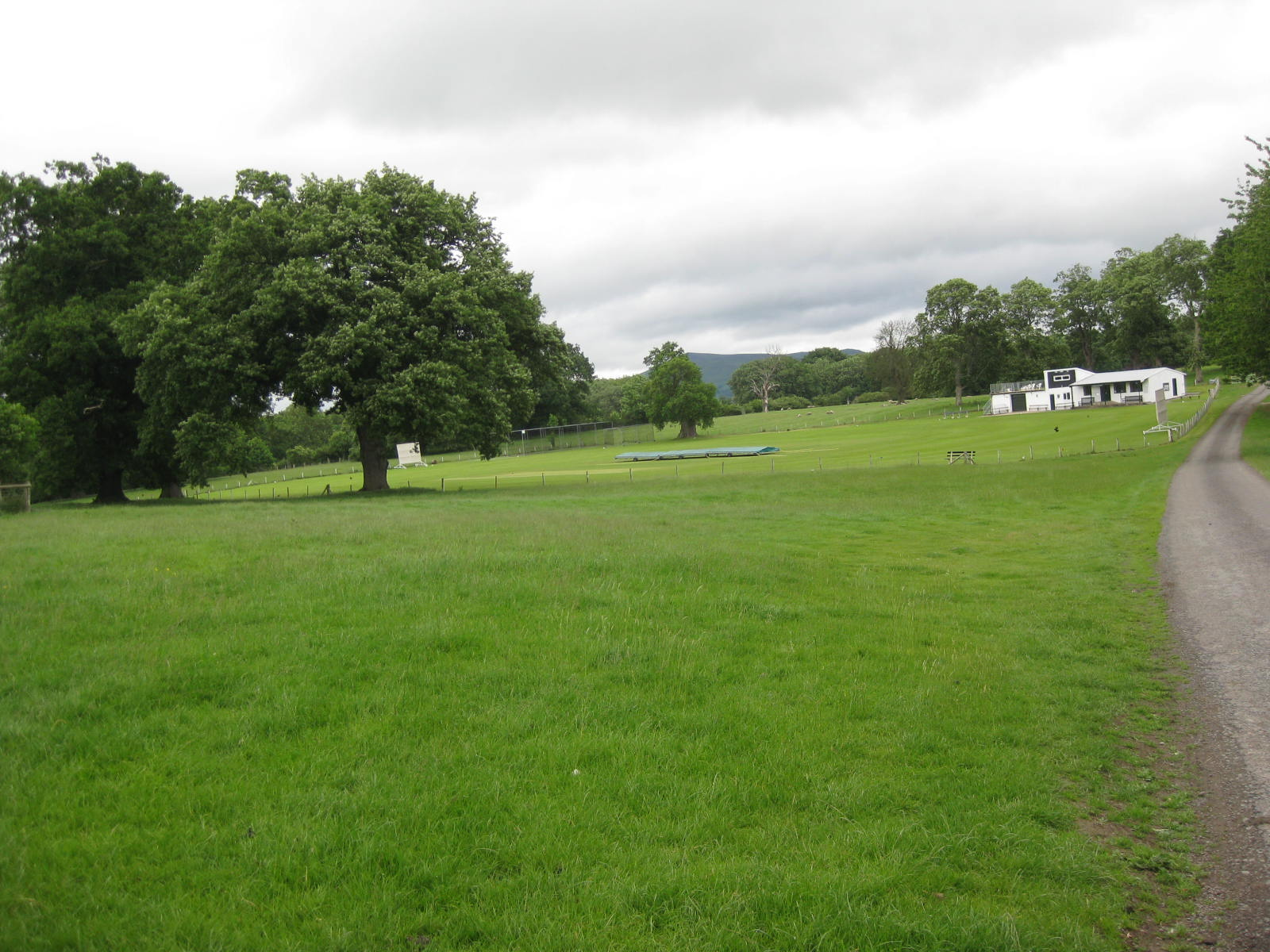
Cricket Pitch with Corndon Hill in background, Lymore Park

=== The Montgomery Cricket Club ===
The cricket pitch is to the North East of the house. The earliest recorded match on the Lymore pitch was on 17 September 1847 between eleven gentlemen of Montgomery and eleven of Newtown. After this the club became established and in 1882 a match was played between A United All England Eleven versus 22 of Montgomery. The Montgomery team won by 62 runs in a two-innings match. In the 1970s the original wooden pavilion was replaced by the present brick pavilion.

== History ==
=== The park before Lymore was built ===
The earliest features, revealed by excavation and aerial photography, are the medieval causeway on the North side of the park, which continues to the Hollow Way going to the Rhydywiman ford in the river Severn, which would have linked with the Trystllywelyn causeway on the other side of the Severn. This would have been a major routeway into Wales before the foundation of the town of Montgomery. A slightly later feature is a possible Deserted Medieval Village, which may have been a vill of Chirbury Priory, with a large area of ridge and furrow cultivation. The creation of the Park at Lymore, would have taken place after the Herberts acquired the lands of Chirbury Priory in the late 16th century

=== Building history ===
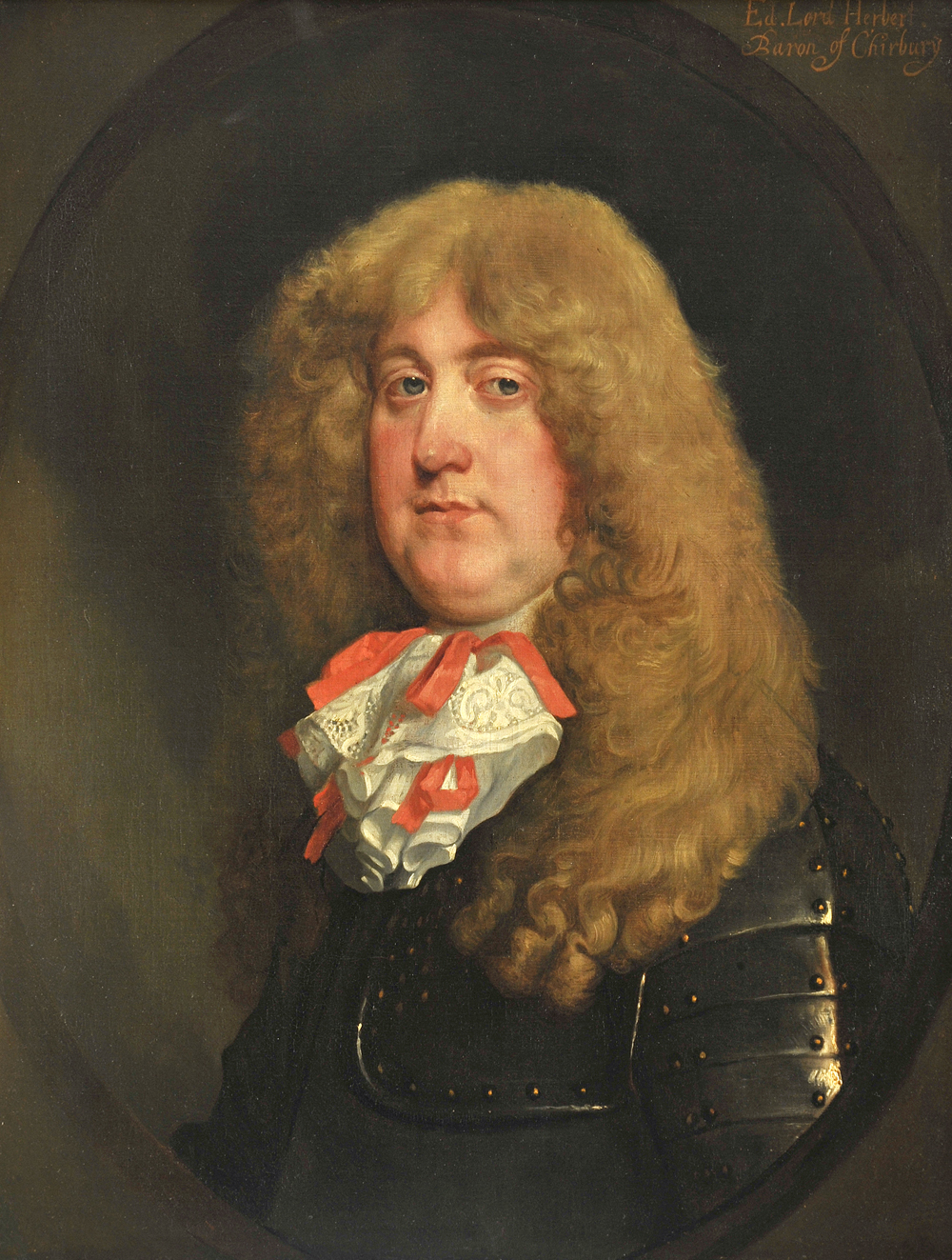
Edward Herbert, 3rd Lord Herbert of Cherbury, builder of Lymore. Portrait by Soest in Powis Castle

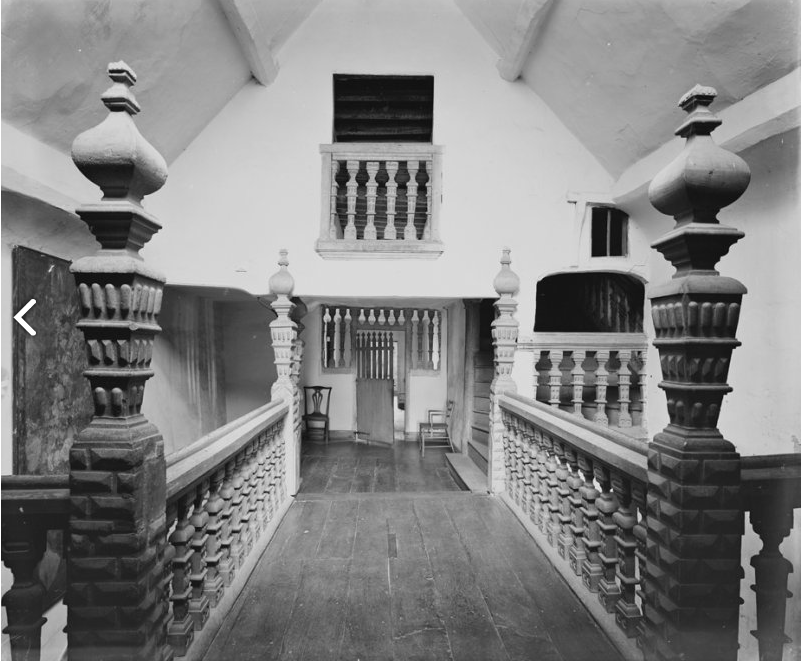
Lymore, Montgomery in 1909, showing the staircase gallery, taken 15.12.1909

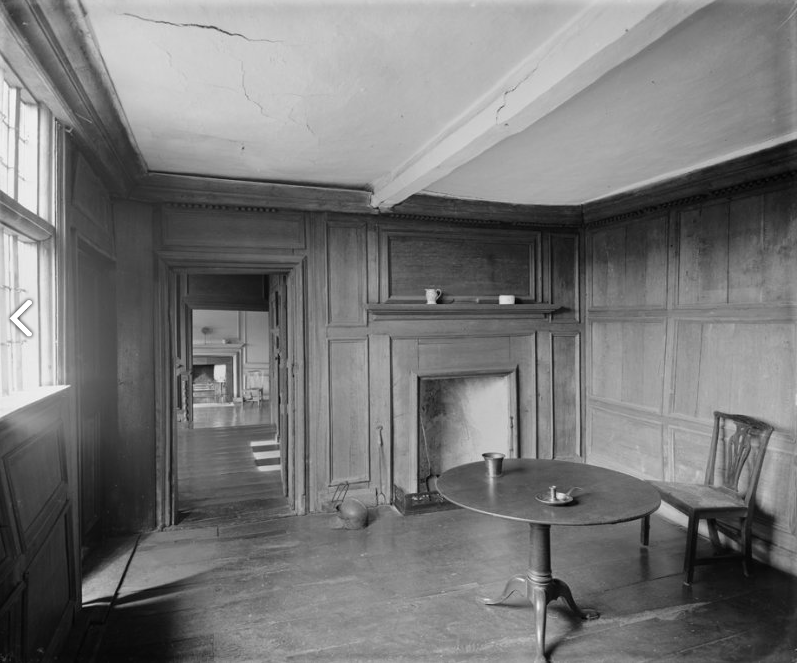
Lymore, Montgomery in 1909. Panelled Room

The house was a large and late half-timbered house built by Edward, third Lord Herbert of Cherbury, c. 1675 (date on a gable finial but not finished until 1677, a year before Lord Herbert's death) to replace the New Building in the outer bailey of Montgomery, and possibly his other house Plas Llysen or Llysun, which was set in his other Montgomeryshire park at Llanerfyl. The house had a close-studded frontage, with an open three-bay loggia on the ground floor, six gables, and, rising from the centre, a pyramid-roofed look-out tower. This lookout tower can be compared with the stair-turret lookout at Plas Mawr, Conwy and a very similar tower on Oak House West Bromwich.

A series of letters between Edward Herbert and his agent Roger Jones provides a fairly detailed outline of the building work that was taking place. In the first letter Lord Herbert of Cherbury is undecided whether to re-build at Black Hall, below the Castle at Montgomery or at Lymore. He, however, decides to have 300,000 bricks fired at the estate brickyard (this would have been at the Stalloe brickyard to the North East of Montgomery). He then acquires more land at Lymore and proceeds with demolishing "Powell's" house to use for timber for Lymore. There is then a detailed account of the construction work and particularly alterations to the staircase. It has been speculated that the staircase, which, in 1931, was removed to Aldborough Hall in Yorkshire, came from the New Build, in Montgomery Castle, but this is unsubstantiated. Although Lymore is thought primarily as being a timber framed house, a huge quantity of bricks were used in the extensive kitchen and service wing that lay to the south. This was pulled down after 1795. Early bricks were also used in the walled garden and the Steward's house which was reconstructed in 1931. The earliest drawing of Lymore is dated July 1684, when it was sketched by Thomas Dineley, who was accompanying the Duke of Beaufort on his progress through Wales. The north frontage of the house was shown with six gables. A survey of the valuation of Lands belonging to the Earls of Powis in 1785 shows the house with eight gables. The house was drawn by Moses Griffiths for Thomas Pennant in 1775, during his tour of Montgomeryshire and Shropshire. Thomas Pennant intended to re-publish this tour and in 1794–5 he commissioned three further watercolours of Lymore from John Ingleby, which are now in a collection in the National Library of Wales. These watercolours add greatly to our knowledge of Lymore and particularly for details of the brick service range to the south of the timber framed reception areas of Lymore Hall. An extensive reconstruction of Lymore must have taken place in the early years of the 19th century, when the number of gables on the north frontage were reduced to three.

=== Illustrations by John Ingleby of Lymore 1794/5 ===
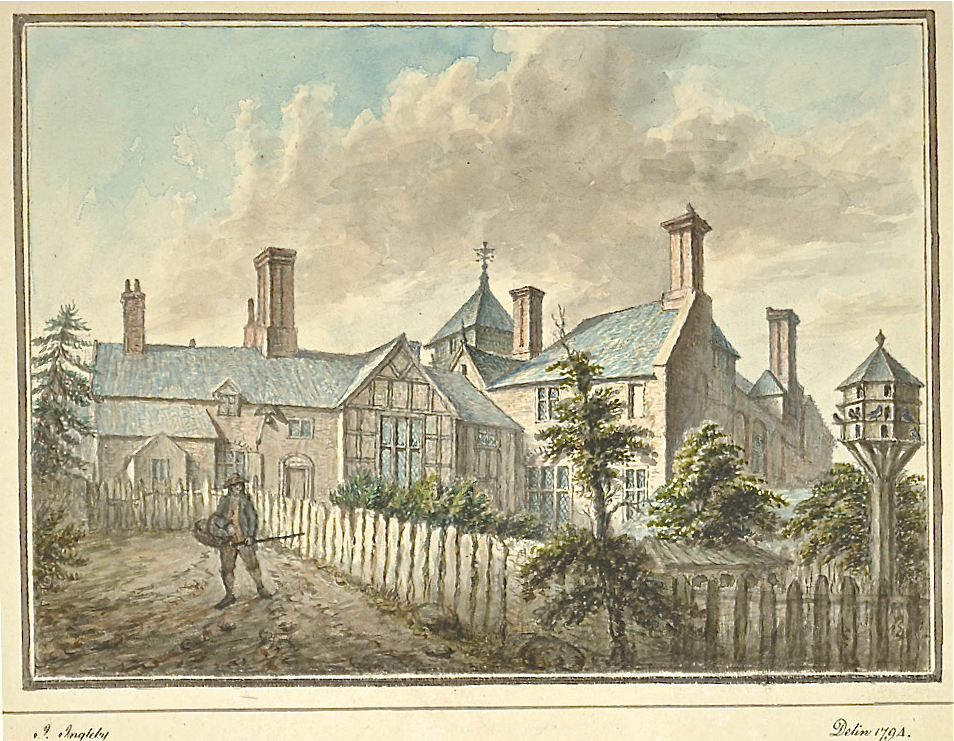
Kitchen Wing and Steward's House in 1795

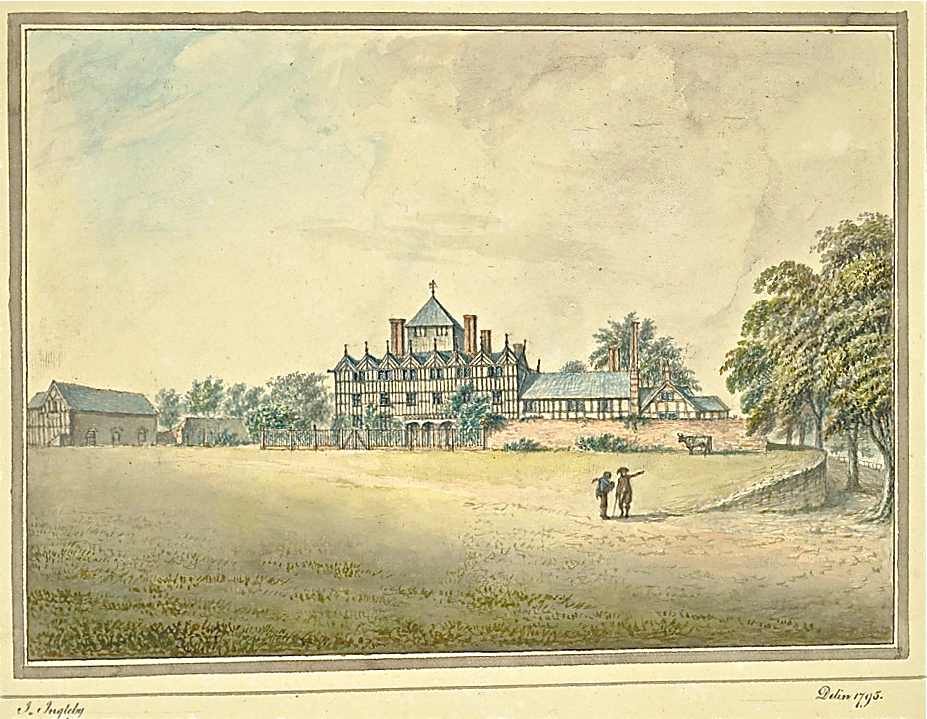
Lymore, Montgomery

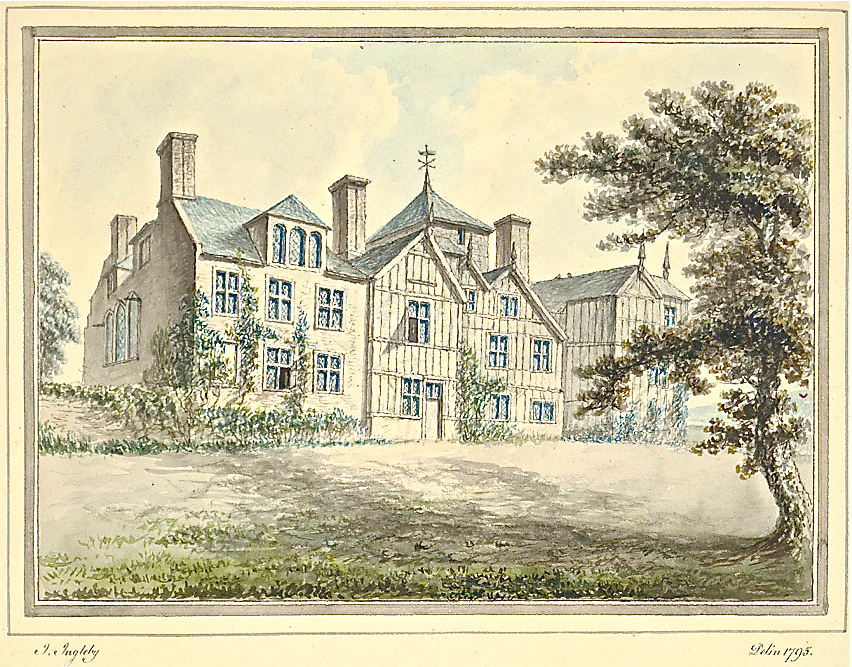
Lymore East Garden frontage

=== Later history and demolition in 1931 ===
Lymore was only lived in for one year by Edward Herbert, 3rd Baron Herbert of Chirbury, and he was succeeded by Henry, the 4th Baron, who died in 1691. His widow Lady Catherine continued to live at Lymore until her death in 1714, when the house and estate devolved to Francis Herbert of Dolguog at Penegoes in Montgomeryshire.

In 1903 Fletcher Moss in his Pilgrimages to Old Homes, mostly on the Welsh Borders gives a graphic account of being shown round the deserted house by the daughter of the caretaker. He recounts cycling up to the hall amid a herd of grand Herefords, some of which looked like weighing a ton, and by a picturesque saw-mill where great trunks of trees are piled up. He remarks that the oak in this house is wonderful. All the floors in the house are waxed and polished, but the panelling, doors and other oaken work is simply dusted. He noted that the house was well kept, some of the old furniture was still there, and that fires were lit during the winter to keep the house warm. Lady Powis had had a picnic tea there the previous day and Lord Kitchener was shortly to come for a shoot. In 1907 the house was recorded in Country Life and in 1909, the future King George V came to Lymore as the guest of the 4th Earl of Powis for a shooting party.

The end of Lymore was heralded in August 1921, when the floor of the Banqueting Hall dramatically collapsed in the course of a church bazaar. This was graphically described at great length in the Montgomeryshire Express and Radnor Times of Tuesday 9 August 1921. It was reported that there was a considerable congestion of people near the main entrance … suddenly without any audible promontory symptoms, a knot of guest were observed to disappear outright. 17 people had disappeared, nearly 12 feet below, into a stone vault. The Earl of Powis was at the time talking to the Rector of Montgomery, and he disappeared with the lady journalist from the Montgomeryshire County Times, while the Rector remained above. Fortunately, no-one was badly injured although some people were badly shaken.

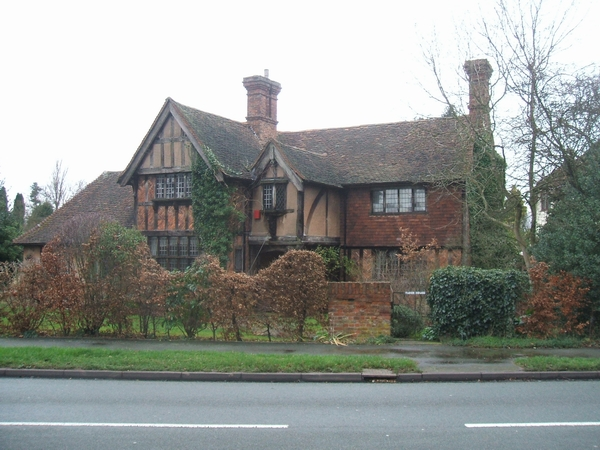
Tudor House, Histons Hill. A house rebuilt using timber from Lymore

In 1929 the Earl of Powis decided that he could no longer afford the cost of maintenance and offered the house through the Office of Works to the nation. The Earl also offered the house to anyone for £1 to anyone who would put it in order. The house was then surveyed by the architect A B Waters and his report in the Montgomeryshire Collections provides detailed plans and elevations of the house, as it stood. The furnishings and fittings of the House were then offered for sale at an auction on 25 October 1929 by the Estate department of Harrods. A last minute offer of £10,000 was made by the National Trust through the Office of Works to preserve the house for the Nation, but the Office of Works did not consider that this was a sufficient sum for the repair work, so the sale went ahead. This was followed on 20 May 1931 by a sale of the structural elements of the house. A fine carved staircase with diamond-rusticated newels had already been removed to Aldborough Hall in Yorkshire. Much of the other timber was purchased by Kenneth Hutchinson-Smith, an architect/builder from Wolverhampton, where it was used for building mock, Tudor houses.

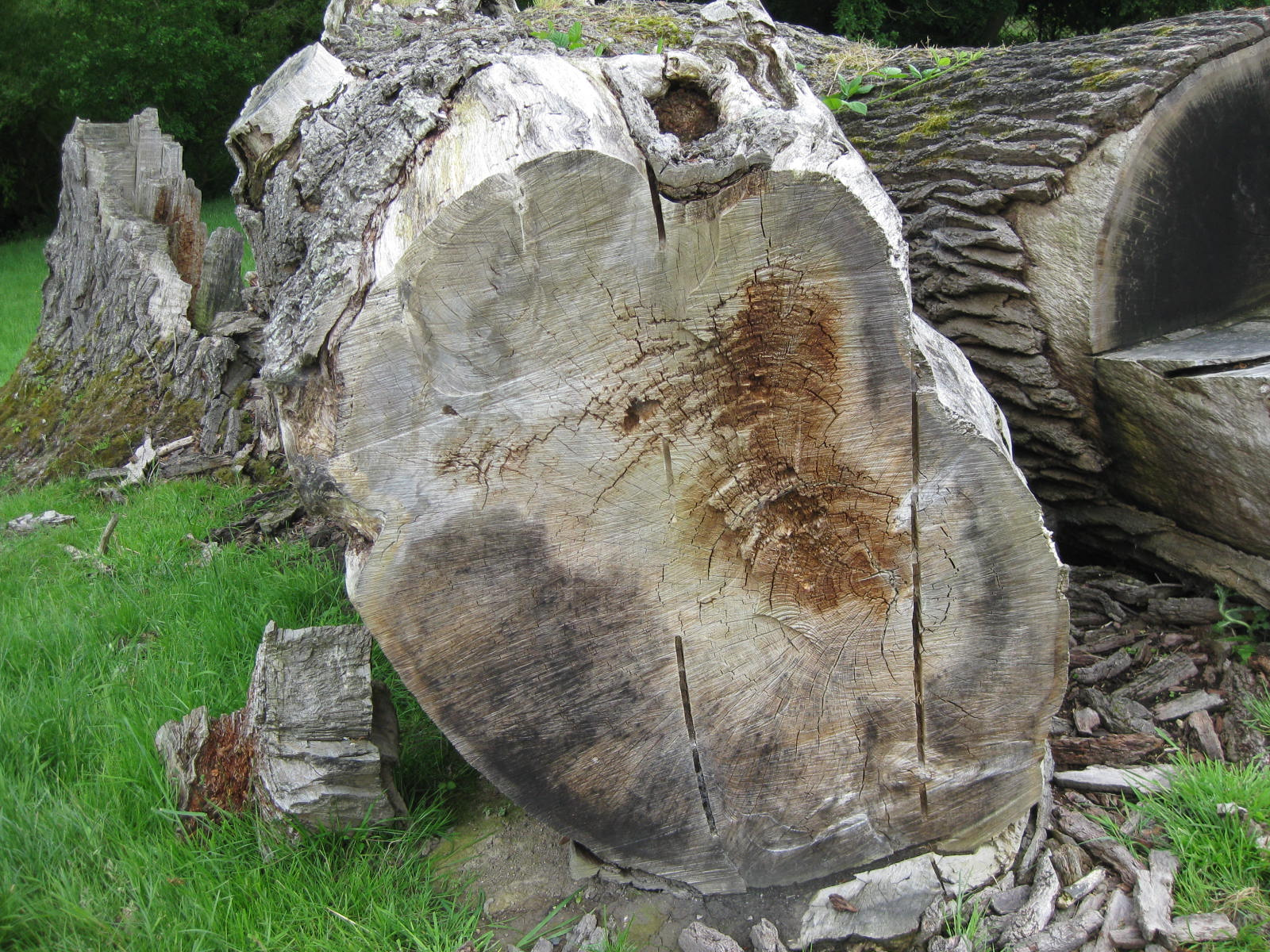
Sawn trunk of Oak Tree that had been blown down. The tree rings indicate it was planted in the late 17th century.

=== The gardens and pools ===
On the West the site is partly encircled by three large ornamental lakes, probably late 17th century, though the Middle Pool, traversed by a causeway is now dry. Opposite, on the Middle Pool are the stone walls of a curious ‘fortified’ farmyard (is this a folly or was it for training the militia?) and a Georgian brick farmhouse. The gardens and park are listed at Grade II on the Cadw/ICOMOS Register of Parks and Gardens of Special Historic Interest in Wales.

== Gallery ==
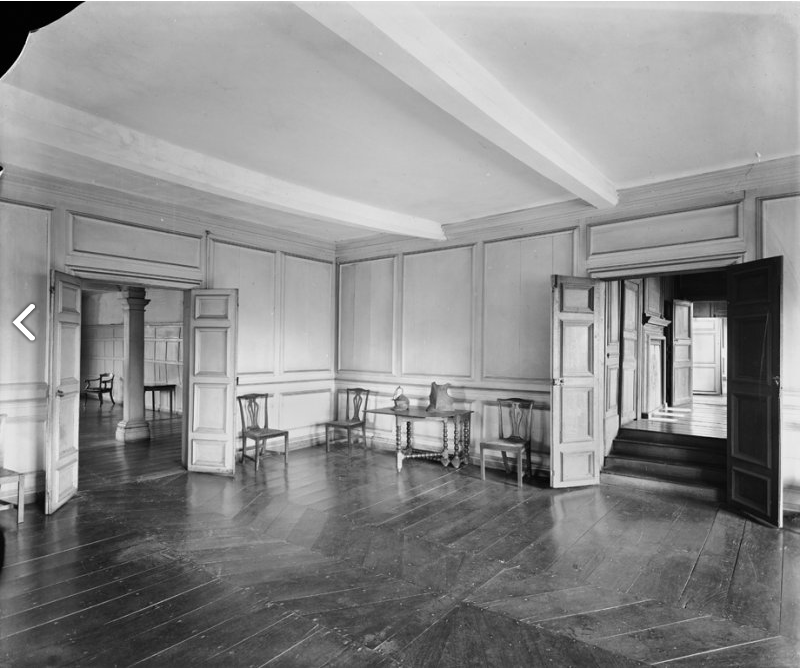
Lymore, Montgomery in 1909, showing dining room, taken 15.12.1909

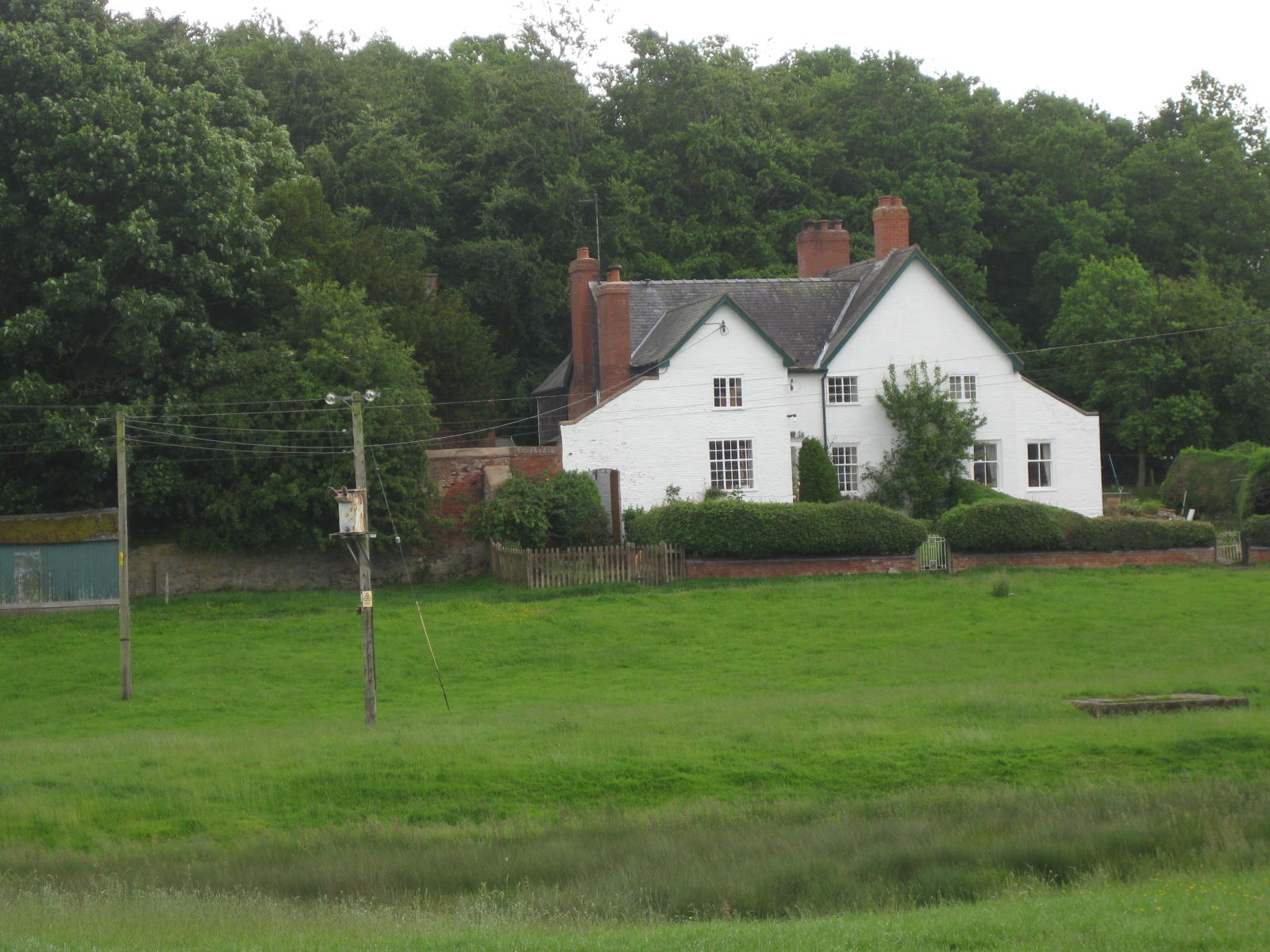
The Farm House or Steward's House, Lymore Park, Montgomery

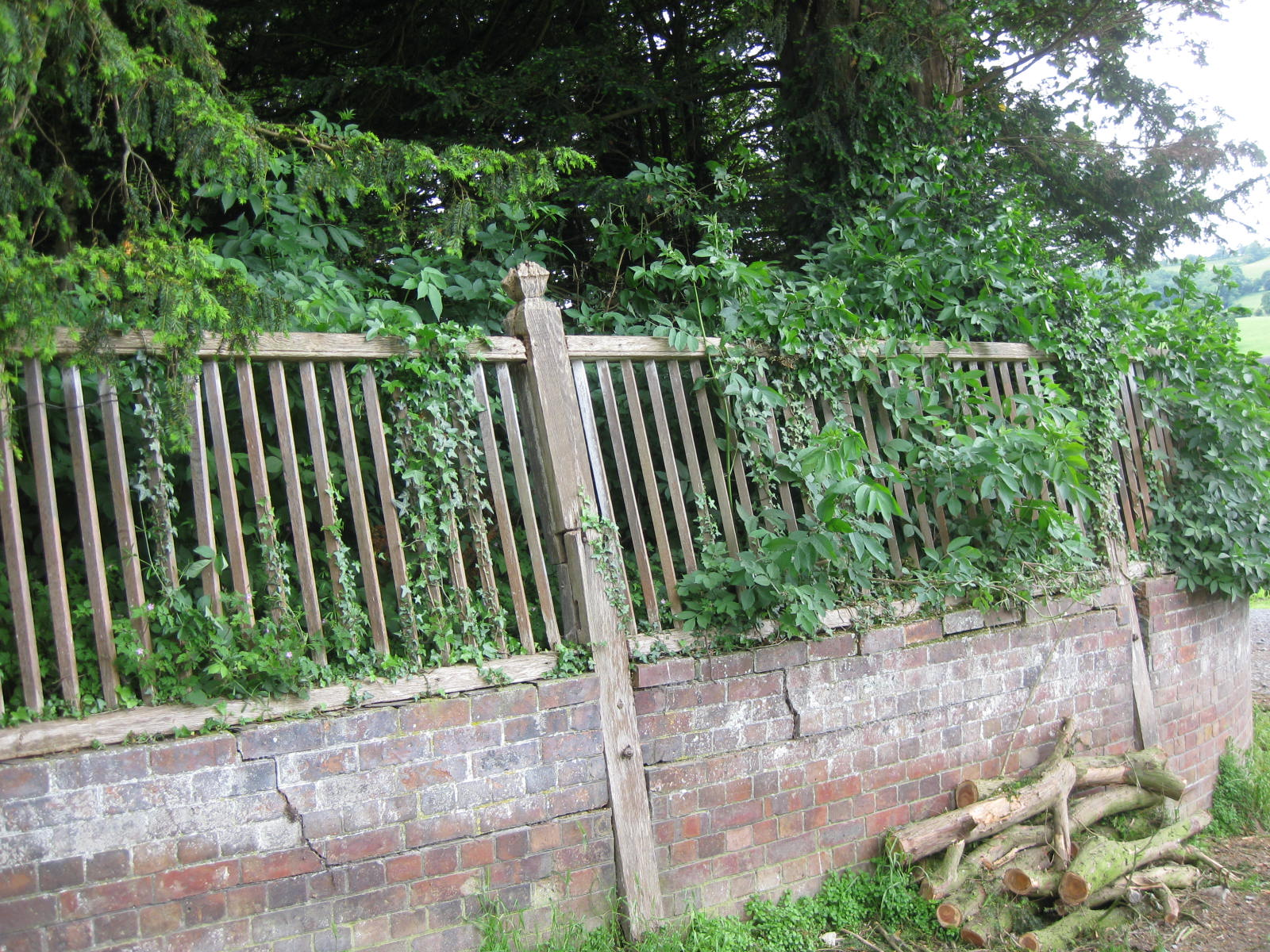
Old wooden rails at Lymore Park

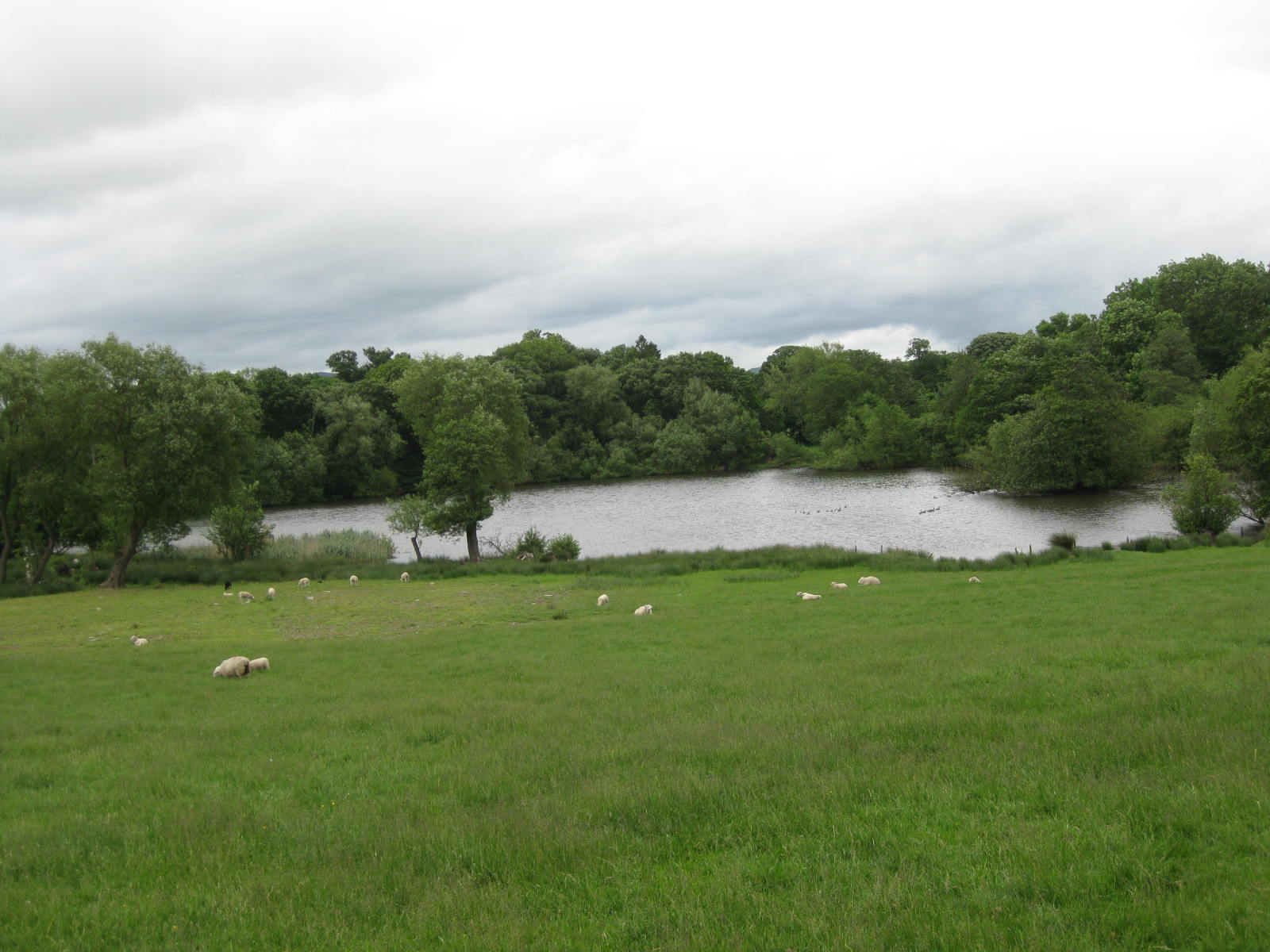
The Lower Lake at Lymore Park Montgomery

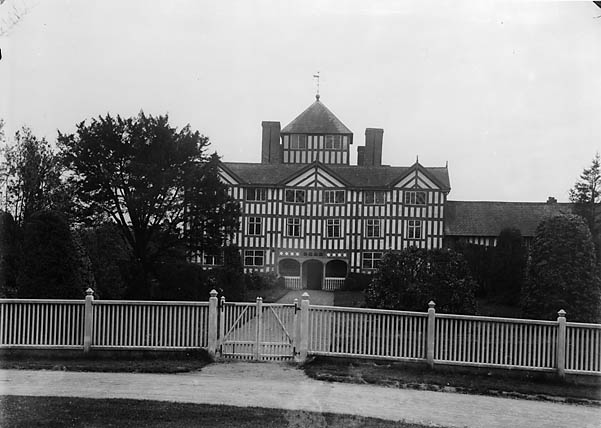
Lymore Hall, Montgomery

== See also ==
- Powis Castle
- Aberbechan Hall
- The Old Bell Museum, Montgomery, Powys.
