= Richard Davies (Quaker) =

Welsh quaker

- Born: 1635; Welshpool, Wales
- Died: April 1708 (aged 72–73)
- Occupation: Quaker minister

Richard Davies (1635 – April 1708) was a Welsh Quaker; he was known as the godfather of Welsh Quakerism. Initially persecuted for his beliefs and teachings, he was a recognised minister for 45 years. His only publication was An Account of the Convincement, Exercises, and Services of that Ancient Servant of the Lord, R. D., &c. (1710).

== Early life ==
Richard Davies was born in 1635 at Welshpool, Wales, where his family had a fair estate, and received his education in that town. Although brought up to the episcopal church, when only 13 years old he began to go to dissenters' meetings, and used to follow one independent minister when he preached at considerable distances. When 14 he was sent, preliminary to being apprenticed, on trial to a tradesman, but a single conversation proving that his destined master's religious views were not "right", he returned home, and waited until he met with a felt-maker of whose opinions he approved, to whom he apprenticed himself.

== Career as a Quaker ==
In 1657 he met with a person who professed Quaker principles, and, without joining that body, Davies broke off his connection with the independents, and adopted the Quaker forms of speech and customs, for using which his mistress once broke his head and, as he alleged, tried to murder him. Shortly before the termination of his apprenticeship he visited Welshpool, and, going with his parents to church, interrupted the preacher, for which he was arrested, but discharged by the magistrates, as his offence was not sufficient to constitute legal brawling. Finding three other men of like mind, he commenced to worship with them on a hillside in Quaker fashion, for which he was avoided, and underwent some petty persecution.

He was married in 1657.

On the termination of his apprenticeship in 1658–9 he went to live in London, joining the Friends, among whom he soon became a minister, and working at his trade of felt-maker or hatter. About the same time he married.

Towards the end of 1660, while on a visit to Welshpool, he was arrested in the middle of the night, on a charge of being inimical to the government, by some soldiers. The magistrates, to whom he was known, interfered in his behalf, and as the soldiers refused to liberate him, a crowd collected, and abetted by the magistrates made preparations for a riot. On Davies promising to surrender himself at Montgomery prison the next morning, the soldiers let him go. This promise he kept, on his way avoiding, he relates, going near the house of an uncle, a magistrate, who he feared might prevent him. He was only imprisoned, though with great severity, for a fortnight, when he went to a meeting at which, with 25 others, he was arrested and sent to the gaol at Shrewsbury. On condition of promising that these prisoners should all appear at the next assizes, he, after a few days, obtained their release, for which, as it was harvest time, he was particularly anxious. At the assizes they were discharged on condition of returning home at once.

As a minister Davies was so successful that in the course of a few years the greater part of the inhabitants for miles round Welshpool professed Quakerism. His converts were severely persecuted, and Davies, whose influence was considerable, was instrumental in relieving the wants of those who were confined in overcrowded prisons, as well as in obtaining the release of a large number. Among other magistrates he visited the third Lord Herbert of Cherbury, who asked the clergyman introducing him who he was. The other replied, "A Quaker and a haberdasher of hats". "Oh", said Lord Herbert, "I thought he was such an one, for he keeps his hat so fast on the block". Lord Herbert refused to use his influence to liberate the Friends altogether, but obtained for them so much liberty that they were allowed to leave the prison and go where they liked so long as they did not return to their homes, and Davies seems to have been instrumental in providing a house for their use.

In 1662 he was again arrested at Welshpool, but was offered his liberty if he would consent to go to church the following Sunday, which he accepted, and insisted on speaking both during the morning and evening service. He, however, always spoke with so much courtesy that he generally parted on friendly terms with the preachers he interrupted, and many of his closest friends were ministers whom he opposed.

In his An Account of the Convincement, Exercises, and Services of that Ancient Servant of the Lord, R. D., &c., he states that he was for the next ten years nominally a prisoner under a writ of præmunire, but he was put under no restraint of any kind, and, although during these years, which he occupied as a travelling minister, he was frequently arrested, he was never detained more than a few hours. On one of his journeys he made the acquaintance of Thomas Corbet, a barrister, of whose legal knowledge he made such use as to obtain the liberation of numbers of imprisoned Friends. From this time the relief and liberation of the suffering Quakers seems to have been his real business, and he never hesitated to urge them to take any advantage a faulty writ or technical error might afford.

In 1680, while he was in London, a writ of excommunication was issued against him. He immediately returned to Wales, and called on Dr. Lloyd, the bishop of St. Asaph, who offered to annul the writ, an offer Davies declined until the bishop agreed to include all the other Friends who were in like condition. In his Account he gives a very amusing narrative of an interview he had on behalf of imprisoned Friends with Lord Hyde at Whitehall, and of another with Earl Powys, who, he records, never allowed the Quakers to be fined for not serving on juries, or otherwise offending for conscience sake, in any places where he had influence. He seems to have been on most friendly terms with several of the bishops and the more important clergy, and to have been almost always successful in persuading them to exercise their influence on behalf of the Friends. In 1702 he was one of the 12 Quakers sent by the yearly meeting to present an address to the queen and to have acted as spokesman, after which he returned to Wales, going round by Worcester in order to stop with his firm friend Dr. Lloyd, who had been translated to that see from St. Asaph. Davies visited London again in 1704 and 1706 to be present at the yearly meetings.

== Death and legacy ==
He died after a very brief illness in January 1708, and was interred in the Friends' burying-place near his house at Cloddiechion, near Welshpool. He was a recognised minister for 45 years. He was a man of amiable disposition, of considerable gift in preaching, kind-hearted, charitable, and unpretending, with considerable tact and foresight.

His only work is An Account of the Convincement, Exercises, and Services of that Ancient Servant of the Lord, R. D., &c., 1710, which has been frequently republished in England and America. This may include writings by the Quaker, James Park.
