= De Veritate =

1624 philosophical work of Edward Herbert

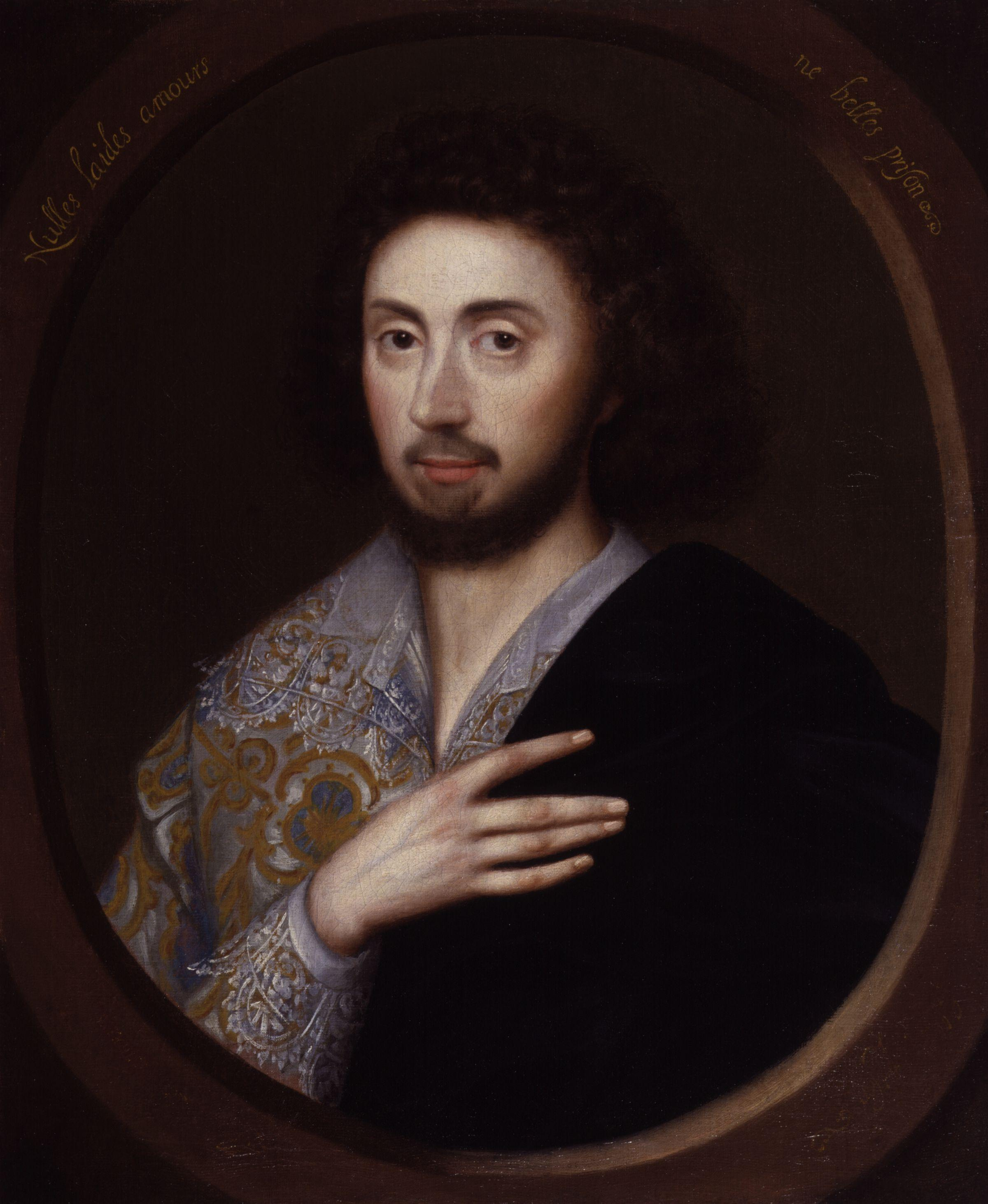
Portrait of Edward Herbert by Isaac Oliver, c. 1603–05

De Veritate, prout distinguitur a revelatione, a verisimili, a possibili, et a falso is the major work of Edward Herbert, 1st Baron Herbert of Cherbury. He published it in 1624 on the advice of Hugo Grotius.

== Overview ==
De Veritate combines a theory of knowledge with a partial psychology, a methodology for the investigation of truth, and a scheme of natural religion. The author's method is prolix and often far from clear, but does contain the skeleton and much of the soul of a complete philosophy. Giving up all past theories as useless, Herbert professedly endeavours to constitute a new and true system. Truth, which he defines as a just conformation of the faculties with one another and with their objects, he distributed into four classes or stages:

1. truth in the thing or the truth of the object;
2. truth of the appearance;
3. truth of the apprehension (conceptus);
4. truth of the intellect.

The faculties of the mind are as numerous as the differences of their objects, and are accordingly innumerable; but they may be arranged in four groups. The first and fundamental and most certain group is the Natural Instinct, to which belong the notitiae communes, which are innate, of divine origin and indisputable. The second group, the next in certainty, is the sensus internus (under which head Herbert discusses amongst others love, hate, fear, conscience with its communis notitia, and free will); the third is the sensus externus; and the fourth is discursus, reasoning, to which, as being the least certain, we have recourse when the other faculties fail. The ratiocinative faculties proceed by division and analysis, by questioning, and are slow and gradual in their movement; they take aid from the other faculties, those of the instinctus naturalis being always the final test. Herbert's categories or questions to be used in investigation are ten in number whether (a thing is), what, of what sort, how much, in what relation, how, when, where, whence, wherefore. No faculty, rightly used, can err "even in dreams"; badly exercised, reasoning becomes the source of almost all our errors. The discussion of the notitiae communes is the most characteristic part of the book.

The exposition of them, though highly dogmatic, is at times strikingly Kantian in substance. "So far are these elements or sacred principles from being derived from experience or observation that without some of them, or at least some one of them, we can neither experience nor even observe." Unless we felt driven by them to explore the nature of things, "it would never occur to us to distinguish one thing from another."

It cannot be said that Herbert proves the existence of the common notions; he does not deduce them or even give any list of them. However, each faculty has its common notion; and they may be distinguished by six marks: their priority, independence, universality, certainty, necessity (for the well-being of man), and immediacy. Law is based on certain common notions; so is religion.

Though Herbert expressly defines the scope of his book as dealing with the intellect, not faith, it is the common notions of religion he has illustrated most fully; and it is plain that it is in this part of his system that he is chiefly interested. There is little polemic against the received form of Christianity, but Herbert's attitude towards the Church's doctrine is distinctly negative, and he denies revelation except to the individual soul. In the De veritate Herbert produced the first purely metaphysical treatise, written by an Englishman. Herbert's real claim to fame is as "the father of English Deism". The common notions of religion are the famous five articles, which became the charter of the English deists. Charles Blount, in particular, acted as a publicist for Herbert's idea.

The initial reception for De Veritate was largely negative, with Herbert's friend, Pierre Gassendi, offering destructive criticism. Mersenne translated it into French, and sent a copy to René Descartes. Descartes possibly did not take the book seriously until late in 1639; but then produced an essay on metaphysics himself in short order.

== Bibliography ==
- De Veritate, English translation by Meyrick H. Carré (University of Bristol, 1937); facsimile reprint: Thoemmes Continuum (1999) ISBN 1-85506-126-0.
