= William James Gardner =

British missionary in Jamaica

The Reverend William James Gardner (1825 – 25 November 1874) was a missionary of the London Missionary Society in Jamaica. He wrote a history of Jamaica that was published in 1873, founded the first Building Society in Jamaica, and also founded the Society for Promotion of Pure Literature.

== Early life and family ==
William Gardner was born in 1825.

== Career ==
Gardner was a missionary of the London Missionary Society. He and his wife embarked for Jamaica from London in September 1849 and took charge of the Chapleton mission station there. He moved to Kingston in January 1856 where he was the minister of the North Street Congregational Church.

He wrote a history of Jamaica that was published in 1873, founded the first Building Society in Jamaica, and also founded the Society for Promotion of Pure Literature.

== Death ==
Gardner died on 25 November 1874 and was buried at the North Street Congregational Church.

== Selected publications ==
- A History of Jamaica: From its Discovery by Christopher Columbus to the Year 1872 &c. Elliot Stock, London, 1873.
- A History of Jamaica &c. New edition, with a preface by Aston W. Gardner. T. Fisher Unwin, London, 1909 [1908].
