= Richard Herbert, 2nd Baron Herbert of Chirbury =

Anglo-Welsh Member of Parliament, Royalist and peer

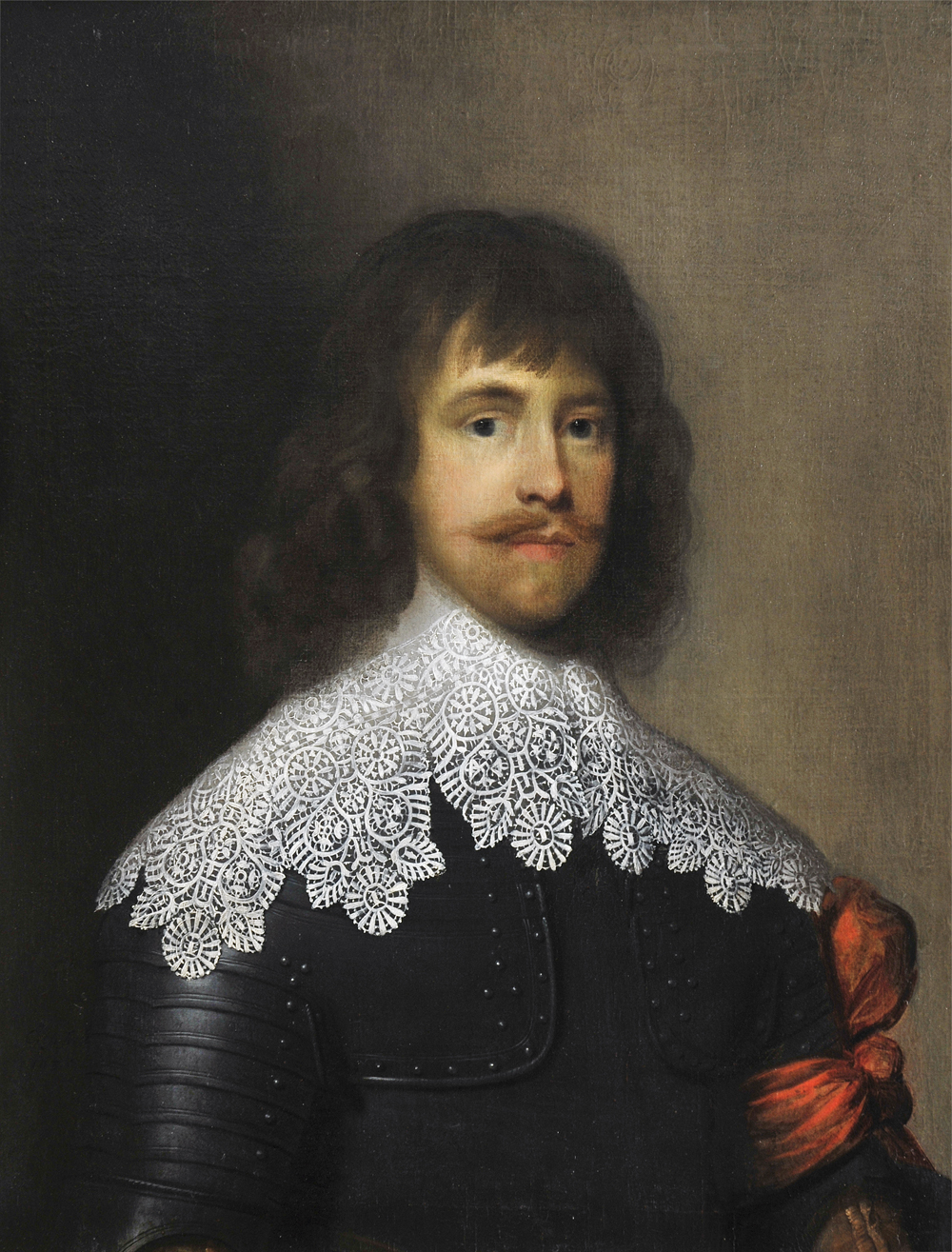
Richard Herbert in 1635

Richard Herbert, 2nd Baron Herbert of Chirbury (c. 1604 – 13 May 1655) was an Anglo-Welsh Member of Parliament, a Royalist who fought with the rank of colonel in the English Civil War, and a peer whose membership of the House of Lords was curtailed by its abolition in 1649.

== Life ==
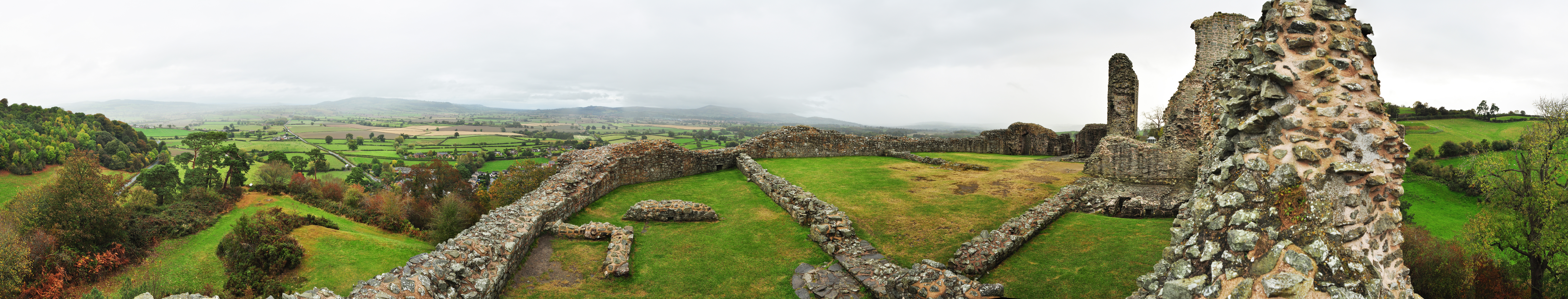
View from the ruins of Montgomery Castle, Herbert's family seat

Herbert, born about 1604, was the elder son of the poet Edward Herbert, 1st Baron Herbert of Cherbury, of Montgomery Castle, and of Mary, the daughter and heiress of Sir William Herbert (d. 1593), both members of a collateral branch of the family of the Earls of Pembroke. He was born while his father was under the age of twenty-one.

On 19 November 1627 at Bridgwater House, Barbican, City of London, Herbert married Lady Mary Egerton (c. 1604–1659), one of the five daughters of John Egerton, 1st Earl of Bridgwater. Their children were two sons, Edward and Henry, and two daughters, Frances and Florence.

As the result of his marriage, Herbert was the brother-in-law of David Cecil, 3rd Earl of Exeter (c. 1600–1643), Sir John Hobart (1593–1647), Richard Vaughan, 2nd Earl of Carbery (c. 1600–1686), Oliver St John, 5th Baron St John of Bletso (d. 1642), and John Egerton, 2nd Earl of Bridgewater (1623–1686).

A Royalist, in March 1640 Herbert was elected to the Commons in the Short Parliament representing Montgomeryshire. In October of the same year, at the outset of the Long Parliament, he was elected from Montgomery. He was appointed Royal Governor of Bridgnorth in 1642, as the English Civil War was breaking out. At his own expense, in the king's cause he raised both a foot regiment and a troop of horse, and the king gave him the rank of colonel. On 12 October 1642 he was disabled from sitting in parliament, on account of having executed the Commission of Array in Shropshire and of joining the king at Oxford. In 1643, he was granted Master of Arts of the University of Oxford and became Governor of Ludlow.

In July 1643, Colonel Richard Herbert, in command of his regiment, was with Prince Rupert of the Rhine at the capture of Bristol.

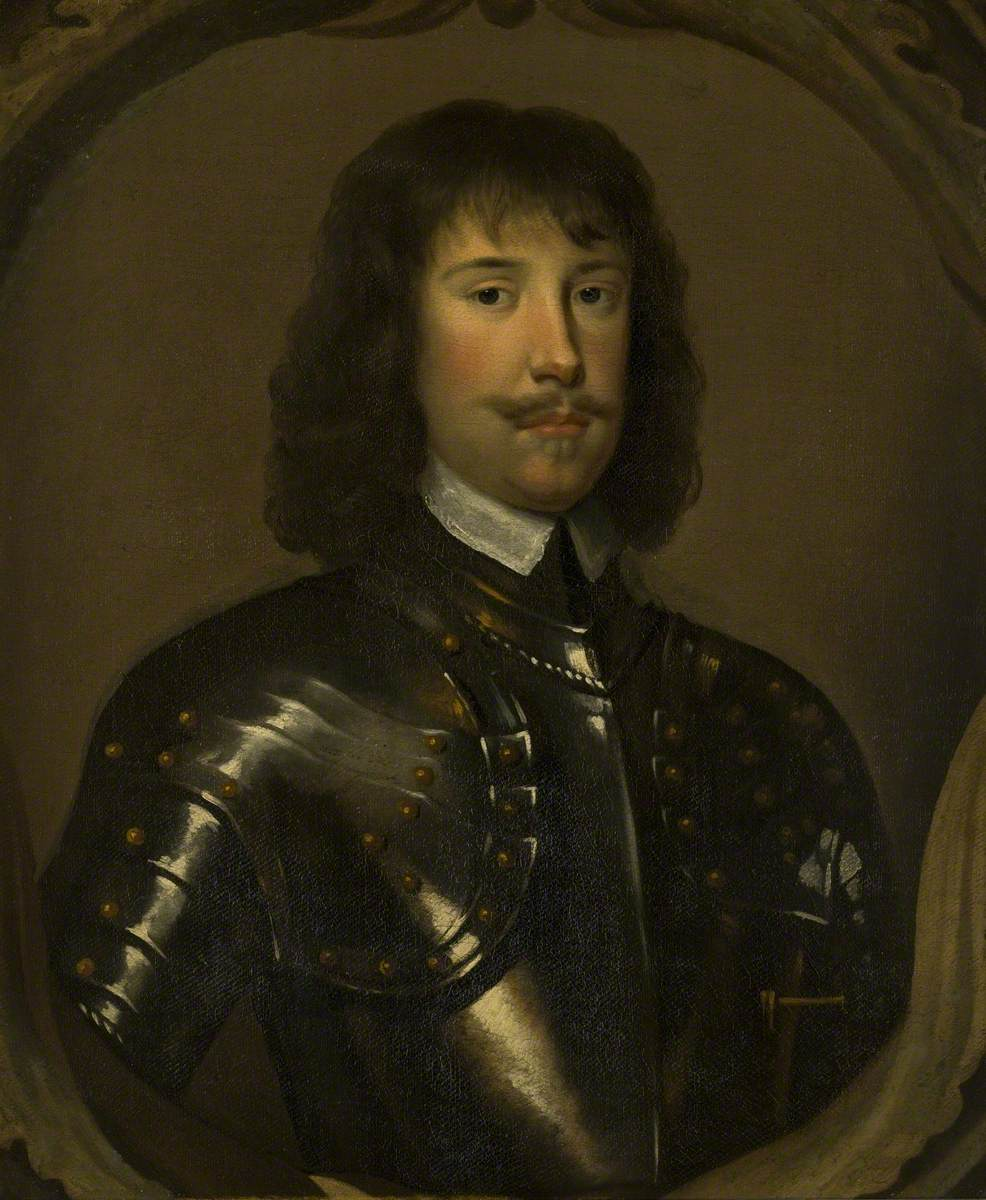
A portrait of Lord Herbert in armour by Willem Wissing

On 5 September 1644 Herbert's father Lord Herbert surrendered the family seat of Montgomery Castle, by negotiation, to parliamentary forces led by Sir Thomas Myddelton. The older Herbert returned to London, submitted to parliament, and received a pension of £20 a week, while the Castle was subsequently slighted.

Herbert was Governor of Aberystwyth in 1644 and of Newport in 1645, but he took the Negative Oath and on 6 March 1647 "petitioned to compound", with the result that he was fined £1,000 as the price of making his peace with parliament.

When Herbert's father died on 5 August 1648, he inherited his father's titles, Baron Herbert of Castle Island in the peerage of Ireland and Baron Herbert of Chirbury in the peerage of England, but little else. His younger brother, Edward, received the manor of Llyssin for life, while his own son, another Edward, received his grandfather's books and most of his personal property. Herbert himself, the elder son, got only his father's horses and was instructed to "make much of the white horse", while his wife, the new Lady Herbert, was bequeathed her father-in-law's viols and lutes.

He was briefly a member of the House of Lords, until on 19 March 1649 it was abolished by an Act of Parliament that declared that "The Commons of England find by too long experience that the House of Lords is useless and dangerous to the people of England". The Lords did not meet again until the Convention Parliament of 1660.

Herbert succeeded his father as Chief Forester of Snowdon. He died on 13 May 1655 and was buried at Montgomery.

== Descendants ==
Herbert's sons, Edward and Henry, both in turn succeeded him but left no male heirs. His daughter Frances was unmarried. His daughter, Florence, married a cousin, Richard Herbert (died 1676), of Oakly Park, Shropshire. Their son Francis Herbert (died 1719) was the father of Henry Herbert, 1st Earl of Powis, and of Urania Herbert (died 1776), who married Coulson Fellowes. She left two sons and a daughter, Urania Fellowes, who married John Wallop, 2nd Earl of Portsmouth (1742–1797).

== See also ==
- Herbert family

== Notes ==
Peerage of Ireland
Preceded by Edward Herbert	Baron Herbert of Castle Island; 1648–1655	Succeeded by Edward Herbert
Peerage of England
Preceded by Edward Herbert	Baron Herbert of Chirbury; 1648–1655	Succeeded by Edward Herbert
