= Baron Herbert of Chirbury =

Barony in the Peerage of Great Britain

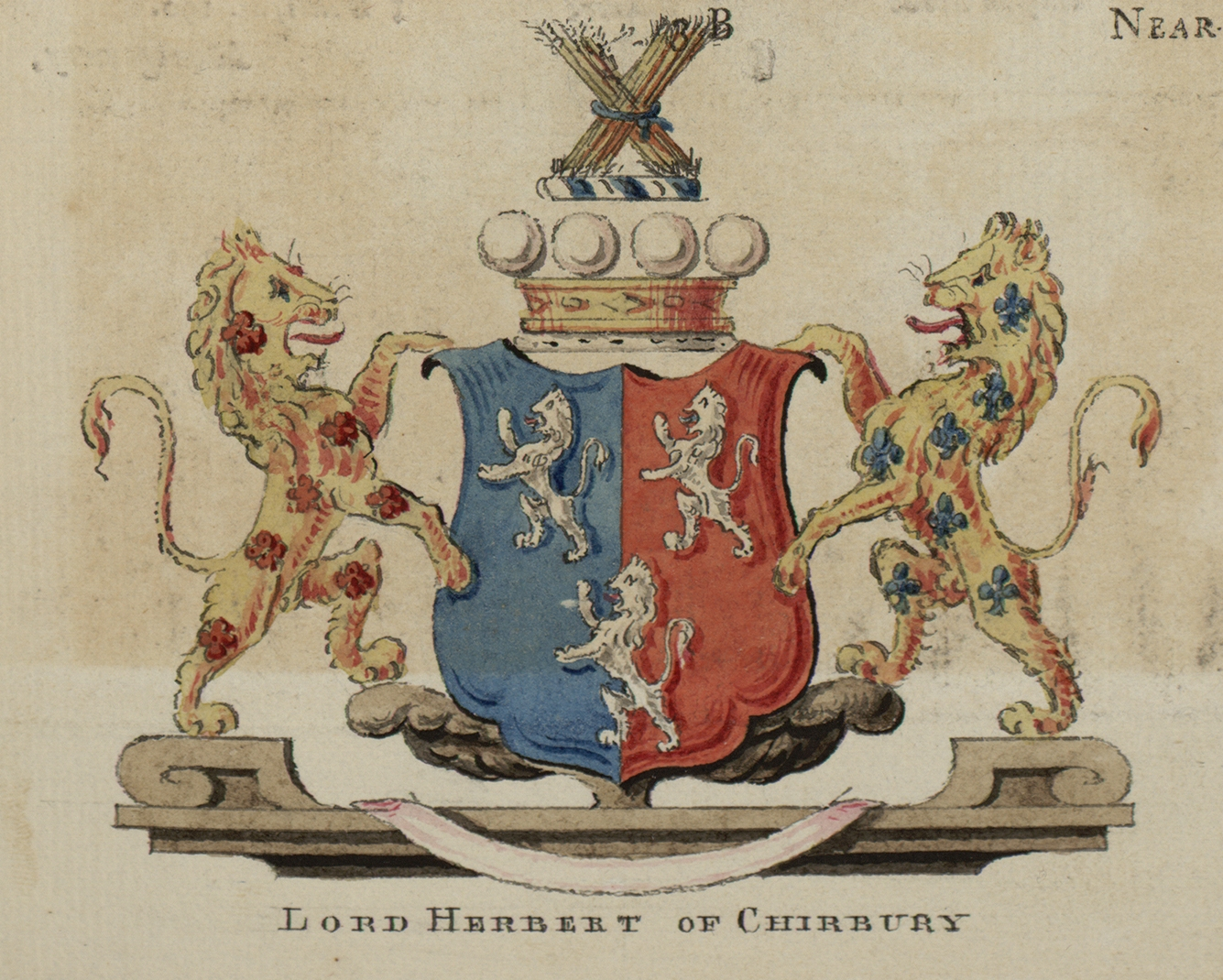
Arms of the Herberts of Chirbury

The title of Baron Herbert of Chirbury was created five times, twice in the Peerage of England, twice in the Peerage of Great Britain and once in the Peerage of the United Kingdom.

The title of Baron Herbert of Castle Island was created once in the Peerage of Ireland on 31 December 1624 for the Anglo-Welsh soldier, diplomat and poet Edward Herbert, who was created Baron Herbert of Cherbury, in the Peerage of England, on 7 May 1629. Both baronies became extinct on the death of the fourth baron in 1691.

The second English creation of the barony of Herbert of Chirbury was for Henry Herbert on 28 April 1694. On the second baron's death in 1738, the barony became extinct.

Both British creations (21 December 1743 and 16 October 1749) were for Henry Arthur Herbert and subsidiary titles of the earldom of Powis (creation of 1748). This creation of the barony became extinct together with the earldom in 1801.

The UK creation was for Edward Clive, 2nd Baron Clive of Plassey on 18 May 1804. And again, it was a subsidiary title of the earldom of Powis (creation of 1804).

There is a large public house in the village of Chirbury, Shropshire, called The Herbert Arms.

== Baron Herbert of Castle Island (1624) ==
- Edward Herbert, 1st Baron Herbert of Castle Island (created Baron Herbert of Chirbury in 1629)

== Baron Herbert of Chirbury, first creation (1629) ==
- Edward Herbert, 1st Baron Herbert of Chirbury (1583–1648)
- Richard Herbert, 2nd Baron Herbert of Chirbury (c. 1604 – 1655)
- Edward Herbert, 3rd Baron Herbert of Chirbury (1633–1678)
- Henry Herbert, 4th Baron Herbert of Chirbury (c. 1640 – 1691)

== Baron Herbert of Chirbury, second creation (1694) ==
- Henry Herbert, 1st Baron Herbert of Chirbury (1654–1709)
- Henry Herbert, 2nd Baron Herbert of Chirbury (a. 1678 – 1738)

== Baron Herbert of Chirbury, third and fourth creations (1743, 1749) ==
- Henry Arthur Herbert, 1st Earl of Powis, 1st Baron Herbert of Chirbury (c. 1703 – 1772)
- For further holders of these titles, see Earl of Powis, first creation.

== Baron Herbert of Chirbury, fifth creation (1804) ==
- Edward Clive, 2nd Baron Clive, 1st Earl of Powis, 1st Baron Herbert of Chirbury (1754–1839)
- For further holders of this title, see Earl of Powis, second creation.

== Title succession chart ==
Title succession chart, Barons Powis, Barons Herbert of Castle Island, Barons Herbert of Chirbury, Barons Clive, Earls of Powis, and Marquesses of Powis.

William ap Thomas died 1445
Earl of Pembroke (8th creation)
William Herbert; 1st Earl of Pembroke c. 1423 – 1469
William Herbert; 2nd Earl of Pembroke; 1451–1491	Sir Richard Herbert died 1510	Richard Herbert of Coldbrook died 1469
Title surrendered to the Crown 1479
Earl of Pembroke (10th creation); Baron Herbert of Cardiff
William Herbert; 1st Earl of Pembroke c. 1501 – 1570	Sir Richard Herbert
Henry Herbert; 2nd Earl of Pembroke c. 1539 – 1601	Sir Edward Herbert; 1544–1595	Edward Herbert c. 1513 – 1593
For descendants, see Earl of Pembroke
Baron Powis (1629)
William Herbert; 1st Baron Powis c. 1573 – 1655	Richard Herbert; Lord of Cherbury; 1557–1596	Mathew Herbert
Baron Herbert of Castle Island (1624); Baron Herbert of Chirbury (first creation, 1629)
Percy Herbert; 2nd Baron Powis; 1598–1667	Edward Herbert; 1st Baron Herbert of Cherbury; 1583–1648	Sir Henry Herbert; Master of the Revels; 1595–1673	Francis Herbert
Earl of Powis (first creation, 1674)
Marquess of Powis (1687)	Baron Herbert of Chirbury (second creation, 1694)
William Herbert; 1st Marquess of Powis; 1st Earl of Powis; 1626–1696	Richard Herbert; 2nd Baron Herbert of Chirbury c. 1604 – 1655	Henry Herbert; 1st Baron Herbert of Chirbury; 1654–1709
William Herbert; 2nd Marquess of Powis; 1665–1745	Edward Herbert; 3rd Baron Herbert of Chirbury; 1633–1678	Hon. Florentia Herbert; 1637–1694	Henry Herbert; 4th Baron Herbert of Chirbury c. 1640 – 1691	Henry Herbert; 2nd Baron Herbert of Chirbury died 1738	Richard Herbert c. 1629 – 1676
Baronies extinct	Barony extinct
William Herbert; 3rd Marquess of Powis; 1698–1748	Lord Edward Herbert died 1734	Francis Herbert; 1667–1719
Barony, earldom and marquessate extinct
Baron Herbert of Chirbury (third creation, 1743); Baron Herbert of Chirbury and Ludlow (1749); Earl of Powis (second creation, 1748)	Baron Clive (first creation, 1762)
Barbara Herbert; 1735–1786	Henry Herbert; 1st Earl of Powis; 1703–1772	Robert Clive; 1st Baron Clive "Clive of India"; 1725–1774
Baron Clive (second creation, 1794)
Baron Herbert of Chirbury (fifth creation, 1804); Earl of Powis (third creation, 1804)
George Herbert; 2nd Earl of Powis; 1755–1801	Lady Henrietta Herbert; 1758–1830	Edward Clive; 1st Earl of Powis; 1754–1839
1743 barony and earldom extinct
Edward Herbert; 2nd Earl of Powis; 1785–1848
Edward Herbert; 3rd Earl of Powis; 1818–1891	Hon. Percy Egerton Herbert; 1822–1876	Very Rev. Hon. George Herbert; 1825–1894	Hon. Robert Herbert; 1827–1902	Maj. Gen. Hon. William Herbert; 1834–1909
Henry Herbert; 1861–1865	George Herbert; 4th Earl of Powis; 1862–1952	Col. Edward Herbert; 1855–1924	Lt. Col. Graham Herbert; 1856–1917	Arthur Herbert; 1866–1907	Henry Herbert; 1882–1911	Rt. Rev. Percy Herbert; 1885–1968
Percy Herbert; Viscount Clive; 1892–1916	Mervyn Herbert; Viscount Clive; 1904–1943	Edward Herbert; 5th Earl of Powis; 1889–1974	Christian Herbert; 6th Earl of Powis; 1904–1988	George Herbert; 7th Earl of Powis; 1925–1993
John Herbert; 8th Earl of Powis born 1952
Jonathan Herbert; Viscount Clive born 1979
