= Edward Herbert, 3rd Baron Herbert of Chirbury =

English aristocrat and soldier

Edward Herbert, 3rd Baron Herbert of Chirbury (1633-1678) was an English aristocrat and soldier.

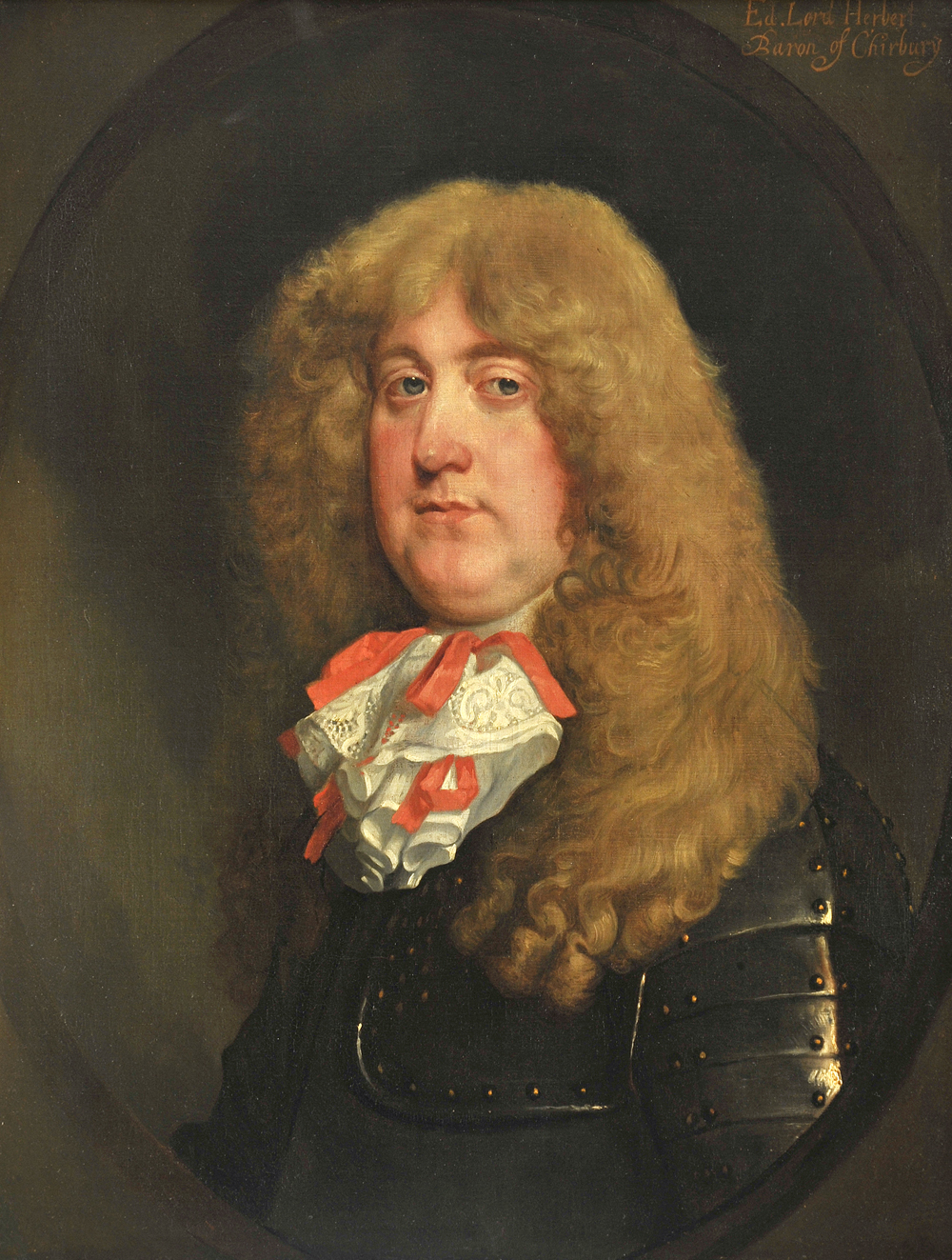
Edward Herbert, 3rd Baron Herbert of Chirbury, portrait by Gerard Soest.

== Life ==
He was the elder son of Richard Herbert, 2nd Baron Herbert of Chirbury. He joined the royalist uprising under Sir George Booth, when he declared for Charles II in Cheshire in 1659, and suffered a short imprisonment. After the Restoration he was made custos rotulorum of Montgomeryshire (24 August 1660), and Denbighshire (1666).

Richard Davies a Quaker, of Welshpool in Montgomeryshire, often appealed to Herbert in behalf of coreligionists committed to prison; and Herbert was sympathetic. He was, Davies says, a very big fat man.

Herbert corresponded frequently with his great-uncle, Sir Henry Herbert. He died 9 December 1678, and was buried in St Edmund's Chapel, Westminster Abbey. He built a half timbered mansion in Lymore Park, which was completed in 1677, the year before his death. Lymore lies to the east-southeast of Montgomery, and the house was largely demolished in 1931

== Family ==
Herbert married firstly Anne, daughter of Sir Thomas Myddelton of Chirk Castle, and secondly, Elizabeth, daughter of George Brydges, 6th Baron Chandos, but had no issue.

Peerage of Ireland
Preceded by Richard Herbert	Baron Herbert of Castle Island; 1655–1678	Succeeded by Henry Herbert
Peerage of England
Preceded by Richard Herbert	Baron Herbert of Chirbury; 1655–1678	Succeeded by Henry Herbert
