= Isaac Oliver =

English painter (c. 1565–1617)

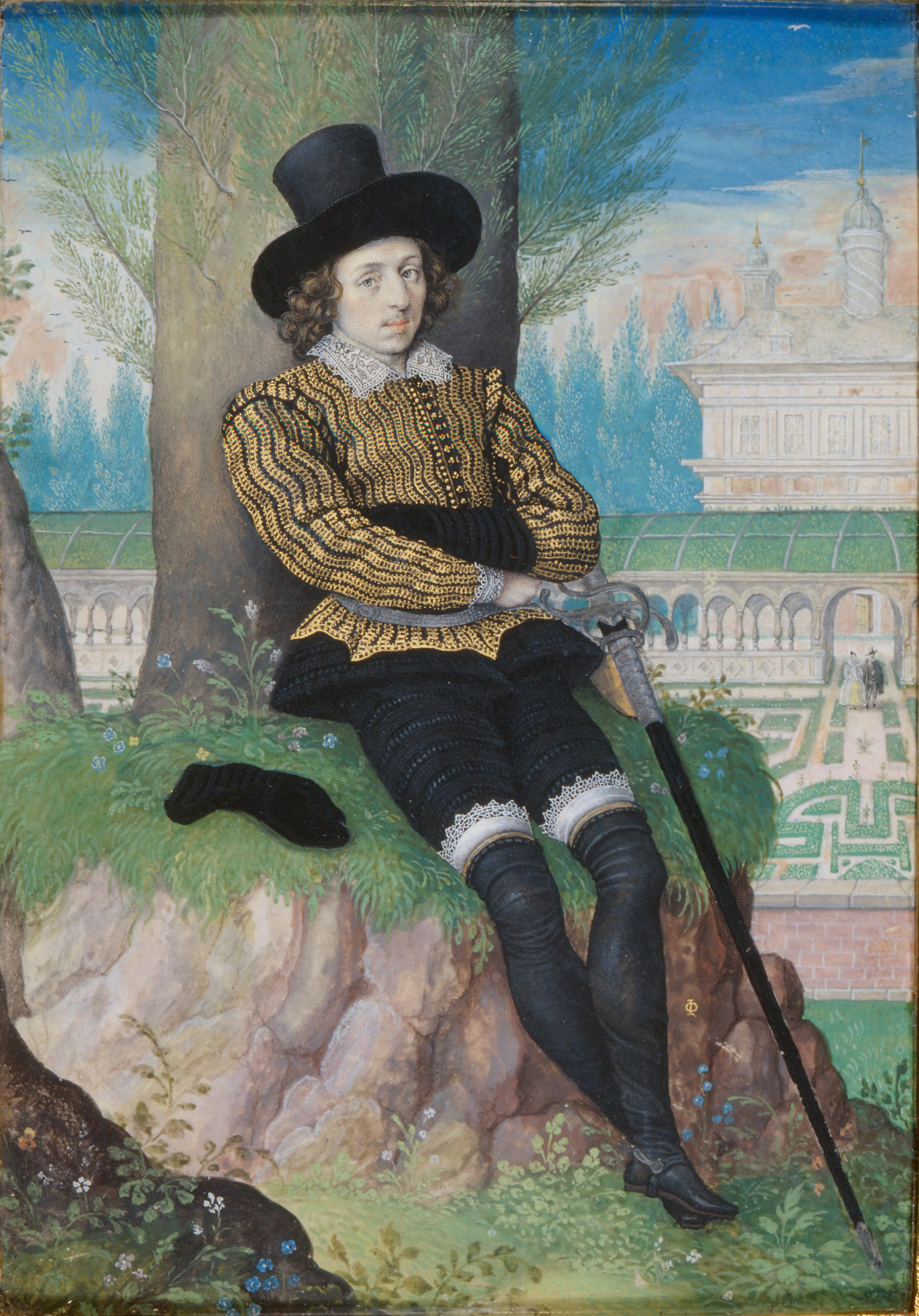
Young Man Seated under a Tree, c. 1590–1595, Royal Collection

Isaac Oliver (or Olivier; c. 1565 – bur. 2 October 1617) was an English portrait miniature painter.

== Life and work ==
Born in Rouen around 1565, he moved to London in 1568 with his Huguenot parents Peter and Epiphany Oliver to escape the Wars of Religion in France. He then studied miniature painting under Nicholas Hilliard; and developed a naturalistic style, which was largely influenced by Italian and Flemish art. His first wife, Elizabeth, died in 1599. With her he fathered Peter Oliver, who was also eminent in miniature painting. In 1602, he married Sara, daughter of the well-known portrait painter Marcus Gheeraerts the Elder (c. 1520 – c. 1590) and his wife Susannah de Critz. Susannah was the daughter of Troilus de Critz, a goldsmith from Antwerp, and close relative of John de Critz, the Queen's Serjeant-Painter. She was also the eldest sister or cousin of Magdalen de Critz, who married Marcus Gheeraerts the Younger (1562–1635).

After the death of Elizabeth I, he became a painter of James I's court, painting numerous portraits of the queen Anne of Denmark and Henry Frederick, Prince of Wales. He accompanied Anne of Denmark on her progresses in Oxfordshire, Berkshire, and Kent in 1605, and was appointed "her Majesties painter in the art of lymning".

Oliver died in London in 1617 and was buried at the church of St Ann Blackfriars, which was destroyed in the Great Fire of London.

Some of his work is housed in Windsor Castle. Some of his pen drawings are located in the British Museum.

== Gallery ==
=== Portrait miniatures ===
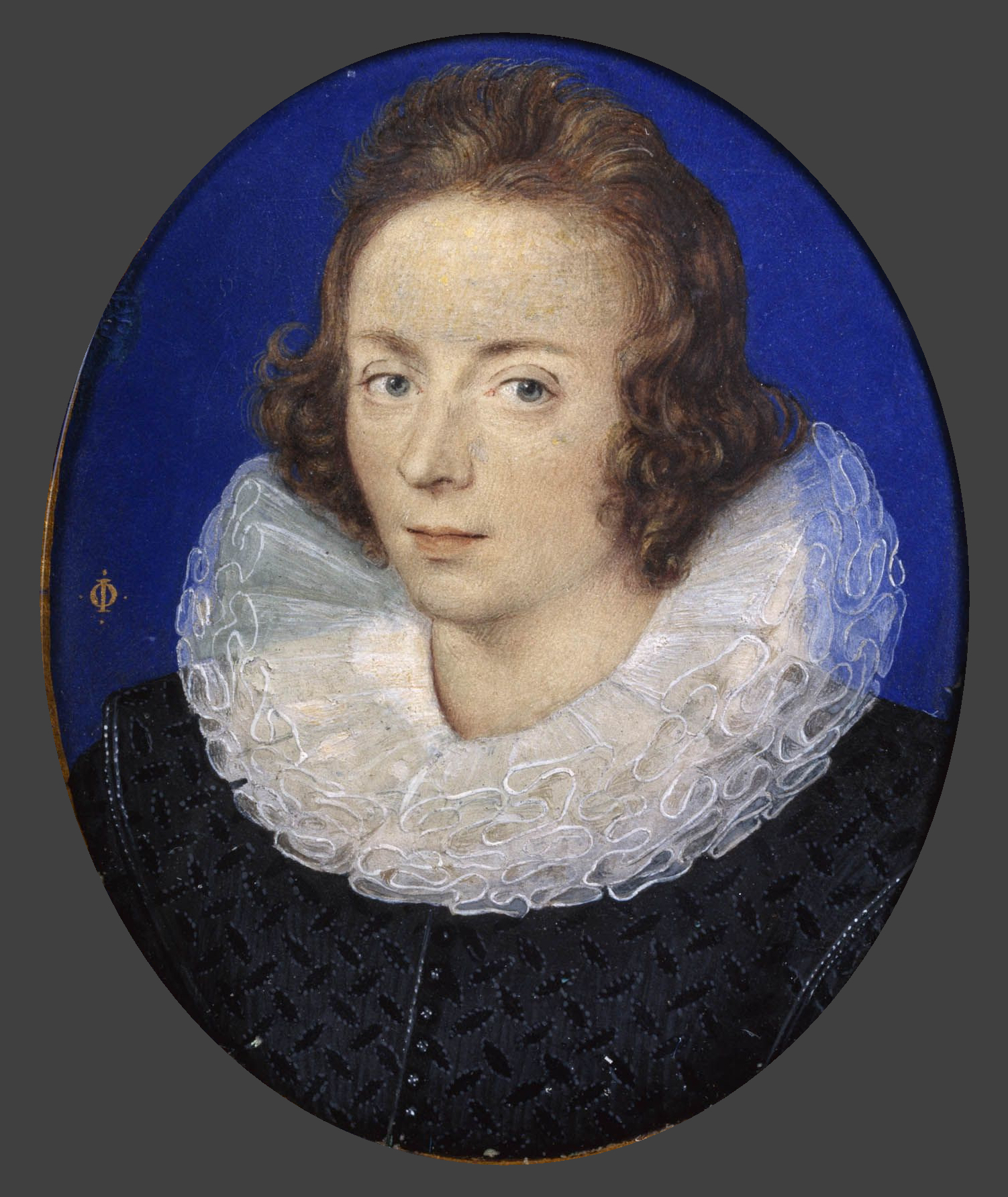
Portrait of a Young Gentleman (possibly Sir Philip Sydney), 1605

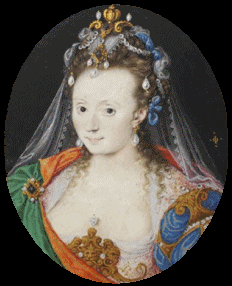
Unknown Woman in Masque Costume, 1609

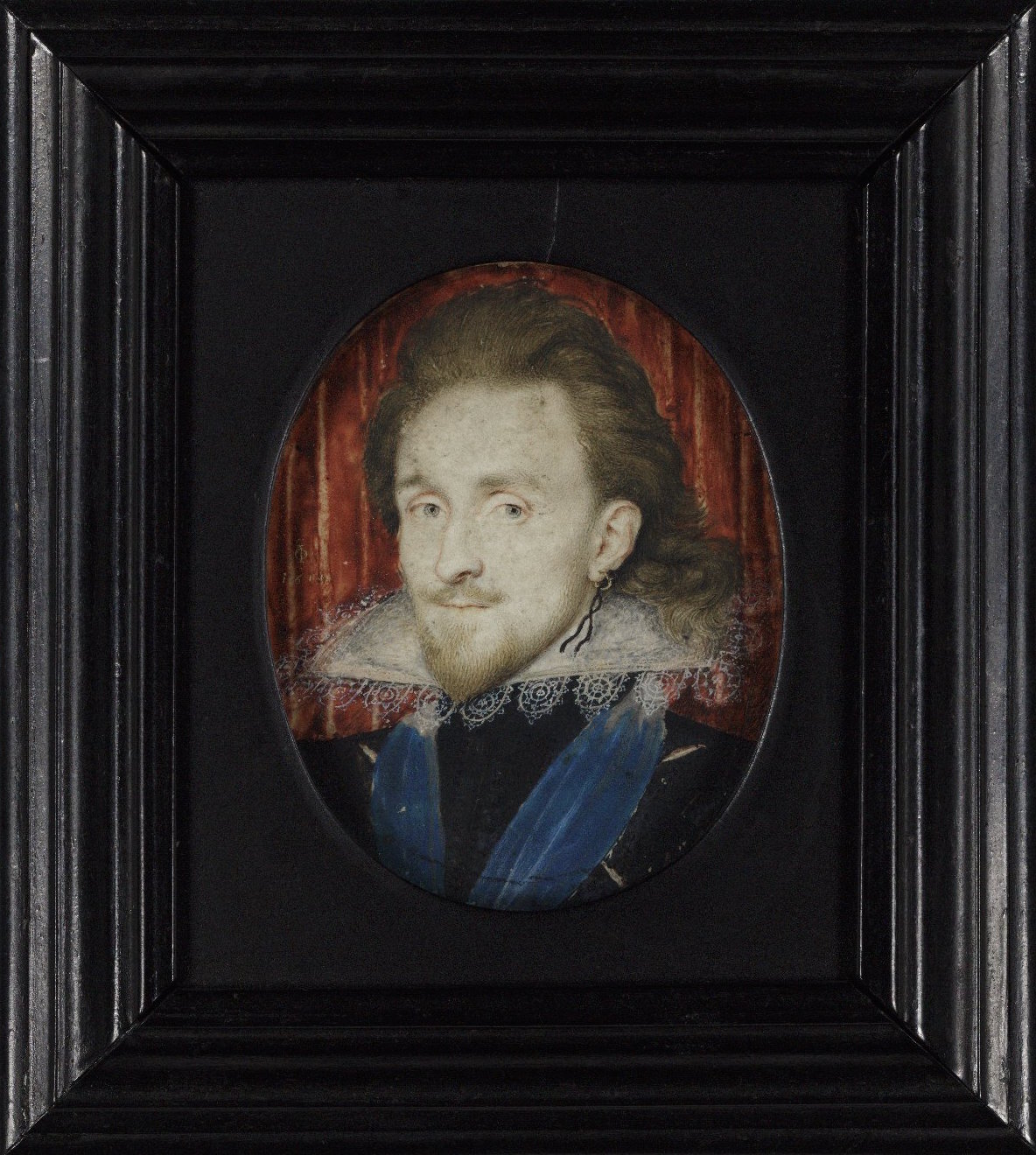
Philip Herbert, Fourth Earl of Pembroke, 1611

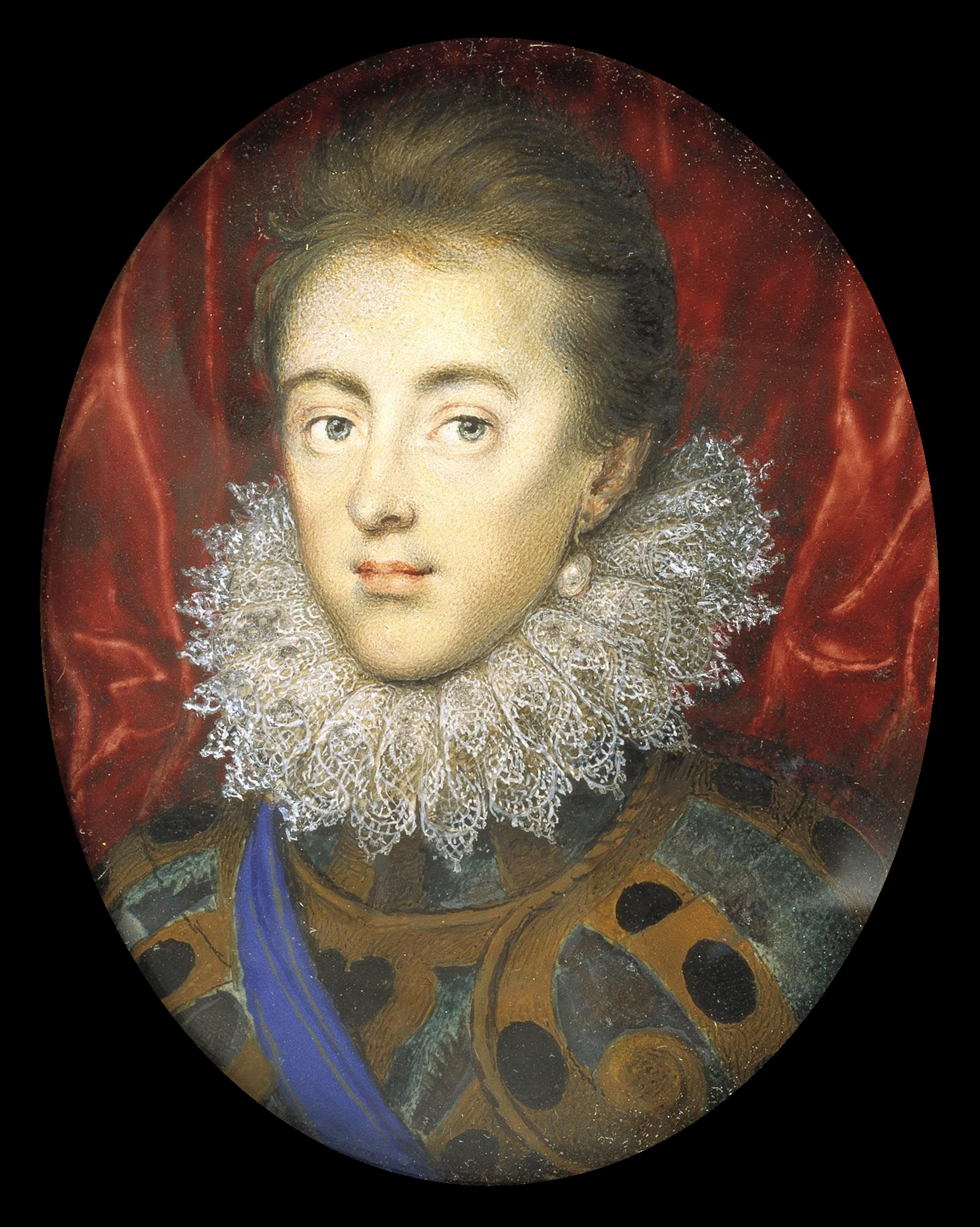
Charles I as Prince of Wales, 1615

=== Larger works ===
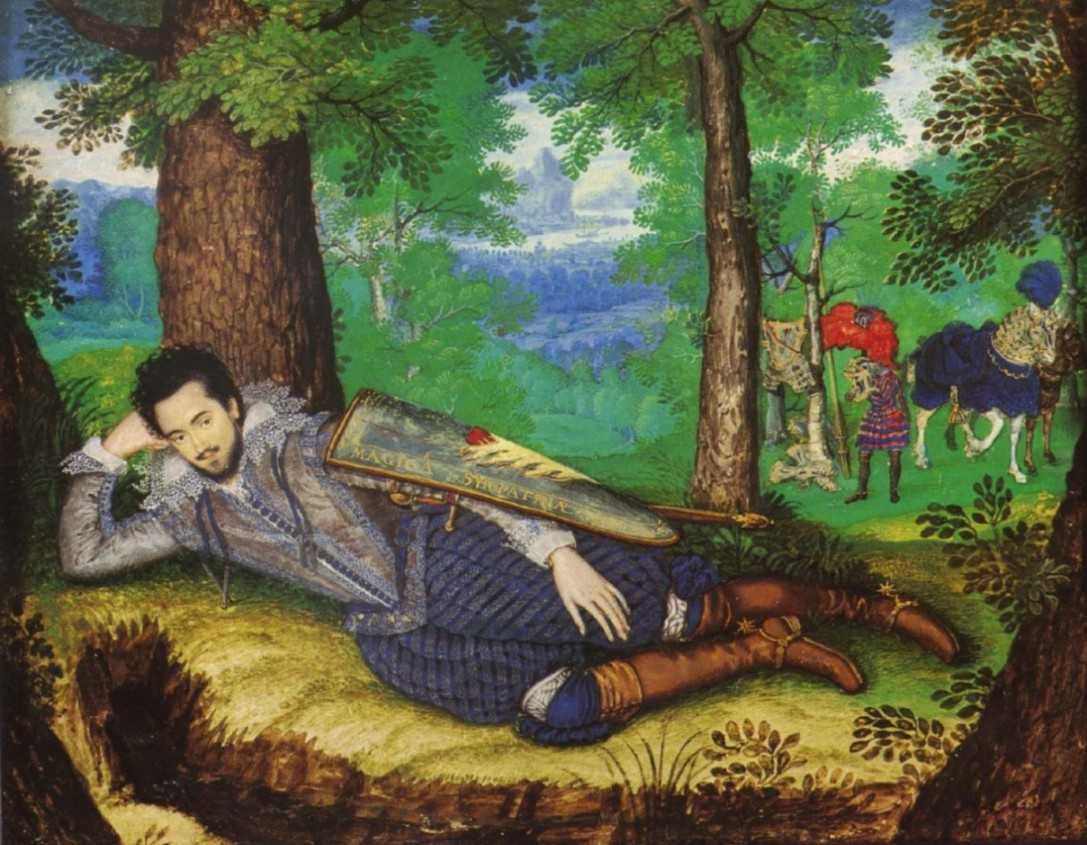
Edward Herbert, 1st Baron Herbert of Cherbury

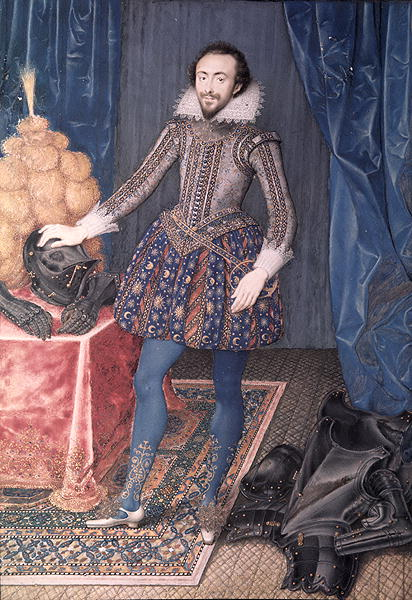
Richard Sackville, 3rd Earl of Dorset, cabinet miniature, 1616

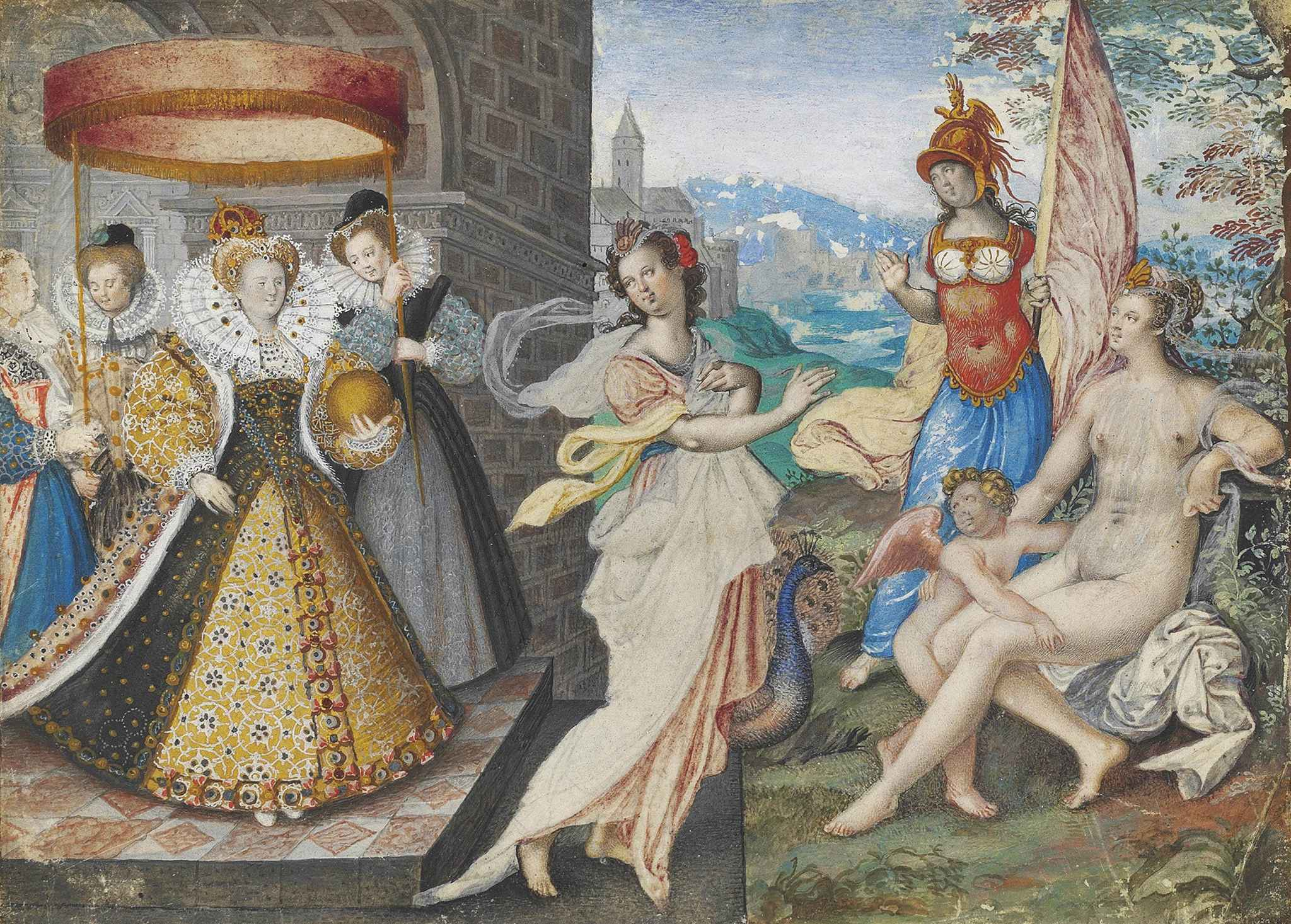
Elizabeth I and the three Goddesses Juno, Minerva & Venus

== See also ==
- List of British artists
