= Henry Herbert, 4th Baron Herbert of Chirbury =

English aristocrat, soldier and politician

Henry Herbert, 4th Baron Herbert of Chirbury (died 1691) was an English aristocrat, soldier and politician.

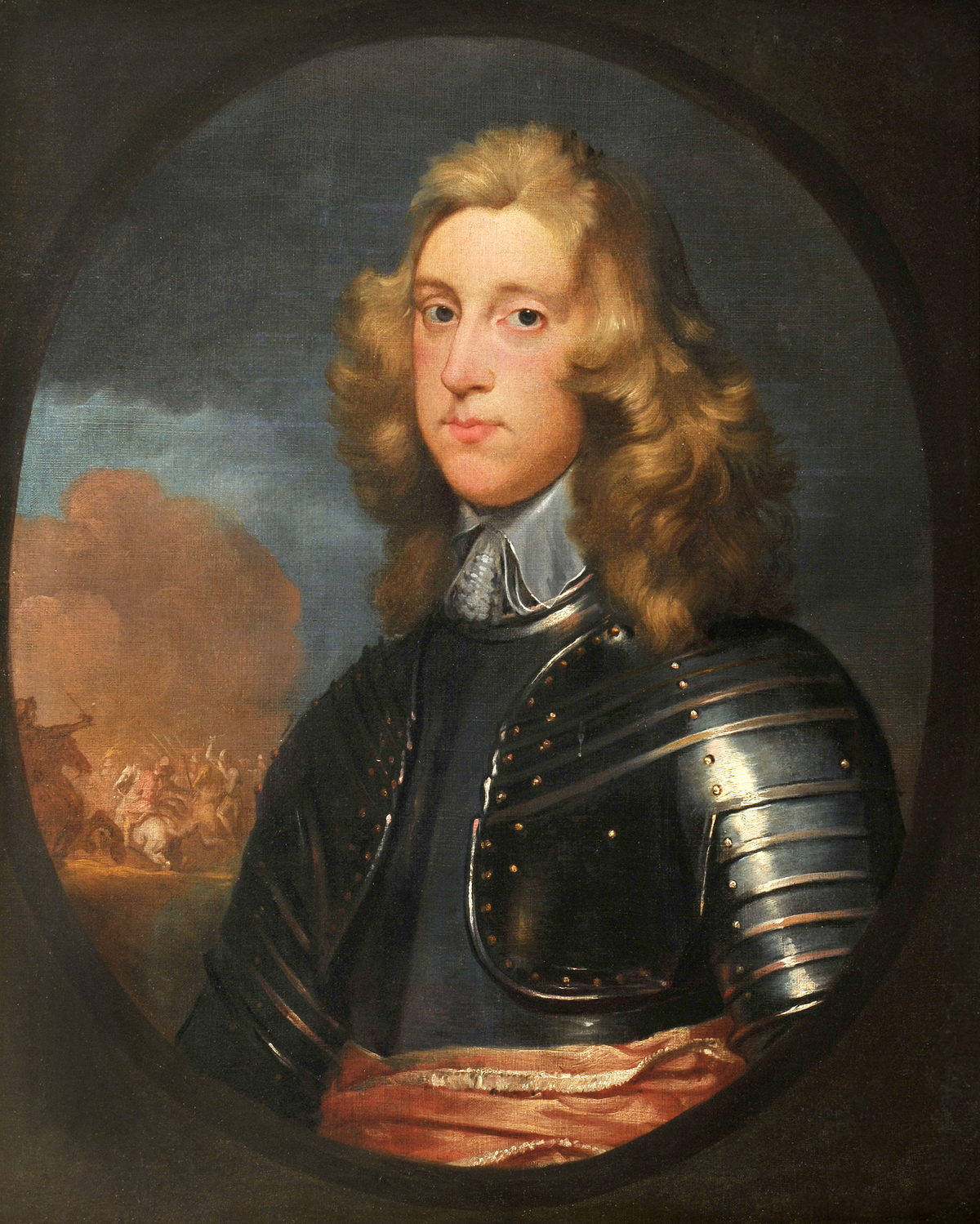
Henry Herbert as a young man, portrait by Gerard Soest, at Powis Castle.

== Life ==
He was associated with George Booth's royalist rising in 1659, and served under the Duke of Monmouth, as captain of a troop of horse in the service of France in 1672.

On his death of his brother Edward Herbert, 3rd Baron Herbert of Chirbury in 1678, Henry Herbert succeeded to the barony. He withdrew from the army, was made custos rotulorum of Montgomeryshire 20 December 1679, and joined the party of the Duke of Monmouth, in opposition to James, Duke of York. On 5 January 1680 he was one of the petitioners who demanded the summoning of parliament with a view to passing the Exclusion Bill, and he later joined his cousin Henry Herbert (1654–1709) in promoting the Glorious Revolution. He was made cofferer of the household to William III and Mary II.

Herbert married Lady Catherine, daughter of Francis Newport, 1st Earl of Bradford, and died without issue in 1691. He left all his property to his nephew Francis of Oakly Park, Shropshire, son of his sister Florentia or Florence, by Richard Herbert of Dolguog. Francis Herbert's son, Henry Arthur Herbert, was created Lord Herbert of Cherbury and Earl of Powis in 1748.

== Notes ==
Attribution

This article incorporates text from a publication now in the public domain: "Herbert, Edward (1583-1648)". Dictionary of National Biography. London: Smith, Elder & Co. 1885–1900.

Peerage of Ireland
Preceded by Edward Herbert	Baron Herbert of Castle Island; 1678–1691	Extinct
Peerage of England
Preceded by Edward Herbert	Baron Herbert of Chirbury; 1678–1691	Extinct
