= Bear and Ragged Staff =

British heraldic emblem

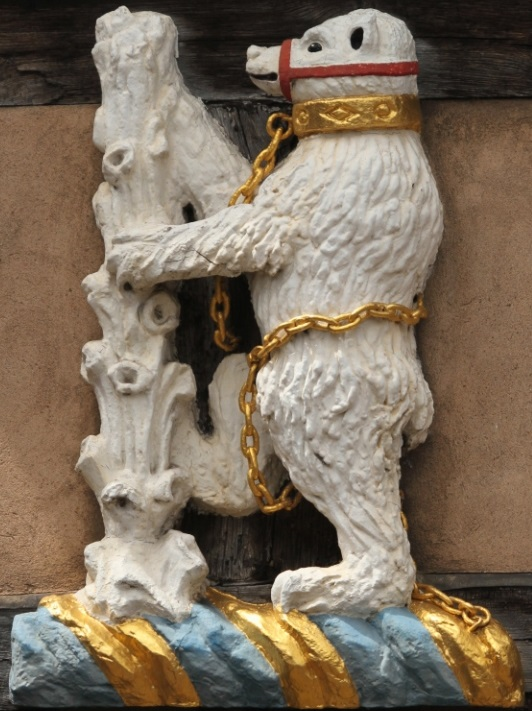
Bear and Ragged Staff heraldic motif used by the Earls of Warwick, from the Lord Leycester Hospital in Warwick.

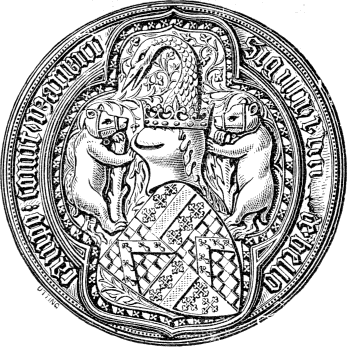
Seal of Richard Beauchamp, 13th Earl of Warwick (1382–1439), with Bear and Ragged Staff quasi-supporters to his couched heraldic shield

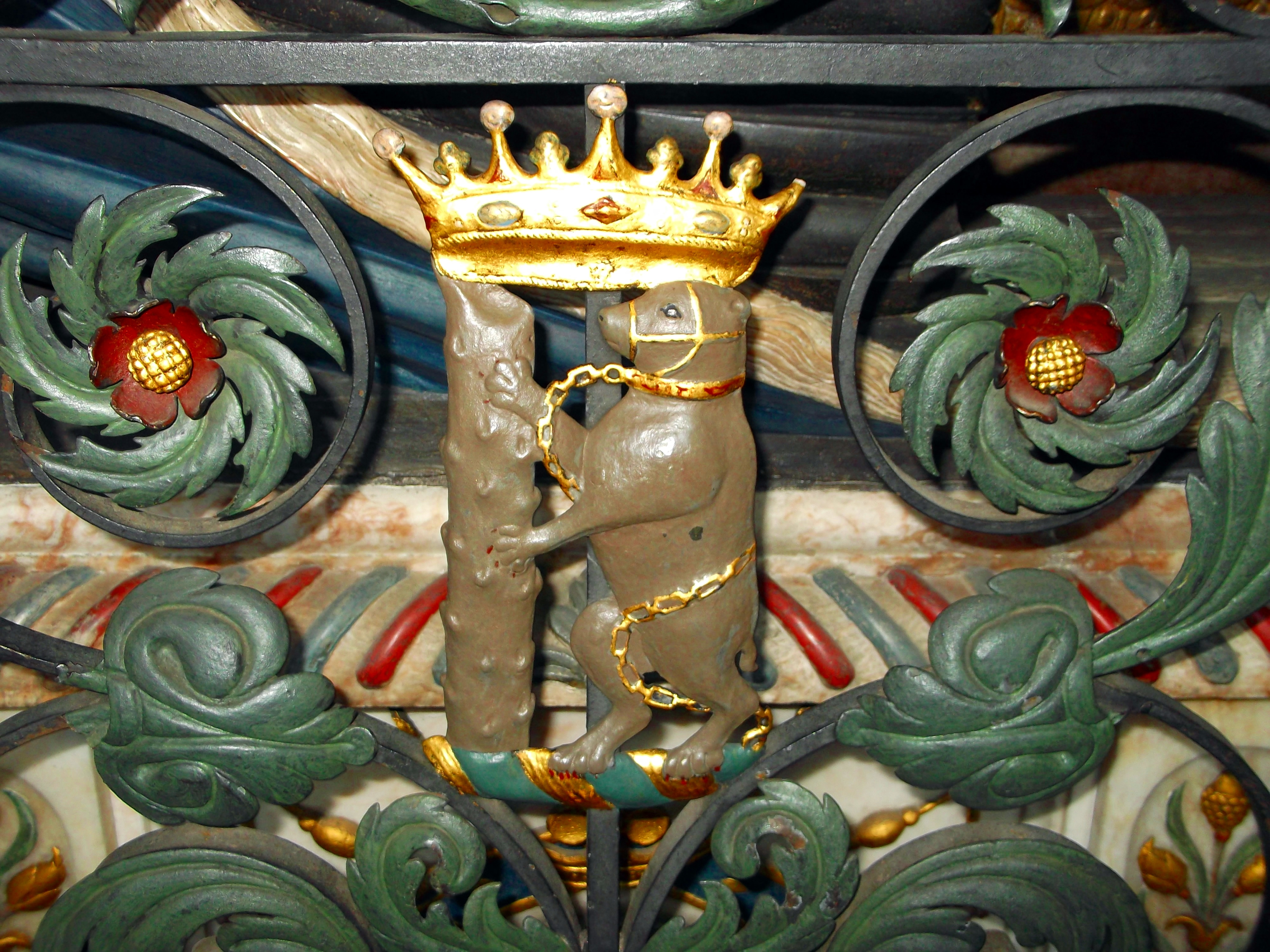
Bear and Raggd Staff, detail from monument to Robert Dudley, 1st Earl of Leicester in the Collegiate Church of St Mary, Warwick

The Bear and Ragged Staff is a heraldic emblem or badge associated with the Earldom of Warwick.

The Ragged Staff is believed to refer to Morvidus, an early legendary Earl of Warwick who is said to have slain a giant "with a young ash tree torn up by the roots."

The emblem of a bear (Latin ursus) is believed to refer to Urse d'Abetot (c. 1040 – 1108), 1st feudal baron of Salwarpe in Worcestershire, a Norman who followed King William the Conqueror to England, and served as Sheriff of Worcestershire. His heir was his son-in-law Walter de Beauchamp (died 1130/3), whose descendant was William de Beauchamp, 9th Earl of Warwick (c.1238–1298), the eldest son of William de Beauchamp of Elmley by his wife Isabel de Mauduit, sister and heiress of William Mauduit, 8th Earl of Warwick.

Turnbull (1995) however suggests that the bear emblem came from another early legendary Earl of Warwick named Arthal, which he suggests signifies "a bear".

Similarly the proto-heraldic emblem of Sir Reginald FitzUrse (1145–1173), one of the four knights who murdered Thomas Becket in 1170, was a bear.

The emblem was also adopted by Robert Dudley, 1st Earl of Leicester (1532–1588) of Kenilworth Castle in Warwickshire, younger brother of Ambrose Dudley, 3rd Earl of Warwick, descended from Richard Beauchamp, 13th Earl of Warwick (1382–1439) and especially fascinated by his Beauchamp descent. His monument in the Collegiate Church of St Mary, Warwick, displays the Bear and Ragged Staff emblem.

The emblem is today used on the flag of the historic county of Warwickshire.
