= Walter de Beauchamp (justice) =

English judge

Arms of Beauchamp: Gules, a fesse between six cross crosslets or

Walter II de Beauchamp (1192/3 – 1236), of Elmley Castle in Worcestershire (12 miles south-east of the City of Worcester), was hereditary Sheriff of Worcestershire.

== Origins ==
He was the second son and eventual heir of William II de Beauchamp (d.1197) of Elmley, hereditary constable of Worcester Castle and hereditary Sheriff of Worcestershire, who died when Walter was aged about 5, when his wardship and marriage was acquired firstly by William de Braose, and secondly, for the sum of 3,000 marks, by Roger Mortimer (d. 1214) of Wigmore Castle.

=== Early origins ===
He was the great-grandson of Walter I de Beauchamp (d.1133) of Elmley Castle, hereditary Sheriff of Worcestershire, who married Emmeline d'Abetot, daughter and heiress of Urse d'Abetot (c.1040-1108), feudal baron of Salwarpe in Worcestershire and Sheriff of Worcestershire in about 1069. Walter I de Beauchamp inherited his father-in-law's barony and also inherited Elmley Castle and other estates (held from the Bishop of Worcester) from his wife's uncle Robert d'Abetot.

== Career ==
Walter's elder brother William died before Michaelmas 1211, leaving Walter as his heir, then aged 19. In 1212, still not having reached the age of majority (i.e. 21), he was married to Johanna Mortimer (d.1225), his warder's daughter. He was in possession of his barony by 1214. He obtained his father's hereditary office of Sheriff of Worcestershire on 19 August 1215, but lost it in May 1216 when, with nineteen of his knights, he deserted to the rebels. He returned to his allegiance to King John in August 1216, and was reinstated in his lands. Walter was a witness at the re-issue of Magna Carta on 11 November 1216 and in March 1217 he was restored by King Henry III to his shrievalty and castellanship, and became Keeper of the Royal Forests in Worcestershire. He witnessed the further re-issue of Magna Carta on 11 February 1225.

The office of Sheriff was inheritable in only three counties. The Beauchamps viewed the office as an asset, and extracted taxes to their own benefit, ensuring that little or no money due to the Crown was paid to it. He was removed from office in 1229, but reinstated within a year. No money was paid in 1224-8 and none from 1229-35, including arrears.

== Marriages and children ==
He married twice:

- Firstly, in 1212 at the age of 20, to Joan Mortimer (d. 1225), daughter of his warder Roger Mortimer (d. 1214) of Wigmore Castle, by whom he had issue including:
  - William (III) de Beauchamp (1215–1269), eldest son and heir, who married Isabel de Mauduit, sister and heiress of William Mauduit, 8th Earl of Warwick, by whom he was the father of William de Beauchamp, 9th Earl of Warwick.
- Secondly, in 1225 or later, he married a certain Angaret (d. 1280/3), of unrecorded family.

== Death ==
Walter died on 11 April 1236.

== Sources ==
- Hillaby, Joe (1990). "The Worcester Jewry 1158-1290". Transactions of the Worcester Archaeological Society. 12: 73–122.
- Mason, Emma, ed. (1980). The Beauchamp Cartulary Charters 1100-1268. New Series. Vol. XLII. London: Roll Society.
- Mason, Emma (2004). "Beauchamp, Walter de (1192/3–1236), justice". Oxford Dictionary of National Biography (online ed.). Oxford University Press. doi:10.1093/ref:odnb/1842. (Subscription, Wikipedia Library access or UK public library membership required.)
- Sanders, I.J. (1960). English Baronies: A Study of their Origin and Descent 1086-1327. Oxford: Clarendon Press. OL 20567815M.
