= Walter de Beauchamp (Steward to Edward I) =

Arms of Walter de Beauchamp (Beauchamp of Beauchamp's Court, Alcester; Powick and Bletsoe): Gules, a fess between six martlets or, a difference of the senior line of Beauchamp of Elmley, Earl of Warwick

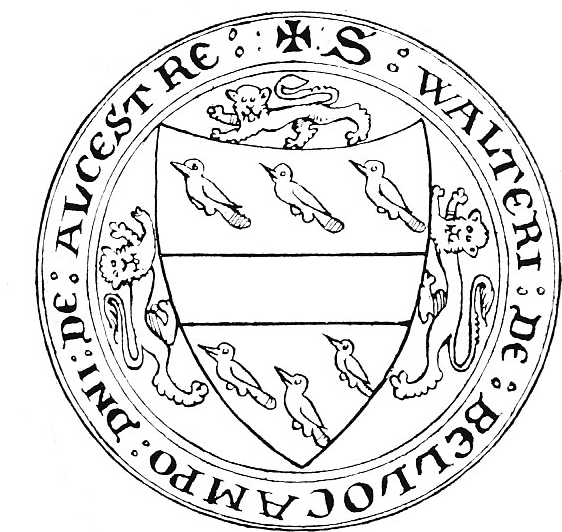
Seal of Walter de Beauchamp (d.1303) of Alcester, appended to the Barons' Letter of 1301. Legend: S(igillum) Walteri de Bello Campo D(omi)ni de Alcestre ("seal of Walter de Beauchamp, Lord of Alcester")

Walter de Beauchamp (died 1303/06), (Latinised to de Bello Campo) of Beauchamp's Court, Alcester in Warwickshire and of Beauchamp Court, Powick in Worcestershire, was Steward of the Household to King Edward I from 1289 to 1303. He was the younger brother of William de Beauchamp, 9th Earl of Warwick (c.1238-1298), the first of his family to hold that title (inherited from their mother) and was the founder of the junior line of the Beauchamp family known as "Beauchamp of Powick".

== Origins ==
He was a younger son of William III de Beauchamp (c.1215-1269) of Elmley Castle in Worcestershire, hereditary Sheriff of Worcestershire, by his wife Isabel de Mauduit, daughter of William de Mauduit of Hanslope in Buckinghamshire and Hartley Mauditt, Hampshire (by his wife Alice de Beaumont (d. pre- 1263), half-sister of Henry de Beaumont, 5th Earl of Warwick (c.1192-1229)) and sister and heiress of William Mauduit, 8th Earl of Warwick). His eldest brother was William de Beauchamp, 9th Earl of Warwick (c.1238-1298).

== Career ==
By 1268 he had been "signed with the cross" for a pilgrimage to the Holy Land, in which year his father signed his will mentioning Walter as being a crusader to whom he bequeaths 200 marks "for his better performance of that voyage". He was at the Battle of Falkirk in 1298 and at the Siege of Caerlaverock Castle in Scotland in 1300, with the king. He signed and sealed the Barons' Letter of 1301 to the pope as Walt(er)us de Bello Campo, D(omi)n(u)s de Alcestre ("Walter de Beauchamp, Lord of Alcester"). Another of the signatories was his nephew Guy de Beauchamp, 10th Earl of Warwick (c.1272-1315).

=== Caerlaverock Roll ===
At the Siege of Caerlaverock Castle in Scotland in 1300 the heralds blazoned the arms of all the English knights present in Norman-French verse, known as the Caerlaverock Roll. The part regarding "Wautier de Beauchamp" is as follows:

Puis i out Wautier de Beauchamp
Sis merlos de or el rouge champ
O une fesse en lieu de dance
Chevalier selon ma cuidance
Un des mellours fut entre touz
Se il ne fuit trop fiers et estouz
Mes vous ne orrez parler james
De senescal ke ne ait une mes.

Which may be translated as:

"Then there was Walter de Beauchamp, having six martlets of gold with a red field with a fess instead of dancetée (standard blazon: Gules, a fess between six martlets or). He was in my opinion one of the best knights of the whole if he had not been too proud and violent, but you won't hear anyone talk of the steward without a 'but'".

=== Inherits Powick ===
At his father's death in 1269 Walter inherited his family's part of the manor of Powick in Worcestershire, where he made his seat at Beauchamp Court, on the right bank of the River Severn. The estate had been inherited, together with Elmley Castle and other lands, by Walter's three-times great-grandfather Walter I de Beauchamp (d. 1130/1133), founder of the Beauchamp family, on his marriage to Emmeline d'Abitot, daughter and heiress of Urse d'Abitot, Sheriff of Worcestershire. In 1300 he received a royal grant of free warren in his demesne lands of Powick and at some time established a chantry "in the court of his manor" at Powick.

The family he founded is generally referred to as "Beauchamp of Powick" to distinguish it from the other branches, namely the senior branch of Earls of Warwick "Beauchamp of Elmley" and another branch "Beauchamp of Holt". The martlet arms he adopted ("Beauchamp of Powick") as a difference to his paternal arms were also borne by his descendants.

=== Acquires Alcester ===
In about 1263 he acquired a moiety of the manor of Alcester in Warwickshire which he held from Reynold FitzPeter by the tenure of "doing the foreign service of ½ knight's fee". Around 1274, he confirmed to his free burgesses and tenants their ancient right to hold a weekly market on a Tuesday, and also granted them a weekly market on a Thursday, allowing the sale of animals, flesh, wheat, rye, barley, oats, beans, pease, woollen and linen drapery, bread, iron goods, tallow, grease, fish, leather goods, baskets, hides, wool, linen, geese, hens, cheese, bacon, eggs, salt and spices.

In 1291, he received royal licence to cultivate 60 acres of his wood in Alcester within the forest of Feckenham and in 1300 he was granted by the king free warren in his demesne lands of Alcester. In 1292 he obtained a royal grant for an annual fair "on the eve, day and morrow of St. Giles and for five days following". The other moiety of the manor was eventually acquired (from Thomas Botreaux) in 1444 by his descendant John Beauchamp, 1st Baron Beauchamp (d. 1475) "of Powick" in Worcestershire.

== Marriage and children ==
Arms of de Toeni: Argent, a maunch gules

He married Alice de Tosny, a daughter of Roger V de Tosny of Flamstead in Hertfordshire by his wife Alice de Bohun, a daughter of Humphrey IV de Bohun, 2nd Earl of Hereford, 1st Earl of Essex (1204-1275), Hereritary Constable of England. Unbeknownst to themselves they were found to be within the fourth degree of consanguinity, which necessitated a ratification of the marriage by Godfrey Giffard, Bishop of Worcester to legitimise their issue. By his wife he had issue including:

- Walter de Beauchamp (d.1328), of Alcester, eldest son and heir. In 1307 he was fighting the Scots and in 1317 he became the guardian of Warwick Castle and its lands following the death of his cousin Guy de Beauchamp, 10th Earl of Warwick (c. 1272 – 1315) who left an infant son Thomas de Beauchamp, 11th Earl of Warwick (c.1313-1369).
- William de Beauchamp, "a military man of celebrity" who inherited some of his elder brother's lands. In 1320 he was appointed by King Edward II as Governor of St Briavel's Castle in the Forest of Dean, Gloucestershire. He married a certain Joan with whom in 1334 he settled the manors of Powick and Bransford on themselves and their heirs, but he died childless.
- Giles de Beauchamp (d.1361), heir of his eldest brother, who in 1340 received royal licence to crenellate (to fortify with a wall of stone and lime and embattle) his manor house at Alcester, and a similar licence two years later for his house at Freshwater, Isle of Wight. He married Katherine de Bures. His son and heir was Sir John de Beauchamp, who in 1386 was keeper of Gloucester Castle. Giles's great-grandson was John Beauchamp, 1st Baron Beauchamp (d. 1475) "of Powick" in Worcestershire.

== Death ==
He died either in 1303 or 1306.
