= Roger d'Abetot =

11th and 12th-century Norman sheriff and royal official in England

Sheriff of Worcestershire
- In office 1108 – c. 1114
- Preceded by: Urse d'Abetot
- Succeeded by: Osbert d'Abetot

Roger d'Abetot (sometimes Roger of Abitôt) was a medieval English Sheriff of Worcestershire.

Roger was the son of Urse d'Abetot, his predecessor as sheriff. He also held the custody of Worcester Castle, another office he inherited from his father. He may also have been a constable in Henry I's household, as his father had been. Along with the offices, Roger also inherited the feudal barony of Salwarpe in Worcestershire. He was banished from England in around 1110 or in 1114 by King Henry I, and lost his office because of this. His lands were also forfeit. According to the medieval writer William of Malmesbury, Henry exiled him because Roger ordered that a royal official be killed.

The office passed to Osbert d'Abetot, who may have been Roger's uncle, before eventually ending up with Roger's brother-in-law Walter de Beauchamp.

== Sources ==
- Cronne, H. A. & Johnson, Charles (1956). "Introduction". In Cronne, H. A. & Johnson, Charles (eds.). Regesta Regum Anglo-Normannorum 1066–1154. Vol. II: Regesta Henriici Primi 1100–1135. Oxford, UK: Clarendon Press. pp. ix–xlvi. OCLC 634967597.
- Green, Judith A. (1997). The Aristocracy of Norman England. Cambridge, UK: Cambridge University Press. ISBN 0-521-52465-2.
- Hollister, C. Warren (2001). Frost, Amanda Clark (ed.). Henry I. New Haven, CT: Yale University Press. ISBN 0-300-08858-2.
- Keats-Rohan, K. S. B. (1999). Domesday People: A Prosopography of Persons Occurring in English Documents, 1066–1166: Domesday Book. Ipswich, UK: Boydell Press. ISBN 0-85115-722-X.
- Round, J. H. (2004). "Abetot, Urse d' (c.1040–1108)". Oxford Dictionary of National Biography. revised by Emma Mason. Oxford University Press. (subscription, Wikipedia Library access or UK public library membership required)
- Sanders, I. J. (1960). English Baronies: A Study of Their Origin and Descent 1086–1327. Oxford, UK: Clarendon Press. OCLC 931660.
