= List of Henry's new men =

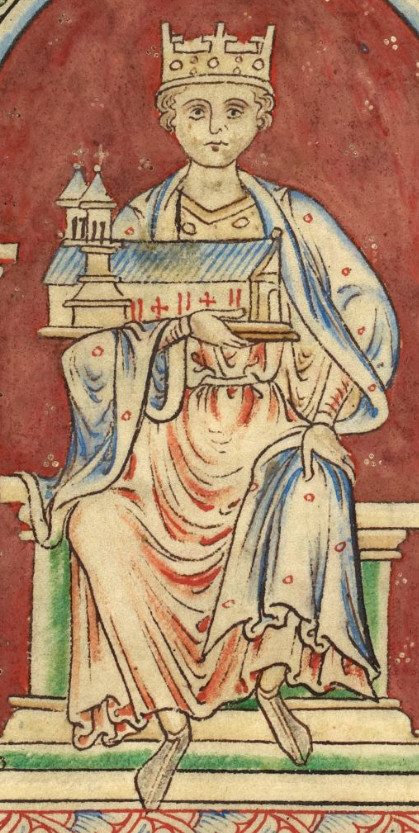
Miniature of Henry I of England

Henry's new men are considered by historians to be those men that rose to prominence during the reign of Henry I of England (reigned 1100–1135) and whose families had not previously been prominent in royal service.

== Overview ==
Although the use of the actual phrase "new men" dates from the writings of William Stubbs around 1874, the group of men was first singled out in the writings of writers contemporary with the men. The chronicler Orderic Vitalis in his Historia Ecclesiastica said that Henry had "ennobled others of base stock who had served him well, raised them, so to say, from the dust, and heaping all kinds of favours on them, stationed them above earls and famous constables." Orderic went on to mention a number of men that he considered "new men".

Orderic's list of new men included:

- Geoffrey de Clinton
- Ralph Basset
- Hugh of Buckland
- Guillegrip
- Rainer of Bath
- William Trussebut
- Haimo of Falaise
- Wigan Algason
- Robert of Bostare

The medieval writer Henry of Huntingdon, writing in his De Contemptu Mundi, mentioned a number of the above and added:

- Richard Basset
- Geoffrey Ridel

The author of the Gesta Stephani, a chronicle of the reign of King Stephen of England, Henry's successor, named the following as new men during Henry's reign:

- Pain fitzJohn
- Miles of Gloucester

To these men, the modern historian H. F. Doherty, writing for the Oxford Dictionary of National Biography, adds:

- Eustace fitzJohn
- Walter de Beauchamp
- John Marshall
- Brien fitzCount

The historian and biographer of Henry I, Judith Green adds the following:

- William de Pont-del-l'Arche
- Osbert the priest
- Richard of Winchester
- Nigel d'Aubigny
- Roger of Salisbury
