= Worcester Castle =

Norman fortification built between 1068 and 1069 in Worcester, England

- Worcester, Worcestershire, England
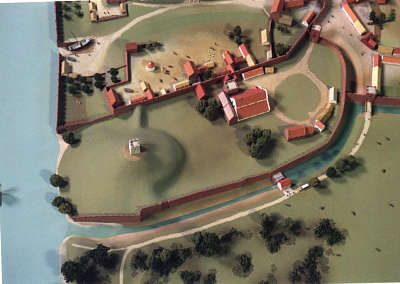
- Reconstruction of Worcester Castle as it was in 1250 AD (Note: Reconstruction by Worcester City Museums.)

Site information
- Type: Motte and bailey
- Condition: Demolished

Location
- Shown within Worcestershire
- Location within Worcestershire
- Coordinates: 52.1867°N 2.2223°W
- Grid reference: grid reference SO849543

Worcester Castle was a Norman fortification built between 1068 and 1069 in Worcester, England by Urse d'Abetot on behalf of William the Conqueror. The castle had a motte-and-bailey design and was located on the south side of the old Anglo-Saxon city, cutting into the grounds of Worcester Cathedral. Royal castles were owned by the king and maintained on his behalf by an appointed constable. At Worcester that role was passed down through the local Beauchamp family on a hereditary basis, giving them permanent control of the castle and considerable power within the city. The castle played an important part in the wars of the 12th and early 13th century, including the Anarchy and the First Barons' War.

In 1217, Henry III's government decided to break the power of the Beauchamps and reduce the ongoing military threat posed by the castle by returning much of the castle's bailey to the cathedral. Without an intact bailey the castle was no longer valuable militarily, although it played a small part in the Second Barons' War in the 1260s. A gaol had been built in the castle by the early 13th century and the castle continued to be used as Worcestershire's county gaol until the 19th century, when a new prison was built on the north side of Worcester and the old site completely redeveloped. Today nothing remains of Worcester Castle with the exception of Edgar's Tower, a cathedral gatehouse built on the former entrance to the castle.

== History ==
=== 11th century ===
Worcester Castle was built after the Norman Conquest of England in 1066, in the Anglo-Saxon city of Worcester. The castle was constructed between 1068 and 1069 on the orders of William the Conqueror as part of a wave of royal castle building in major Roman or Anglo-Saxon towns across England. Constructed in timber, the castle had a motte-and-bailey design, with a bailey to the north and south of the motte. The top of the motte was later recorded as being around 18 feet (5.5 m) in diameter. The castle was defensively well situated on the eastern bank of the River Severn in the south-west corner of the borough, taking advantage of the old burh walls and ditches. Urse d'Abetot was appointed as the sheriff of Worcester and the constable of the new castle.

Worcester was an urban castle, built within an existing settlement. Many such castles required the clearance of local properties, but unusually at Worcester Castle the ditch of the outer bailey cut through part of Worcester Cathedral's cemetery. It is unclear whether the cemetery was still in use at that time, but the desecration resulted in Ealdred, the Archbishop of York, with extensive interests in Worcester, complaining about the seizure of the land and formally cursing Urse.

=== 12th–13th centuries ===
Plan of the castle before 1217. A – Water gate; B – motte; C – ditch; D – bailey; E – Frog Mill; F – gatehouse; G – city wall

Worcester remained a royal castle, but within a few years the post of sheriff and that of constable became hereditary in the Beauchamp family, the successors to Urse d'Abetot. Urse's son, Roger, inherited them, followed by Walter de Beauchamp, who married Urse's daughter, and William de Beauchamp. The castle was effectively run by the Beauchamps, largely independent of the king. Despite controlling Worcester, the Beauchamps preferred to use Elmley Castle, 12 miles (20 k) away, as their main residence. In 1113 Worcester was attacked by Welsh raiders, who broke into the outer bailey of the castle and set fire to the buildings there; the timber castle was destroyed and had to be rebuilt, again in wood.

In the late 1130s a period of civil war – the Anarchy – broke out in England, in which the rival factions of King Stephen and the Empress Matilda contested the kingdom; Worcestershire proved to be a key battleground in the war. The first attack on Worcester itself occurred in late 1139, when an Angevin army from Gloucestershire assaulted the city; after an attempt to take the castle on the south side of the city, the Gloucester forces entered from the north, looting and burning the city. As a result, Walter de Beauchamp chose to side with Matilda. Worcester became a base for Stephen's forces for a period, with Stephen replacing Walter as the constable with Waleron de Beaumont, before the city and castle were reclaimed for the Empress by Robert of Gloucester. In response, Stephen first stormed and burnt the city in 1148, and then attacked it again in 1150, shortly before the end of the conflict. Two neighbouring siege castles were built by Stephen as part of these operations, designed to contain Worcester Castle itself, one at Henwick Hill the other at Red Hill. After the conflict, Walter was finally reaffirmed as the constable of Worcester Castle by Henry II, the Empress's son. Contemporary chronicler Henry of Huntingdon wrote that "the king's besieging castles were demolished by the craft of the earl of Leicester and the siege was raised by cunning".

By the end of the 13th century, William de Beauchamp – the grandson of Walter de Beauchamp – controlled the castle on behalf of the king. In the 12th century there was a trend in England for stone castles to replace their earth and timber counterparts, and in 1204 King John ordered the sheriff of Worcester to rebuild the gatehouse "which is now of timber, with good and fine stone". John's work cost £25, and was one of a number of repairs and improvements during the period: £12 was spent maintaining the castle in 1183, for example, while in 1192 £5 4s was spent on the internal buildings and in 1203 work on the stables came to £6 3s. (Note: It is impossible to accurately compare 12th and 13th century prices with modern equivalents. For comparison, £25 represents around a quarter of the average annual income for a late 12th century baron.)

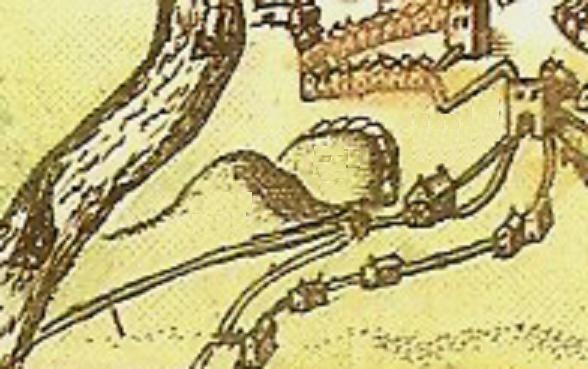
John Speed's depiction of the castle motte (l) and bailey (r) in 1610

Civil war broke out again in England in 1215 between forces loyal to King John and rebel barons, supported in due course by Prince Louis of France. John annexed the castle in 1214 and William sided with the rebels in 1216. King John responded by sending forces to attack the castle and successfully retook it. Despite John's death, the war continued until forces loyal to John's young son, Henry III, finally achieved victory over the rebels in 1217.

Meanwhile, the 11th century dispute over the cathedral graveyard had continued unabated and in 1217 Henry III's government decided to announce that the disputed land would be granted to the cathedral. A panel met to agree exactly how the land should be divided, concluding that the division should run straight across the bailey; the far side was returned to the cathedral, making the remainder of the castle unusable from a military perspective. Henry thus ingratiated himself with the church and broke the power of the Beauchamps in the city by crippling their local fortress.

The castle nevertheless continued in use for a time, partially because the Worcestershire County gaol was situated in the outer bailey; the earliest record of this gaol is from 1221, when a porter was recorded as being employed as a gaoler. The gaol appears to have been built of wood during the medieval period. Escapees remained a problem; some were recorded during the 1220s, and during Second Barons' War, Worcester was captured and all the prisoners released. Later in the same war, Henry III was imprisoned there for a period by Simon de Montfort. The castle was also used as one of the locations for the Worcestershire county court and election of local officials.

=== 14th–19th centuries ===
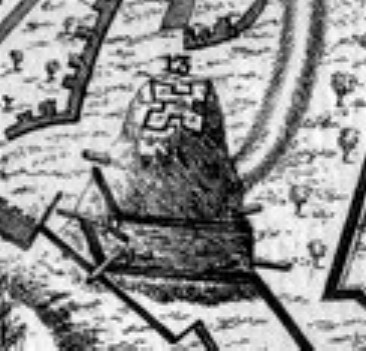
Worcester Castle in 1651, with a sconce built on top of the motte

The sheriffs of Worcestershire continued to control the castle as constables, and the property passed along hereditary lines from the Beauchamps to the Earls of Warwick until Richard Neville, also known as the "Kingmaker", died during the Wars of the Roses in 1471. The victorious Edward IV divided up the various estates that Neville had owned and gave the castle to his son, severing the link between Worcester and the earldom of Warwick. The final constables were appointed during the 1540s, after which the practice of appointing constables ceased altogether. The castle's walls were quarried for stone, the motte was used to keep animals on and only the sheriff's county gaol remained intact. The antiquarian John Leland recorded in the 1540s that the castle was "now clean down", and that the motte was still of an impressive size but heavily overgrown. A gatehouse known as Edgar's Tower was built by the cathedral on the site of the earlier castle gatehouse, to control access to the former bailey.

Robert Morgan, deputy keeper of the gaol, was paid £28 for keeping prisoners captured after the Gunpowder Plot in 1605. These included Thomas Habington, a Catholic recusant landowner who sheltered priests at Hindlip Hall. In 1628 the castle site was granted by the Crown to Giles Clutterbuck; the local gentry complained, leading to a legal case in which the county successfully reclaimed the site. In 1642 England descended into a period of civil war between the Royalist supporters of Charles I and the supporters of Parliament. Worcester's city walls were refortified and a sconce, or small fort, was built on top of the motte of Worcester Castle.

The castle continued to be used as the county gaol after the war and in 1653 a new gaol, built from stone and brick, was constructed in the castle grounds. In the 1770s the prison reformer John Howard inspected the gaol and was very critical of the facility. In particular he complained about the castle's underground dungeon, accessed down a flight of 26 steps; the room was circular, 18 feet (5.5 m) across, and guarded by an iron grill. Worcester conducted extensive work after the report at a cost of £3,431 (£364,000 at 2009 prices), and by 1788 the prison had 18 new cells for men and two for women, in addition to the dungeon and the sick-rooms. Nevertheless, it was housing 74 inmates at the time of Howard's inspection, with two prisoners routinely sharing each cell, sleeping together on the floor. Like other prisons of the time, Worcester Castle was run as a private enterprise, in this case by a local butcher, who was paid £150 a year (£15,400) to run the facility. The prison was known to suffer from outbreaks of gaol fever (Typhus), which claimed the life of a local doctor who visited the facility.

A new county gaol was built in 1814, at a cost of £20,000 (£1.1m) with a more modern system of radiating wings; this was constructed on the north side of Worcester where the local street was named "Castle Street" as a result. The Dean and Chapter of Worcester Cathedral acquired the old gaol in 1823. The outer bailey of the castle became known as the College Green; the College Green was accessed through Edgar's Tower. The motte was slowly demolished between 1823 and 1846.

== See also ==
- Castles in Great Britain and Ireland
- List of castles in England

== Bibliography ==
- Allen Brown, R (2004) [1954]. Allen Brown's English Castles. Woodbridge: The Boydell Press. doi:10.1017/9781846152429. ISBN 1-84383-069-8.
- Armitage, Ella S. (1912). The Early Norman Castles of the British Isles. London: J. Murray. OCLC 458514584.
- Baker, Nigel; Holt, Richard (2004). Urban Growth and the Medieval Church: Gloucester and Worcester. Aldershot, UK: Ashgate. ISBN 978-0-7546-0266-8.
- Bates, David (2001). William the Conqueror. Stroud, UK: Tempus. ISBN 0-7524-1980-3.
- Bradbury, Jim (2009). Stephen and Matilda: the Civil War of 1139–52. Stroud, UK: The History Press. ISBN 978-0-7509-3793-1.
- The Committee of the Society for the Improvement of Prison Discipline (1968). Remarks on the Form and Construction of Prisons: With Appropriate Designs. London: The Committee of the Society for the Improvement of Prison Discipline. OCLC 17495359.
- Creighton, O. H. (2005). Castles and Landscapes: Power, Community and Fortification in Medieval England. London: Equinox. ISBN 978-1-904768-67-8.
- Howard, John (1791). An Account of the Principal Lazarettos in Europe. London: J. Johnson, C. Dilly and T. Cadell. OCLC 228753544.
- Henry of Huntingdon (2019) [1996]. Greenway, Diana (ed.). Historia Anglorum: The History of the English People: The History of the English People. Oxford Medieval Texts. Translated by Greenway, Diana (online ed.). Oxford: Oxford University Press. doi:10.1093/actrade/9780198222248.book.1. ISBN 978-0-19-822224-8.
- Mackenzie, James D. (1896). The Castles of England: Their Story and Structure, Vol II. New York: Macmillan. OCLC 504892038.
- Pounds, N. J. G. (1994). The Medieval Castle in England and Wales: A Social and Political History. Cambridge: Cambridge University Press. ISBN 978-0-521-45099-7.
- Pugh, Ralph (1968). Imprisonment in Medieval England. Cambridge: Cambridge University Press. ISBN 978-0-521-08904-3.
