= Guy de Beauchamp, 10th Earl of Warwick =

Mediaeval English noble (c. 1272–1315)

Guy de Beauchamp
- Earl of Warwick
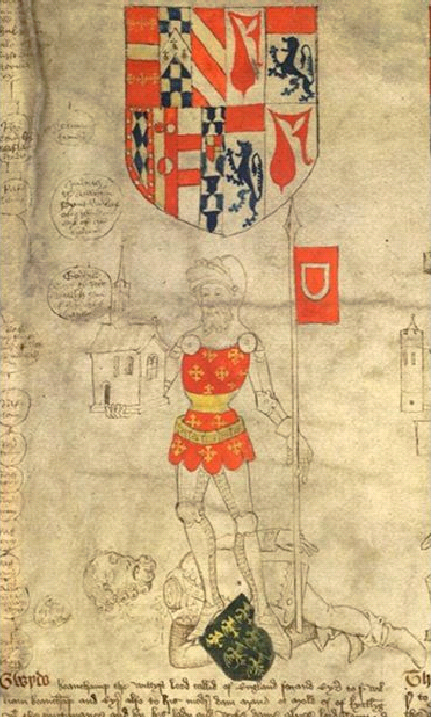
- Guy de Beauchamp standing over the decapitated body of Piers Gaveston. From the 15th-century Rous Rolls
- Born: c. 1272
- Died: 12 August 1315
- Buried: Bordesley Abbey, Worcestershire
- Spouse: Isabel de Clare ?; Alice de Toeni
- Issue See details: Maud de Beauchamp; Thomas de Beauchamp, 11th Earl of Warwick; John de Beauchamp, 1st Baron Beauchamp; Elizabeth de Beauchamp
- Father: William de Beauchamp, 9th Earl of Warwick
- Mother: Maud FitzJohn

Arms of Beauchamp: Gules, a fesse between six cross crosslets or

Guy de Beauchamp, 10th Earl of Warwick (c. 1272 – 12 August 1315), was an English magnate, and one of the principal opponents of King Edward II and his favourite, Piers Gaveston. Guy was the son of William de Beauchamp, the first Beauchamp earl of Warwick, and succeeded his father in 1298. He distinguished himself at the Battle of Falkirk and subsequently, as a capable servant of the crown under King Edward I. After the succession of Edward II in 1307, however, he soon fell out with the new king and the king's favourite, Piers Gaveston. Warwick was one of the main architects behind the Ordinances of 1311, that limited the powers of the king and banished Gaveston into exile.

When Gaveston returned to England in 1312—contrary to the rulings of the Ordinances—he was taken into custody by Aymer de Valence, 2nd Earl of Pembroke. Warwick abducted Gaveston and, together with Thomas, 2nd Earl of Lancaster, had him executed. The act garnered sympathy and support for the king, but Warwick and Lancaster nevertheless managed to negotiate a royal pardon for their actions. After the disastrous defeat at the Battle of Bannockburn in 1314, King Edward's authority was once more weakened, and the rebellious barons took over control of government. For Warwick the triumph was brief; he died the next year.

Guy de Beauchamp is today remembered primarily for his part in the killing of Gaveston, but by his contemporaries he was considered a man of exceptionally good judgement and learning. He owned what was for his time a large collection of books, and his advice was often sought by many of the other earls. Next to Lancaster, he was the wealthiest peer in the nation, and after his death his lands and title were inherited by his son, Thomas de Beauchamp, 11th Earl of Warwick.

== Family background ==
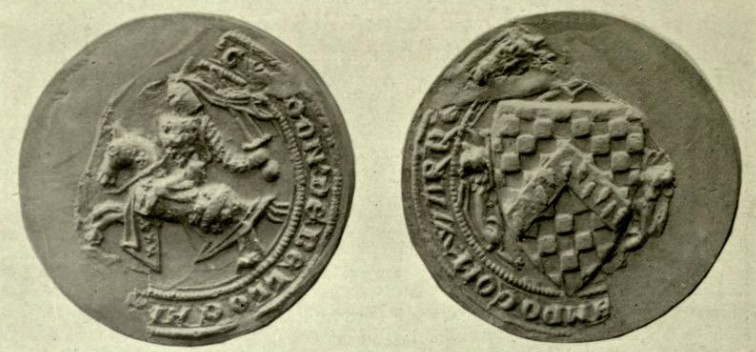
Seal of Guy de Beauchamp, 10th Earl of Warwick, as appended to the Barons' Letter, 1301. The arms shown are those of Newburgh, the family of his predecessors the Beaumont Earls of Warwick. The Beauchamps frequently quartered their own arms with those of Newburgh, on occasion placing the latter in the 1st & 4th quarters, positions of greatest honour.

Arms of Newburgh Earls of Warwick, adopted c. 1200 at start of age of heraldry: Checky azure and or a chevron ermine

Guy de Beauchamp was the first son and heir of William de Beauchamp, 9th Earl of Warwick (c. 1238 – 1298). His mother was Maud FitzJohn, daughter of John Fitzgeoffrey, who was Justiciar of Ireland and a member of the council of fifteen that imposed the Provisions of Oxford on King Henry III. William was the nephew of William Maudit, 8th Earl of Warwick, and when his uncle died without issue in 1268, he became the first Beauchamp earl of Warwick. In 1271 or 1272 his first son was born, and in reference to the new family title, William named his son after the legendary hero Guy of Warwick. William de Beauchamp was a capable military commander, who played an important part in the Welsh and Scottish wars of King Edward I.

A marriage between Guy and Isabel de Clare, daughter of Gilbert de Clare, 6th Earl of Hertford, was contemplated, or possibly even took place and then annulled. It was not until early 1309 that Guy married Alice de Toeni, a wealthy Hertfordshire heiress. By this time Guy had already succeeded as Earl of Warwick, after his father's death in 1298.

By his wife, Alice, Guy had two daughters and two sons—Thomas, his heir and successor, and John de Beauchamp, Lord Beauchamp KG (1315 – 2 December 1360), who carried the royal standard at the Battle of Crécy.

- Maud de Beauchamp (died 1366), married before Easter term 1332 Geoffrey de Say, 2nd Lord Say, by whom she had issue. The Barons Saye and Sele are their descendants.
- Elizabeth de Beauchamp (c. 1316 – 1359), married before Easter term 1332 Thomas Astley, 3rd Lord Astley, by whom she had two sons, William Astley, 4th Lord Astley, and Sir Thomas Astley, ancestor of the Astleys of Patshull and of Everley.

By an unknown mistress (or mistresses), Earl Guy also had three daughters:

- Isabel de Beauchamp; married John de Clinton.
- Emma de Beauchamp; married Roland de Oddingseles.
- Lucia de Beauchamp (also known as Lucy); married Robert de Napton, Knt., the son of Sir Adam Napton. Lucia and Sir Robert had a son Adam Napton, who married Margaret Helier.

== Service to Edward I ==
Edward I knighted Guy de Beauchamp at Easter 1296. Warwick's career of public service started with the Falkirk campaign in 1298. Here he distinguished himself, and received a reward of Scottish lands worth 1,000 marks a year. At this point his father was already dead, but it was not until 5 September that Guy did homage to the king for his lands, and became Earl of Warwick and hereditary High Sheriff of Worcestershire for life. He continued in the king's service in Scotland and elsewhere. In 1299 he helped negotiate the Treaty of Montreuil betrothing Prince Edward of Caernarfon to the French princess Isabella and he was also present at the king's own wedding to Margaret of France at Canterbury, and in 1300 he took part in the Siege of Caerlaverock Castle. The next year he was a signatory to a letter to the Pope, rejecting Rome's authority over the Scottish question, and also participated in negotiations with the French over the release of the Scottish king John Balliol. He was present at the Siege of Stirling in 1304, serving under Edward, the Prince of Wales. In March 1307 he made preparations to accompany Prince Edward to France, but this journey never took place.

Early in 1307, Edward I made his last grant to Warwick, when he gave him John Balliol's forfeited lordship of Barnard Castle in County Durham. On 7 July that year, near Burgh by Sands in Cumberland, Warwick was present when King Edward died. Together with Thomas, Earl of Lancaster, and Henry de Lacy, Earl of Lincoln, he carried the ceremonial swords at the coronation of King Edward II on 25 February 1308.

== Conflict with Edward II ==
Before his death, the old king had exiled Prince Edward's favourite Piers Gaveston, and Warwick was among those charged with preventing Gaveston's return. The new king, however, not only recalled his favourite, but soon also gave him the title of earl of Cornwall. Warwick was the only one of the leading earls who did not seal the charter, and from the start took on an antagonistic attitude to Edward II. Gaveston was a relative upstart in the English aristocracy, and made himself unpopular among the established nobility by his arrogance and his undue influence on the king. He gave mocking nicknames to the leading men of the realm, and called Warwick the "Black Dog of Arden".

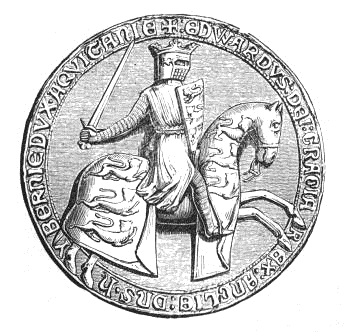
Warwick was in constant opposition to King Edward II. Great seal of Edward II.

Gaveston was once more forced into exile, but Edward recalled him in less than a year. The king had spent the intervening time gathering support, and at the time, the only one to resist the return of Gaveston was Warwick. With time, however, opposition to the king grew. Another source of contention was Edward abandoning his father's Scottish campaigns, a policy that opened the Border region up to devastating raids from the Scots. This affected Warwick greatly, with his extensive landed interest in the north. Tensions grew to the point where the king in 1310 had to ban Warwick and others from arriving at parliament in arms. They still did, and at the parliament of March 1310, the king was forced to accept the appointment of a commission to draft a set of ordinances towards reform of the royal government.

The leaders of these so-called Lords Ordainers were Robert Winchelsey, Archbishop of Canterbury, on the side of the clergy, and Warwick, Lincoln and Lancaster among the earls. Henry de Lacy, Earl of Lincoln, was the most experienced of the earls, and took on a modifying role in the group. Thomas of Lancaster, who was Lincoln's son-in-law and heir, was the king's cousin and the wealthiest nobleman in the realm, but at this point he took a less active part in the reform movement. Warwick is described by some sources as the leader of the Ordainers; he was certainly the most aggressive. The set of Ordinances they drafted put heavy restrictions on the king's financial freedom, and his right to appoint his own ministers. It also—once more—ordered Gaveston to be exiled, to return only at the risk of excommunication.

== Gaveston's death ==
Gaveston's third and final exile was of even shorter duration, and after two months, he was reunited with King Edward II in England. Archbishop Winchelsey responded by excommunicating Gaveston, as the Ordinances had stipulated. Lancaster, who had by this time succeeded his father-in-law Lincoln, had taken over leadership of the baronial opposition. While the King departed for York, a number of the barons set out in pursuit of Gaveston. Gaveston ensconced himself at Scarborough Castle, and on 19 May 1312, agreed on a surrender to Aymer de Valence, Earl of Pembroke, as long as his security would be guaranteed.

Pembroke lodged his prisoner in Deddington in Oxfordshire. On 10 June, while Pembroke was away, Warwick forcibly carried away Gaveston to Warwick Castle. Here, in the presence of Warwick, Lancaster and other magnates, Gaveston was sentenced to death at an improvised court. On 19 June he was taken to a place called Blacklow Hill—on Lancaster's lands—and decapitated. According to the Annales Londonienses chronicle, four shoemakers brought the corpse back to Warwick, but he refused to accept it, and ordered them to take it back to where they found it. Gaveston's body was eventually taken to Oxford by some Dominican friars, and in 1315, King Edward finally had it buried at Kings Langley.

The brutality and questionable legality of the earls' actions helped win political sympathy for the king. Pembroke was particularly offended, as he had been made to break his promise of safety to Gaveston, and his chivalric honour had been damaged. From this point on Pembroke sided firmly with King Edward in the political conflict. The king himself swore vengeance on his enemies, but found himself unable to move against them immediately, partly because they were in possession of a number of highly valuable royal jewels taken from Gaveston. A settlement was reached in October, whereby the rebellious barons and their retainers received a pardon. The king nevertheless emerged strengthened from the events, while Warwick and Lancaster were largely marginalised. This all changed in 1314, when the king decided to stage his first major campaign against the Scots. Warwick and Lancaster refused to participate and the campaign ended in a humiliating English defeat at the Battle of Bannockburn on 24 June. This led to another political reversal and Edward was forced to reconfirm the Ordinances, and submit to the leadership of the rebellious barons.

== Death and historical assessment ==
The coat of arms of the Beauchamp family

In mid-July Warwick had to withdraw from government to his estates on account of illness. When he died on 12 August 1315, political leadership was soon left almost entirely to Lancaster. The chronicler Thomas Walsingham reported rumours that the king had had Warwick poisoned. He was buried at Bordesley Abbey in Worcestershire, an establishment to which his family had been benefactors. In value, his possessions were second only to those of the earl of Lancaster among the nobility of England. His lands, though primarily centred on Warwickshire and Worcestershire, were spread over nineteen counties as well as Scotland and the Welsh Marches. His heir was his eldest son, whom he had named Thomas after the earl of Lancaster. Thomas, born probably on 14 February 1314, did not succeed to his father's title until 1326, as Thomas de Beauchamp, 11th Earl of Warwick. In the meanwhile Warwick's possessions went into the hands of the king, who donated Warwick's hunting dogs to the earl of Pembroke. A younger son, named John, also became a peer, as John de Beauchamp, 1st Baron Beauchamp. Like his elder brother, he distinguished himself in the French wars, and was a founding member of the Order of the Garter.

Guy de Beauchamp is probably best remembered for his opposition to King Edward II, and for his part in the death of Gaveston. To contemporaries, however, he was considered a man of considerable learning and wisdom. His library, of which he donated 42 books to Bordesley Abbey during his lifetime, was extensive. It contained several saints' lives as well as romances about Alexander and King Arthur. As mentioned, Edward I entrusted the supervision of his son to Warwick. Likewise, when the earl of Lincoln died in 1311, he supposedly instructed his son-in-law Thomas of Lancaster to heed the advice of Warwick, "the wisest of the peers". Chronicles also praised Warwick's wisdom; the Vita Edwardi Secundi says that "Other earls did many things only after taking his opinion: in wisdom and council he had no peer". Later historians have reflected this view; in the 19th century, William Stubbs called Warwick "a discriminating and highly literate man, the wisdom of whom shone forth through the whole kingdom". He was politically and economically well connected by traditional ties of kinship and marriage.

Warwick's death came at an inconvenient time and Thomas of Lancaster proved unequal to the task of governing the nation, so that further years of conflict and instability followed. Nevertheless, the problems of Edward II's reign were deep, and in the words of Michael Hicks: "one must doubt whether even Warwick could have brought unity as one chronicler supposed".

Peerage of England
Preceded by William de Beauchamp	Earl of Warwick; 1298–1315	Succeeded by Thomas de Beauchamp
