= William de Beauchamp, 9th Earl of Warwick =

English nobleman and soldier

William de Beauchamp
- 9th Earl of Warwick
- Arms of Beauchamp: Gules, a fesse between six cross crosslets or
- Predecessor: William Mauduit, 8th Earl of Warwick
- Successor: Guy de Beauchamp, 10th Earl of Warwick
- Born: c. 1238
- Died: 1298
- Spouse: Maud FitzJohn, Countess of Warwick
- Issue: Guy de Beauchamp, 10th Earl of Warwick; Isabella de Beauchamp
- Father: William (III) de Beauchamp
- Mother: Isabel de Mauduit

William de Beauchamp, 9th Earl of Warwick (c. 1238 – 1298) was the eldest of eight children of William de Beauchamp of Elmley and his wife Isabel de Mauduit. He was an English nobleman and soldier, described as a "vigorous and innovative military commander." He was active in the field against the Welsh for many years, and at the end of his life campaigned against the Scots.

== Career ==
He became hereditary High Sheriff of Worcestershire for life on the death of his father in 1268. He was a close friend of Edward I of England, and was an important leader in Edward's invasion of Wales in 1277.

In 1294, he raised the siege of Conwy Castle, where the King had been penned in, crossing the estuary.

He was victorious on 5 March 1295 at the battle of Maes Moydog against the rebel prince of Wales, Madog ap Llywelyn. In a night attack on the Welsh infantry, he used cavalry to drive them into compact formations, which were then shot up by his archers and charged.

== Family ==
His father was William (III) de Beauchamp of Elmley Castle, Worcestershire, and his mother was Isabel de Mauduit, sister and heiress of William Mauduit, 8th Earl of Warwick, from whom he inherited his title in 1268.

He had two sisters, Sarah, who married Richard Talbot, and had son Gilbert Talbot, 1st Baron Talbot, and Alicia who married Bernard I de Brus, and one brother, Walter de Beauchamp of Powyke & Alcester, (d. 1303) who married both Alice de Bohun and Alice de Toeni.

He married Maud FitzJohn. Their children included:

- Isabella de Beauchamp, who married firstly Sir Patrick de Chaworth and, secondly, Hugh le Despenser, 1st Earl of Winchester
- Guy de Beauchamp, 10th Earl of Warwick (c.1272-1315), who married Alice de Toeni, widow of Thomas de Leybourne and sister and heiress of Robert de Toeni/Tosny (d.1309), feudal baron of Flamstead in Hertfordshire.

== Ancestry ==
Ancestors of William de Beauchamp, 9th Earl of Warwick

16. Walter de Beauchamp
8. William II de Beauchamp
17. Emeline?
4. Walter de Beauchamp (justice)
2. William III de Beauchamp
20. Hugh de Mortimer
10. Roger de Mortimer of Wigmore
21. Maud le Meschin
5. Johanna de Mortimer
22. Walchelin de Ferriers
11. Isabel de Ferrers
23. Goda de Toeni
1. William de Beauchamp, 9th Earl of Warwick
24. William Mauduit
12. Robert Mauduit
25. Isabel de Senlis
6. William Mauduit, Baron Mauduit
13. Isabel Basset
3. Isabel de Mauduit
28. Roger de Beaumont, 2nd Earl of Warwick
14. Waleran de Beaumont, 4th Earl of Warwick
29. Gundred de Warenne
7. Alice de Beaumont
30. Robert de Harcourt
15. Alice de Harcourt
31. Isabel de Camville

Peerage of England
Preceded by William Mauduit	Earl of Warwick; 1268–1298	Succeeded by Guy de Beauchamp
