= William (III) de Beauchamp =

English Baron

Arms of Beauchamp: Gules, a fesse between six cross crosslets or

William III de Beauchamp (c. 1215 – 1269) of Elmley Castle in Worcestershire, was an English Baron and hereditary Sheriff of Worcestershire.

== Origins ==
He was the son and heir of Walter II de Beauchamp (1192/3-1236) of Elmley Castle, hereditary Sheriff of Worcestershire, by his wife Johanna Mortimer (d.1225), daughter of Roger Mortimer (d. 1214) of Wigmore Castle in Herefordshire.

== Career ==
On the death of his father in 1236 he became hereditary Sheriff of Worcestershire, which title he held until his death. In 1249 he was excommunicated by Walter de Cantilupe, Bishop of Worcester, but was later absolved, in the presence of the king, on St. Edmund's Day, 1251. The position included military duties as well as tax collection. He was ordered to destroy bridges in Worcestershire during the 1264 Baronial wars.

The Beauchamps used the hereditary position of Sheriff to extract money from residents and the church to an exceptional degree, while failing to pay taxes collected to the Crown. The farm of Feckenham Forest was unpaid for 12 years to 1242, and unpaid sums from his father's time also remained unpaid. He used powers of assize to harass free tenants in the Doddingtree hundred, who agreed to pay a large annual fine to stop this activity. An inquest in 1274-5 found that he had "appropriated" Doddingtree and Halfshire hundreds, which had been achieved by using his officials to harass the residents. He ran a long dispute with the Bishop Walter de Cantilupe, resulting in the Pope backing William's excommunication for abusing church rights over the liberty of Oswaldslaw, which in turn pushed Henry III to support de Beauchamp over the church. The excommunication was lifted in 1251 by the bishop. A settlement allowed the church to retain its rights, in return for a payment for the income that would be lost to the Crown, but poor wording of the agreement allowed de Beauchamp to continue the dispute until 1258.

By the end of his life, de Beauchamp had agreed to pay the Crown £10 a year to clear the debts from unpaid revenues and farms. However, these payments proved insufficient and continued to be paid by his son after his death. Historian Emma Mason regards it as remarkable that the de Beauchamp family's abuses were tolerated by the Crown, and that the hereditary nature of Worcestershire's Sherriffs was not abolished as it had been elsewhere.

== Marriage and children ==
He married Isabel de Mauduit, daughter of William de Mauduit of Hanslope in Buckinghamshire and Hartley Mauditt, Hampshire (by his wife Alice de Beaumont (d. pre- 1263), half-sister of Henry de Beaumont, 5th Earl of Warwick (c.1192-1229)) and sister and heiress of William Mauduit, 8th Earl of Warwick. By Isabel he had issue including:

- William de Beauchamp, 9th Earl of Warwick (c.1238-1298), eldest son and heir;
- Walter de Beauchamp (d.1303/6), of Powick and of Beauchamp's Court, Alcester in Warwickshire, Steward of the Household to King Edward I. His descendant was John Beauchamp, 1st Baron Beauchamp (d. 1475) "of Powick" in Worcestershire.
- Alicia de Beauchamp, married Bernard I de Bruce of Connington, had issue.
- Sarah de Beauchamp, married Richard Talbot they had issue including Gilbert Talbot, 1st Baron Talbot
- Joan de Beauchamp married Sir Bartholomew de Sudeley father of John de Sudeley, 1st Baron Sudeley.

== Sources ==
- Mason, Emma, ed. (1980). The Beauchamp Cartulary Charters 1100-1268. New Series. Vol. XLII. London: Roll Society.
