= Maud FitzJohn, Countess of Warwick =

English countess (c. 1238-1301)

Maud FitzJohn
- Lady Hallamshire; Countess of Warwick
- Born: c. 1238; Shere, Surrey, England
- Died: 16/18 April 1301
- Noble family: FitzGeoffrey
- Spouses: Gerald de Furnivalle, Lord Hallamshire; William de Beauchamp, 9th Earl of Warwick
- Issue: Guy de Beauchamp, 10th Earl of Warwick; Isabella de Beauchamp
- Father: John FitzGeoffrey, Lord of Shere
- Mother: Isabel Bigod

Maud FitzJohn, Countess of Warwick (c. 1238 – 16/18 April 1301) was an English noblewoman and the eldest daughter of John FitzGeoffrey, Lord of Shere. Her second husband was William de Beauchamp, 9th Earl of Warwick, a celebrated soldier. Through her daughter, Isabella de Beauchamp, Maud was the maternal grandmother of Hugh the younger Despenser, the unpopular favourite of King Edward II of England, who was executed in 1326.

== Family ==
Maud was born in Shere, Surrey, England in about 1238, the eldest daughter of John FitzGeoffrey, Lord of Shere, Justiciar of Ireland, and Isabel le Bigod, a descendant of Richard de Clare, 2nd Earl of Pembroke, also known by his nickname Strongbow, and Aoife of Leinster. Maud had two brothers, John FitzJohn and Richard FitzJohn and three younger sisters, Aveline FitzJohn, Joan FitzJohn, and Isabel FitzJohn. She also had a half-brother, Walter de Lacy, and two half-sisters, Margery de Lacy, and Maud de Lacy, Baroness Geneville, from her mother's first marriage to Gilbert de Lacy of Ewyas Lacy.

The chronicle of Tintern Abbey in Monmouthshire names "Matilda uxor Guidono comitis Warwici as the eldest daughter of Johanni Fitz-Geffrey and Isabella Bygod." Her paternal grandparents were Geoffrey Fitzpeter, 1st Earl of Essex and Aveline de Clare, and her maternal grandparents were Hugh Bigod, 3rd Earl of Norfolk and Maud Marshal.

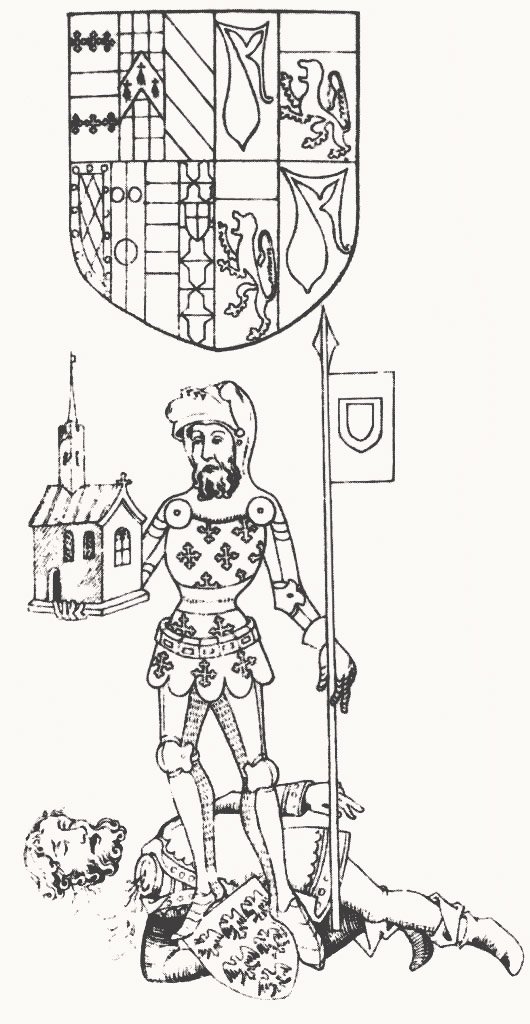
Guy de Beauchamp, 10th Earl of Warwick, the only son of Maud FitzJohn. Here he is shown with the decapitated body of Piers Gaveston

== Marriages and issue ==
Maud married her first husband, Gerald de Furnivall, Lord of Hallamshire on an unknown date, and had Loretta. Sometime after his death in 1261, Maud married her second husband, the celebrated soldier, William de Beauchamp, 9th Earl of Warwick. Upon their marriage, Maud was styled as Countess of Warwick.

Together William and Maud had at least two children:

- Guy de Beauchamp, 10th Earl of Warwick (1270/1271- 28 July 1315), on 28 February 1310, he married as her second husband, heiress Alice de Toeni, by whom he had seven children.
- Isabella de Beauchamp (died before 30 May 1306), married firstly in 1281 Sir Patrick de Chaworth, Lord of Kidwelly, by whom she had a daughter, Maud Chaworth; she married secondly in 1286, Hugh le Despenser, Lord Despenser by whom she had four children including Hugh Despenser the younger, the unpopular favourite of King Edward II, who was executed in 1326, shortly after his father.

Maud died between 16 and 18 April 1301. She was buried at the house of the Friars Minor in Worcester.
