= William de Beauchamp (of Elmley) =

Anglo-Norman baron and hereditary sheriff

William de Beauchamp (c. 1105–c. 1197) was an Anglo-Norman baron and hereditary sheriff.

He was born in Elmley Castle, Worcestershire, the son of Walter de Beauchamp, who had been made hereditary Sheriff of Worcestershire after the feudal barony of Salwarpe in Worcestershire had been confiscated from his uncle Roger d'Abetot. He served in this capacity from the death of his father in 1130 until his own death around 1197. He also served as sheriff for three other counties, Warwickshire (1157), Gloucestershire (1157–1163) and Herefordshire (1160–1169).

He died in 1197 and was buried in Worcester. He was succeeded by his son William, the eldest of his six children, who inherited the Worcestershire shrievalty in turn. After William's death in 1211, second son Walter inherited.
