= The Rhydd =

Country house in Worcestershire, England

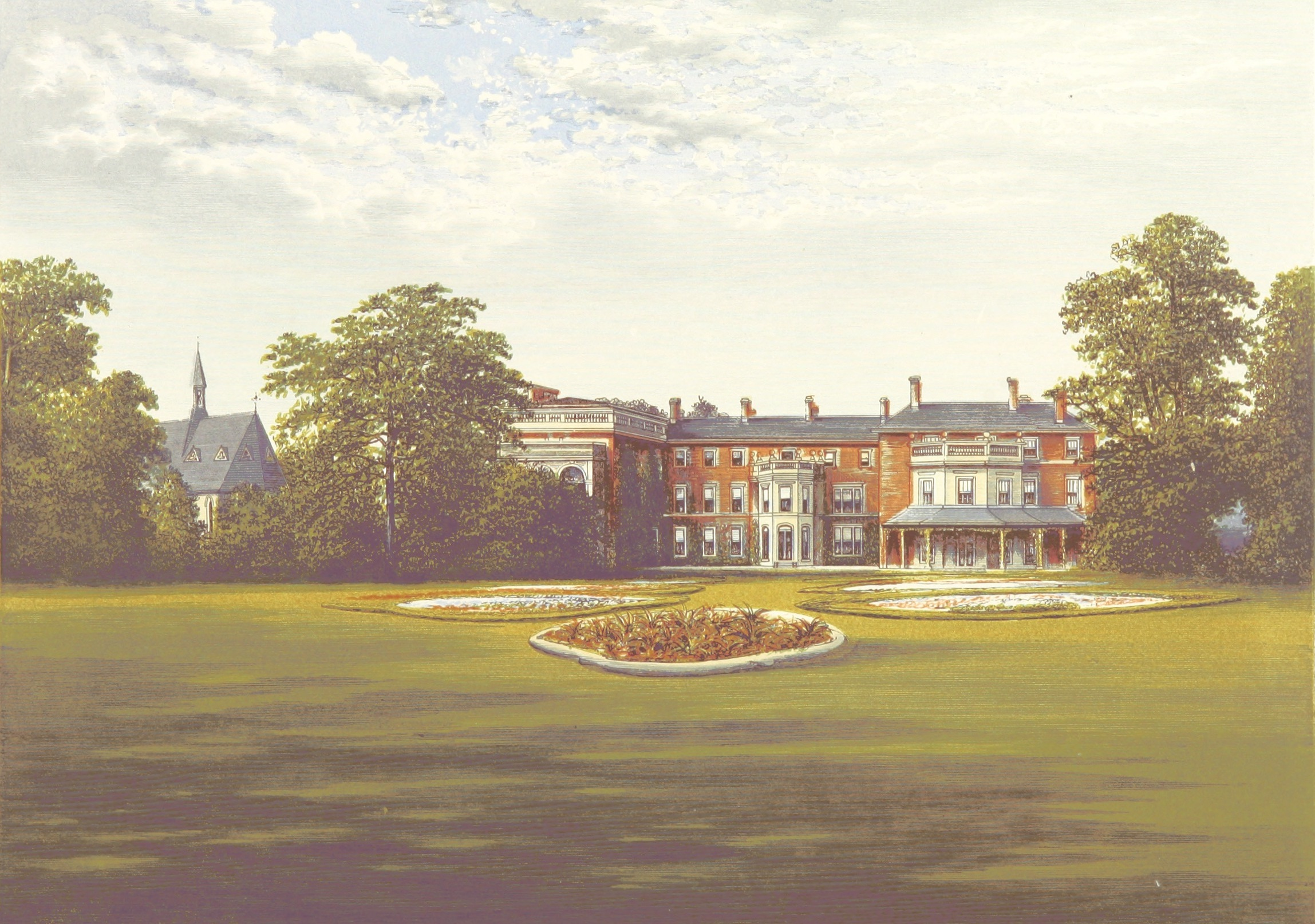
- Rhydd Court c. 1880
- Interactive map of the The Rhydd area
- Alternative names: Rhydd Court

General information
- Location: Worcester Road, Hanley Castle, Worcester WR8 0AB, England
- Coordinates: 52.1035°N 2.2396°W
- Current tenants: Options Autism
- Construction started: 1800s

Website
- www.optionsautism.co.uk/our-homes-options-malvern-view/

The Rhydd (formerly Rhydd Court) is an English country house and hamlet, alongside the River Severn, near the village of Hanley Castle, Worcestershire, about halfway between Malvern and the small town of Upton-upon-Severn. The house is now a care home.

== History ==
The name Rhydd may have come from the colour red of the earth nearby. An alternative etymology is the Welsh ‘rhyd’, meaning ford – referring to this ancient crossing point on the River Severn. The house was built about 1800 and expanded in 1863. The architects were Richard Norman Shaw, David Brandon, and Charles Francis Hansom.

William the Conqueror gave the land to the Lechmere family soon after 1066. The Lechmere family kept the land from father to son to the 19th century, and from 1805 until 1915 it was the home of Sir Anthony Lechmere, 1st Baronet, and Sir Edmund Hungerford Lechmere, 2nd Baronet.

From the 1970s to the 1990s, the complex was the campus of The Rhydd Court School, a facility for boys with behavioural and learning difficulties, run by the Malvern local government. Since 2005, the house has been a residential care home specialising in autism. Its extensive grounds, now independently owned, reach the right bank of the River Severn, and include walled gardens with a 60-foot (18 m) greenhouse; they are occasionally open to the public.

=== People ===
Isabella Anne Allen lived at The Rhydd in the 1830s. In 2022, the Royal Horticultural Society found dried plants, poetry, drawings, and notes in an old book. Research showed that these were the work of Allen, who lived at The Rhydd.
