= Alice de Toeni, Countess of Warwick =

English heiress

Alice de Toeni
- Countess of Warwick; Baroness Zouche de Mortimer
- Born: c. 1284; Flamsted, Hertfordshire, England
- Died: bef. 8 January 1325
- Noble family: Toeni [Tosny]
- Spouses: Sir Thomas Leybourne; Guy de Beauchamp, 10th Earl of Warwick; William la Zouche, 1st Baron Zouche de Mortimer
- Issue: Juliana de Leybourne; Maud de Beauchamp; Thomas de Beauchamp, 11th Earl of Warwick; John de Beauchamp; Elizabeth de Beauchamp; Alan la Zouche; Joyce la Zouche
- Father: Ralph VII de Toeni, Lord Toeni of Flamsted
- Mother: Mary

Alice de Toeni, Countess of Warwick (c. 1284 – bef. 8 January 1325) was a wealthy English heiress and the second wife of Guy de Beauchamp, 10th Earl of Warwick, an English nobleman in the reign of kings Edward I and Edward II. He was one of the principal opponents of Piers Gaveston, a favourite of Edward II. Alice married three times; Guy was her second husband.

== Family and lineage ==
Alice de Toeni (or de Tosny) was born c. 1284 in Flamsted, Hertfordshire, the only daughter of Ralph VII de Toeni, Lord Toeni of Flamsted (1255–1295) and his Scottish-born wife, Mary. Alice's paternal grandparents were Roger V de Toeni, Lord Flamsted and Alice de Bohun. The latter was a daughter of Humphrey de Bohun, 2nd Earl of Hereford and Maud de Lusignan. Alice had an older brother, Robert de Toni, 1st Baron Toni of Flamstead (4 April 1276 – 1309), who married Maud, the daughter of Malise III, Earl of Strathearn, but died childless in 1309. Upon his death, Alice became his heir. Her inheritance included manors in Essex, Worcestershire, Wiltshire, Hertfordshire, Cambridgeshire and the Welsh Marches.

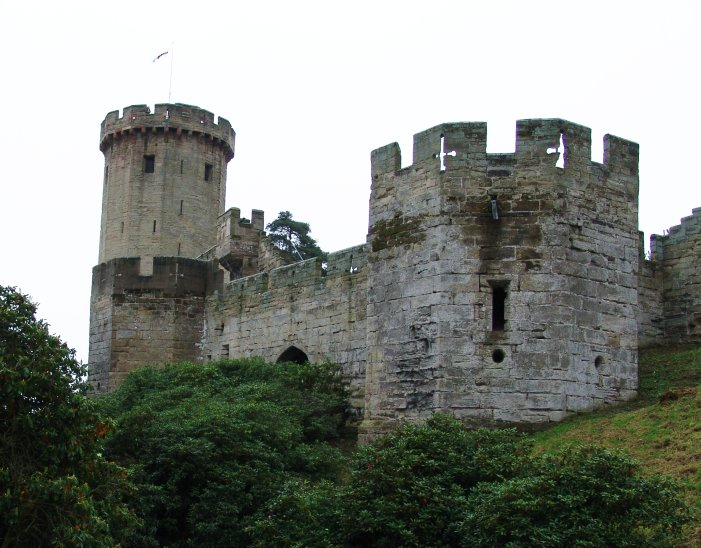
Warwick Castle, the principal residence of Guy de Beauchamp and Alice de Toeni

== Marriages and issue ==
In 1300, when Alice was sixteen, she married her first husband, Sir Thomas Leybourne (died May 1307), son of Sir William Leybourne, by whom she had one daughter:

1. Juliana de Leybourne (1303/4 – 30 October/2 November 1367), married, firstly, John, Lord Hastings, by whom she had issue; secondly, Thomas le Blount; thirdly, William Clinton.

On 28 February 1309, less than two years after the death of her first husband, Alice married secondly Guy de Beauchamp, 10th Earl of Warwick, the only son of William de Beauchamp, 9th Earl of Warwick and Maud FitzJohn.

He had been previously married to Isabel de Clare, the daughter of Gilbert de Clare, 6th Earl of Gloucester and Alice de Lusignan of Angoulême, but the marriage, which had produced no children, was annulled. Guy had already distinguished himself in the Wars of Scottish Independence and was one of the Ordainers, who sought to restrict the powers of the king. Guy de Beauchamp was one of the chief adversaries of Piers Gaveston, King Edward's favourite, who often referred to Guy as The Mad Hound, due to the Earl's habit of foaming at the mouth when angry. In 1312, Guy de Beauchamp captured Gaveston and took him to his principal residence Warwick Castle where Gaveston was held prisoner and afterwards murdered.

Alice and Guy had two sons and two daughters:

1. Maud de Beauchamp (died 1366); she married Geoffrey de Say, 2nd Lord Say, by whom she had issue.
2. Thomas de Beauchamp, 11th Earl of Warwick (14 February 1314 – 13 November 1369), married Katherine Mortimer, by whom he had sixteen children.
3. John de Beauchamp, Lord Beauchamp KG (1315 – 2 December 1360); carried the royal standard at the Battle of Crécy.
4. Elizabeth de Beauchamp (1316—1359); she married in 1328 Thomas Astley, 3rd Lord Astley, by whom she had two sons, William Astley, 4th Lord Astley and Sir Thomas Astley, ancestor of the Astleys of Patshull and of Everley.

Following the sudden death of Guy de Beauchamp at Warwick Castle on 12 August 1315, which was rumoured to have been caused by poisoning, Alice married, thirdly, on 26 October 1316, William la Zouche, 1st Lord Zouche de Mortimer (see Baron Zouche), by whom she had a son and a daughter:

1. Alan la Zouche (bef. 15 November 1317 – 12 November 1346), 2nd Lord Zouche de Mortimer.
2. Joyce la Zouche (c. 1318/20 – 1372); she married John Botetourt, 2nd Baron Botetourt.

== Death ==
Alice de Toeni died on 1 January 1324 or 1325. The de Toeni lands and manors passed to her eldest son Thomas de Beauchamp, 11th Earl of Warwick. Her widower, Lord Zouche, later abducted and married Eleanor de Clare, widow of Hugh le Despenser, the Younger. Lord Zouche had been one of le Despenser's captors and had led the siege of Caerphilly Castle.
