= Daniel Dobbyns =

Daniel Dobbyns was High Sheriff of Worcestershire in 1641. He became a captain in the Parliamentary Army and was also a member of the Worcestershire County Committee.

He and William Hopkins were both returned for Bewdley in 1647 (a double return for a single seat) to replace the Royalist Sir Henry Herbert. The election was voided and a new election held in 1648.
