= John du Plessis, 7th Earl of Warwick =

Anglo-Norman nobleman

John du Plessis or Plessetis, Earl of Warwick (died 26 February 1263) was an Anglo-Norman nobleman in the service of King Henry III of England.

== Life ==
He was of Norman origin, and was probably a son of the Hugh de Plessis who occurs as one of the royal knights from 1222 to 1227; he was possibly a grandson of the John de Plesseto who witnessed a charter of John, King of England in 1204, and was in the royal service in 1207. Amauricius and William de Plessis, who were provided with benefices by the king's order in 1243, may have been his brothers.

Du Plessis is first mentioned in 1227, when he was one of four knights to whom £60 was given for their support. He served in Wales in 1231, and, on 2 March 1232, witnessed a royal charter to Stephen de Segrave. On 30 May 1234, he was appointed warden of Devizes Castle and of Chippenham Forest. In 1239, and 1240, he was sheriff of Oxfordshire, and, on 9 December 1241, had the wardship of the heiresses of John Biset of Combe Biset, Wiltshire.

In May 1242, du Plessis accompanied Henry III to Poitou. On 2 November, he was granted a charger worth £30, on 23 November, freedom of bequest, and, on 25 December, the marriage of Margaret de Neubourg, countess of Warwick, and widow of John Marshal, son of John Marshal (1170?-1235). He returned to England with the king in October 1243. Through the royal influence his suit with Margaret de Neubourg was successful, but he did not assume the title of Earl of Warwick until his tenure of it for life was assured by the consent of the next heir, William Mauduit, father of William Mauduit; he is first styled earl in April 1245. On 18 October 1250, he had a grant of his wife's lands for life.

On 24 June 1244, du Plessis had been appointed constable of the Tower of London; and he appears as one of the justices to hold the pleas of the city of London on 24 September 1251. In 1252 he is mentioned as one of the royal courtiers who took the cross, and in May 1253 was one of the witnesses to the excommunication of those who broke the charters.

On 3 June 1253, his wife died so her estates settled on William Maudit as 8th Warwick. In August 1253 he again went with Henry to Gascony, and was in the royal service there till August 1254. On 11 February 1254, he was employed to treat with Gaston de Bearn, and on 5 March received £200 in payment for his services. He was at Bordeaux in August 1254, but, having obtained letters of safe-conduct from Louis IX, started home through Poitou early in September, in company with Gilbert de Segrave and William Mauduit. The party was treacherously seized by the citizens of Pons in Poitou; Segrave died in captivity, and John du Plessis was not released until the following year.

In the spring of 1258 du Plessis sat with John Mansel and others at the exchequer to hear charges against the mayor of London. At the parliament of Oxford in June 1258 he was one of the royal representatives on the committee of twenty four, was one of the royal electors of the council of fifteen, and a member of the latter body. He was appointed warden of Devizes Castle by the barons, and in 1259 was one of the council selected to act when the king was out of England. On 28 November 1259, he was a commissioner of oyer and terminer for the counties of Somerset, Devon, and Dorset.

When Henry removed the baronial sheriffs in July 1261, du Plessis was given charge of Leicestershire, and on 10 August was also made warden of Devizes Castle, a post which he held till 15 June 1262. He died on 26 February 1263, and was buried at Missenden Abbey, Buckinghamshire.

== Arms ==
The coat of arms of John du Plessis was: six annulets gules (red) on a field of argent (silver).

== Family ==
John du Plessis's first wife was Christiana (died before 1242), daughter and heiress of Hugh de Sanford of Hook Norton. They had three children:

- Hugh (1237-1291), Knt. Hugh married his father's ward, Isabella, elder daughter and co-heiress of John de Biset. Their children were:
  - Hugh (1266-1301), who was summoned to Parliament in 1299, and left a son Hugh, who died before 1356 without male issue.
  - John of Quainton, who in 1270 was married to Annabel, eldest daughter of Nicholas Segrave, 1st Baron Segrave. They have numerous descendants; the direct male descendants perpetuate the du Plessis surname.
  - Christiana, who in 1270 married John Segrave (1256-1325), who subsequently succeeded his father Nicholas as 2nd Baron Segrave. They have numerous descendants, including the Mowbray and Howard Dukes of Norfolk, and Queens Elizabeth I of England and Elizabeth II.
- Robert, who married Ela, his father's other ward, and the younger daughter and co-heiress of John Bisset. They have numerous descendants; the direct male descendants perpetuate the du Plessis surname.
- Beatrice

John du Plessis's second wife had no issue, and he was succeeded as Earl of Warwick by her nephew, William Mauduit, grandson of the 4th Earl. A nephew called Hugh de Plessetis was ancestor of the family of Wroth of Wrotham, Kent.

There was a family of the name of Plessis or de Plessetis settled at Plessy in the township of Blyth, Northumberland. Alan de Plessis and John de Plessis were concerned in a forest dispute in Northumberland in 1241. The latter was a person of some note in the county, and was no doubt the warden of Northumberland in 1258, though Dugdale and others have erroneously assigned this office to the Earl of Warwick.

=== Surname ===
The surname du Plessis also had other spellings in England, including de Plescy, de Plessis, and the Latinized forms de Plessitis and de Placetis. The descendants of John du Plessis generally adopted the Latinized form but dropped the preposition, and over the centuries the surname was corrupted into various spellings, including Pleisted, Plaisted, Playsteed, Pleastid and Plestead.

== Notes ==
Peerage of England
Preceded by Margaret de Newburg and John Marshal, jure uxoris	Earl of Warwick; 1245–1253	Succeeded by William Mauduit
