= Bernard I de Brus of Connington and Exton =

13th century English noble

Arms of Bruce of Conington and Exton: Azure, a saltire and chief or.

Bernard I de Brus (died 22 November 1268), Lord of Connington and Exton was an English lord from Huntingdonshire and Rutland. He was the second son of Robert de Brus, 4th Lord of Annandale and his wife, Isabella of Huntingdon. Bernard was the younger brother of Robert de Brus, 5th Lord of Annandale, however, is sometimes incorrectly reported to be his son. A charter by Bernard's son, Sir Bernard de Brus II, dated 1283 clearly identifies Bernard II as the grandson of Isabella de Brus (Isabella of Huntingdon), wife of Robert de Brus 4th Lord of Annandale, and the son of Bernard de Brus of Exton.

In 1264, Bernard fought on the side of Simon de Montfort in the Second Barons' War, while his older brother sided with the King. Along with Gilbert de Clare, Earl of Gloucester, Bernard negotiated the terms of the ransom of his brother, Robert de Brus, 5th Lord of Annandale, who had been captured, along with Henry III of England and Lord Edward at the Battle of Lewes. Following the defeat of Monfort’s forces at the Battle of Evesham, in August 1265, Bernard was seized of his lands, however, they were later returned to him.

Bernard de Brus I is recorded as having died on 22 November, the Thursday after St Edmund's day, in 1268.

== Marriage and issue ==
Bernard de Brus married firstly Alicia de Beauchamp, daughter of William de Beauchamp of Elmley and Isabel de Mauduit, they had the following known issue.

- Sir Bernard de Brus II of Connington and Exton
- John de Brus of Thrapston

He married, secondly, about 1266 Constance de Merston, widow of John de Morteyn, and daughter of Ralph FitzJohn de Merston, Bedfordshire. Bernard and Constance are not known to have had children. Constance survived Bernard and married a third time, to Robert de Wotton.
