= Isabella Anne Allen =

English botanist and painter (1810–1865)

- Born: December 27, 1810
- Died: 1865 (aged 54–55)

Isabella Anne Allen (1810–1865) was a 19th-century botanist who lived in the village of Madresfield, Worcestershire.

== Life ==
Allen was born on December 27, 1810. She was a member of the Floral Society in Malvern and regularly attended their botanical shows. She was also a painter. Allen died in 1865.

In 2021, the Royal Horticultural Society found items within a donated book, The English Flora. They found a name, Isabella A. Allen, but no further details about the person who had collected the botanical items. After an appeal in the press, the woman was identified as Isabella Anne Allen.
