= High Sheriff of Worcestershire =

English ceremonial officer

This is a list of sheriffs and since 1998 high sheriffs of Worcestershire.

The Sheriff is the oldest secular office under the Crown. Formerly the Sheriff was the principal law enforcement officer in the county but over the centuries most of the responsibilities associated with the post have been transferred elsewhere or are now defunct, so that its functions are now largely ceremonial. Under the provisions of the Local Government Act 1972, on 1 April 1974 the office previously known as Sheriff was retitled High Sheriff.

Under the same act Herefordshire and Worcestershire were merged to form the new county of Hereford and Worcester, therefore the office of Sheriff of Worcestershire was replaced by that of High Sheriff of Hereford and Worcester. However, in 1998 the new county was dissolved, restoring Herefordshire and Worcestershire and creating the offices of High Sheriff of Herefordshire and High Sheriff of Worcestershire.

== Medieval ==
=== Early Norman ===
- 1066 Cyneweard of Laughern
- c. 1086 Robert the Bursar
- c. 1069–1108 Urse d'Abetot
- 1108–c. 1110 Roger d'Abetot (exiled 1110)
- c. 1110–1114 Osbert d'Abetot
- 1114–1130 Walter de Beauchamp
- 1130– : William de Beauchamp

=== Henry II (25 October 1154 – 6 July 1189) ===
Source: Thomas Fuller’s Worthies of England; Rev George Miller, The Parishes of the Diocese of Worcester

- William de Bello Campo (William de Beauchamp) 2–15
- William de Bello Campo, and Hugo de Puckier 16
- Randulph de Launch, 17–20
- Robert de Lucy 21
- Michael Belett of Wroxton, Oxon, 22–28
- Sir Thomas Lucy, 28
- Rad de Glanvill 29
- Michael Belet of Wroxton, Oxon, 30
- Robert Marmion 31–33
- Henry de Clugensby 34

=== Richard I 6 July 1189 – 6 April 1199 ===
Source: Thomas Fuller’s Worthies of England

- Robert Marmion 1
- William de Bello Campo 2
- William de Bello Campo and Richard de Piplinton 3–4
- William de Bello Campo 5–6
- Henry de Longo Campo 7–9
- Ralph de Grafton of Grafton Flyford 10

=== John 1199–1216 ===
Source: Thomas Fuller’s Worthies of England

- Radulph de Grafton 1–2
- William de Cantelupo and Adam de Worcester 3–5
- Robert de Cantelupo 6–7
- William de Cantelupo and Adam Cl'ieus 8
- William de Cantelupo and Walter le Puchier 9-11
- William de Cantelupo and Adam Ruffus 12
- William de Cantelupo and Adam Delwich 13–14
- William de Cantelupo and Philip Kutton 15–17.

=== Henry III 1216–1272 ===
Source: Thomas Fuller’s Worthies of England

- Walter de Bello Campo (Walter Beauchamp) and Henry Lunett 2–4
- Walter de Bello Campo and Hugh le Pohier 5–7
- Walter de Bello Campo and Thomas Wigorne 9-11
- Walter de Bello Campo 12–14
- Walter de Bello Campo and Hugh le Pohier 15
- Walter de Bello Campo and William de Malvern 16–18
- "Idem (sive Will.)" 19
- Walter de Bello Campo and William de Malvern 20
- William de Bello Campo (William Beauchamp) and William de Blandhall 21–22
- William de Bello Campo and Laurence de Wandlesworth 23–25
- William de Bello Campo and Simon de London 26
- William de Bello Campo 27–50
- William de Bello Campo and John de Hull 51–52
- William de Bello Campo 53–55

=== Edward I 1272–1307 ===
Source: Thomas Fuller’s Worthies of England

- William de Bello Campo Comes Warwick 1–26
- Guido de Bello Campo 27–35

=== Edward II 7 July 1307 – 25 January 1327 ===
Source: Thomas Fuller’s Worthies of England

- Guido de Bello Campo, Comes Warwick and Robert de Berkenhall
- Guido de Bello Campo, Comes Warwick and Walter de Perthrope 2–5
- Guido de Bello Campo, and Robert de Warwick 6–7
- Guido de Bello Campo 8
- Johan de Hernyold 9
- Walter de Bello Campo 10–11
- William Stracy 12–14
- William de Bello Campo 15–16
- Nicholas Russell 17–18
- Walter de Kokesey 19

=== Edward III 25 January 1327 – 1377 ===
Source: Thomas Fuller’s Worthies of England

- Walter de Kokesey 1–2 (1327–1328)
- Richard de Handeslowe 3–5 (1329–1331)
- Thomas de Bello Campo 6–42 (1333–1369)
- Thomas de Bello Campo43–51 (1370–1377)

=== Richard II 1377–99 ===
Source: Thomas Fuller’s Worthies of England

- Thomas de Bello Campo (Thomas Beauchamp, 12th Earl of Warwick) 1–5
- Thomas de Bello Campo 5–17
- Thomas de Bello Campo 18–19
- John Washburne 20
- Henry Haggerley 21
- 1398 Robert Russell of Dudley 22

=== Henry IV Bolingbroke 30 September 1399 – 1413 ===
Source: Thomas Fuller’s Worthies of England

- Thomas de Bello Campo 1
- 1401 (May–Nov) John Brace of Droitwich and Doverdale
- 1401 Thomas de Bello Campo and William Beauchamp of Powick 2
- 1402 Thomas Hodyngton of Huddington 3
- Richard de Bello Campo, Comes Warwick (Richard Beauchamp) 4–12

=== Henry V 20 March 1413 – 1422 ===
Source: Thomas Fuller’s Worthies of England

- Richard de Bello Campo 1–9

=== Henry VI ===
- Richard de Bello Campo 1–15
- Norman Washburne, Subvice 16
- Henry Beauchamp 18
- Thomas Lyttelton 26
- Richard Nevyle 28

=== Edward IV (first reign) 4 March 1461 – 2 October 1470 ===
- Gualterus Skull 12

- James Radclyffe 20

=== Richard III 26 June 1483 – 1485 ===
Source: Thomas Fuller’s Worthies of England

- Jacob Radcliffe 1
- William Houghton 2
- Humphrey Stafford and Richard Nanfan 3

=== Henry VII 22 August 1485 – 1509 ===
Source: Thomas Fuller’s Worthies of England

- Humphrey Stafford
- 1485 Richard Nanfan 1–2
- John Savage I 3–7
- John Savage II, arm. 8–12 (son of above John)
- John Savage II, mil. 13–24

John Savage II, mil.13-24

== Early modern ==
=== Henry VIII 21 April 1509 – 1547 ===
Source: Thomas Fuller’s Worthies of England

- John Savage, mil. 1–7
- 1516–1528 William Compton, mil 8–26
- 1528–?1535 Edward Ferrers (died 1535)
- 1535–1536 Walter Walsh 27–28
- 1538 (Mar–Nov) John Russell of Strensham 29
- 1538 Robert Acton of Elmley Lovett and Ribbesford 30
- 1539 Sir Gilbert Talbot of Grafton 31
- 1540 Sir John Pakington of Hampton Lovett 32
- 1541 John Russell of Strensham 33
- 1542 George Throgmorton of Throgmorton 34
- 1543 Thomas Hunkes of Radbroke 35
- 1544 John Talbot of Grafton 36
- 1545 Robert Acton of Elmley Lovett and Ribbesford 37
- 1546 John Russell of Strensham 38

=== Edward VI 28 January 1547 – 1553 ===
Source: Thomas Fuller’s Worthies of England

- 1547 William Sheldon of Beoley 1
- 1548 Richard Ligon 2
- 1549 William Gower 3
- 1550 William Ligon 4
- 1551 Thomas Russell of Strensham and Witley 5
- 1552 John Talbot of Grafton 6

=== Mary I 19 July 1553 – 1558 ===
Source: Thomas Fuller’s Worthies of England

- 1553 Henry Dingley of Charlton 1
- 1554 John Folliatt 2
- 1555 Thomas Baskerville of Birlingham and Wollas Hall, Eckington 3
- 1556 William Sheldon of Beoley 4
- 1557 John Littleton of Frankley 5
- 1558 John Knottesford 6

=== Elizabeth I 1558 – 1603 ===
Source: Thomas Fuller’s Worthies of England

- 1559 Thomas Russell of Strensham and Witley 1
- 1560 William Ligon 2
- 1561 Thomas Packington 3
- 1562 Galfridus Markham 4
- 1563 Thomas Baskerville of Birlingham and Wollas Hall, Eckington 5
- 1564 William Jefferyes of Holm. Caf. and William Hunkes 6
- 1565 Anthony Daston of Broadway 7
- 1566 John Littleton 8
- 1567 William Sheldon of Beoley 9
- 1568 Henry Dingley 10
- 1569 Thomas Russell of Strensham and Witley 11
- 1570 Francis Walsh 12
- 1571 John Rouse of Rous Lench 13
- 1572 John Littleton 14
- 1573 Richard Ligon 15
- 1574 Edmund Colles of Leigh 16
- 1575 Edward Harewell of Bifford 17
- 1576 Ralph Sheldon of Beoley 18
- 1577 John Russell of Strensham 19
- 1578 Henry Berkley 20
- 1579 Walter Blunt of Kidderminster 21
- 1580 Francis Walsh 22
- 1581 Thomas Folliat of Purton 23
- 1582 John Walshburne 24
- 1583 Richard Ligon 25
- 1584 Gilbert Lyttelton of Prestwood Hall 26
- 1585 Thomas Lucy of Warwick 27
- 1586 William Child of Northwick 28
- 1587 Egid. Read 29
- 1588 George Winter of Huddington 30
- 1589 William Savage 31
- 1590 Edmund Colles of Leigh 32
- 1591 Henry Bromley of Holt Castle 33
- 1592 William Lygon of Madresfield 34
- 1593 Sir Thomas Biggs of Lenchwick 35
- 1594 Sir John Pakington 36
- 1595 Thomas Folliat 37
- 1596 Sir Edward Harewell, KB 38
- 1597 Francis Dingley 39
- 1598 William Walsh of Abberley 40
- 1599 William Child 41
- 1600 John Washborn 42
- 1601 William Savage 43
- 1602 George Blunt 44
- 1603 Thomas Russell 45

=== James I 24 March 1603 – 1625 ===
Source: Thomas Fuller’s Worthies of England

- 1603 Thomas Russell of Strensham 1
- 1604 Richard Walsh 2
- 1605 William Barnaby of Acton 3
- 1606 Walter Snage 4
- 1607 Sir John Packington of Westwood Park 5
- 1608 Arnold Ligon 6
- 1609 Sir Richard Grevis of Moseley 7
- 1610 Sir John Rouse 8
- 1611 Edward Pitts of Kyre Wyard 9
- 1612 John Savage 10
- 1613 Robert Berkeley of Spetchley 11 or Thomas Lyttleton of Frankley Hall
- 1614 Sharington Talbot of Grafton 12
- 1615 Francis Moore 13
- 1616 William Jefferies 14
- 1617 William Berkeley 15
- 1618 Sir Samuel Sandys of Ombersley 16
- 1619 Walter Blount of Sodington Hall 17)
- 1620 William Kite (or Keyte) of Bishampton 18 or Sir Edmund Wylde of Kempsey (died in office 1620)
- 1621 Edr Seabright of Besford 19
- 1622 John Woodward 20
- 1623 John Culpepper of Kent
- 1624 Egid. Savage 22

=== Charles I (1625–49) ===
Source: Thomas Fuller’s Worthies of England

- 1625 Walter Devereux, 5th Viscount Hereford of Leigh Court 1
- 1626 Edward Cookes 2
- 1627 Richard Skynner 3
- 1628 Henry Bromley 4
- 1629 William Jeffreys 5
- 1630 Arthur Smithes 6
- 1631 Sir James Pitts 7
- 1632 Thomas Good 8
- 1633 John Keyte of Bishampton 9
- 1634 John Savage 10
- 1635 William Russell of Great Witley 11
- 1636 Sir John Rouse of Rous Lench 12
- 1637 Edward Dingley 13
- 1638 Thomas Greaves 14
- 1639 John Winford 15
- 1641 Daniel Dobbyns.
- 1642 William Russell of Great Witley
- 1643 Thomas Dobyns
- 1644 Sir Rowland Berkeley of Cotheridge, nr Worcester
- 1645 Henry Bromley of Holt
- 1646 Henry Ingram of Earl's Court
- 1647 William Lygon
- 1648 (Apr–Nov)Sir Thomas Rouse, Bt of Rous Lench
- 1648 Sir Henry Herbert of Ribbesford, Near Bewdley
- 1649 John Hanbury of Feckenham

== 17th century ==
- 1650: William Cooke
- 1651: William Combe
- 1652: Thomas Dannett
- 1653: John Barker
- 1654: Sir Henry Lyttelton, 2nd Baronet of Hagley Hall
- 1655: Thomas Foley.
- 1656: Thomas Turvey
- 1657: Humphrey Lowe
- 1658: George Coventry
- 1659?: William Dowdeswell
- 1660: John Winford
- 1661: Edward Pitts
- 1662: John Nanfan
- 1663: Francis Haselwood
- 1664: William Coombe of Hallow
- 1664: William Hancock of London
- 12 November 1665: Sir William Cooks, of Norgrave
- 7 November 1666: John or Thomas Turvey
- 6 November 1667: Sir Thomas Cooke
- 6 November 1668: Thomas Norris
- 11 November 1669: Thomas Symonds
- 1671: ?Richard Case of Powick
- 4 November 1670: Edward Dingley
- 9 November 1671: Robert Foley of Stourbridge
- 7 November 1672: Thomas Jolley
- 10 November 1673: Thomas Foley of Witley Court
- 5 November 1674: Humphrey Loe
- 15 November 1675: William Smith, of Worcester
- 10 November 1676: William Dowdeswell
- 15 November 1677: Richard Vernon
- 14 November 1678: James Pytts, of Kyre Park and Kinnersley Castle, Herefordshire
- 23 November 1678: Richard Nicoletts
- 13 November 1679: Robert Berkley
- 4 November 1680: Richard Nash
- 1682: Thomas Savage of Elmley
- 1683: Sir Thomas Haslewood
- 1684: Henry Jeffreys
- 1685: Richard Liggen
- 1686: Sir Thomas Cokes
- 1687: Thomas Low
- 1688: Sir Walter Kirkham Blount, Bt of Sodington Hall
- 1688: Richard Dowdeswell of Pull Court, Bushley
- 1689: William Gower replaced by Sir Edward Seabright
- 1690: Capell Hanbury
- 1690: Robert Berksley
- 1691: William Hancock
- 1692: Alan Cliffe of Witley
- 1693: Samuel Swift
- 1694: Edward Partridge
- 1695: Timothy Bridgeshire
- 1696: Higgon James replaced by William Lea
- 1696: Grosvenor Dyson
- 1697: John Appletree of Hanbury
- 1697: William Lea of Halesowen Grange
- 1698: William Vernon jnr
- 1699: Giles Parsons

== 18th century ==
- 1700: Benjamin Jolliffe
- 1701: Higgins James of Astley
- 1702: Thomas Savage
- 1703: Humphrey Soley
- 1704: Phineas Jackson of Claines
- 1705: Samuel Pytts of Kyre Park
- 1706: Thomas Batch
- 1707: Edward Palmer
- 1708: Thomas Perrott
- 1709: George Gardiner of Evesham
- 1710: John Ches(t)le of Wallhouse
- 1711: Rowland Greene Berkeley of Cotheridge Court
- 1712: John Feild
- 1713: William Norton
- 1713: ?Thomas Bache of Northfield
- 1714: Henry Townsend
- 1715: Richard Lane of Worcester
- 1716: Thomas Smith of Tenbury
- 1717: William Amphlett of Astley and later Hadzor
- 1717: George Gardiner of Evesham and Shipston-on-Stour
- 1718: William Amphlett
- 1719: John Meysey
- 1720: William Amphlett of Astley and later Hadzor
- 1721: John Wowen of St. Johns in Bedwardine
- 1722: James Compton
- 1722: Sir Thomas Cookes Winford, 2nd Baronet of Glasshampton and Norgrove
- 1723: Francis Sheldon of Abberton
- 1724: Charles Craven
- 1725: Thomas Hunt of Stourbridge
- 1726: Edmund Skinner of Wichenford
- 1727: William Dowdeswell of Pool Court, Bushley
- 1728: John Baker
- 1729: Thomas Bushell
- 1730: Richard Bourne of Acton, near Ombersley
- 1732: Isaac John Amplett
- 1733: Edmund Lechmere of Hanley Castle
- 1734: Thomas Rous of Rouslench
- 1735: George Nash of Markeley
- 1736: Edward Moore of Barnt Green
- 1737: John Mathews of Worcester
- 1738: John Perrott of Bellbroughton
- 1739: John Hart of Shipton
- 1740: Richard Roberts of Pershore
- 1741: Gilbert Wheeler
- 1742: Nicholas Bennet
- 1743: James Newnham of Winterfold
- 1744: George Nash of Martley
- 1745: John Ravenhill of Strensham
- 1746: William Amphlett of Hadzor
- 1747: Joshua Dowler
- 1748: Richard Buckle of Chaseley
- 1749: Adam Hough of Hartley and Comberton
- 1750: Humphrey Low of Bromsgrove
- 1751: George Holland of Tenbury
- 1752: Edward Cope Hopton of Canon Frome, Herefordshire
- 1753: Thomas Phillips of Stourbridge
- 1754: Francis Clare, of Clent
- 1755: Francis Highway of Drayton, Chaddesley Corbett
- 1756: Joseph Biddle of Evesham and Charlton
- 1757: Thomas Burch Savage of Elmlea Castle
- 1758: Charles Trubshaw Withers, of Samsome Fields, Worcester
- 1759: John Amphlett of Ombersley
- 1760: John Timbrill of Bretforton
- 1761: Richard Case of Powick
- 1762: Sir Samuel Hellier, Kt of Rushock
- 1763: Benjamin Johnson of Worcester
- 1764: Robert Martin of Pebworth
- 1764: Rowland Berkeley of Cotheridge, near Worcester
- 1765: Edward Winwood of Lindridge
- 1766: Thomas Cookes of Harvington
- 1767: Sir Herbert Perrott Pakington, 7th Baronet, of Westwood
- 1768: Thomas Bury, jnr of Abberley
- 1769: Edward Knight of Wolverley
- 1770: John Martin of Overbury
- 1771: Edmund Pytts of Kyre Park, near Tenbury
- 1772: Charles Watkins-Meysey of Shakenhurst
- 1773: John Tristram of Moor Hall
- 1774: John Hurtle of Sion Hill
- 1775: Samuel West of Earl's Croome
- 1776: Josiah Dineley of Peopleton
- 1777: Samuel Netherton of Hill End House, Chaseley
- 1778: Edward Whitcombe of Orleton
- 1779: John Foster of Wordsley
- 1780: Richard Amphlett of Hadsor
- 1781: John Darke of Bredon
- 1782: Joseph Berwick of Worcester
- 1783: Jonathan Pitts of Kyre Park
- 1784: Thomas Bund of Wick
- 1785: Richard Bourne Charlett of Elmley Castle
- 1786: George Perrot of Craycombe House
- 1787: Richard Harrison of Temple Langhern
- 1788: John Baker of Waresley
- 1789: John Spooner, of Leigh Court
- 1790: Philip Gresley of Salwarpe
- 1791: John Pershouse of Shelsley
- 1791: Henry Wakeman of Perdiswell
- 1792: Fleetwood Packhurst of Ripple
- 1793: John Steward of Stone
- 1794: Thomas Farley of Hallow
- 1795: William Waldron of Stourbridge
- 1796: Thomas Hill of Broom
- 1797: Moses Harpur of Astley
- 1798: John Addenbrook of Wollaston
- 1799: Edward Dixon of Dudley

== 19th century ==
- 5 February 1800: William Smith, of Eardiston
- 11 February 1801: John Zachary, of Areley
- 18 February 1801: Thomas Phillips, of Broadway
- 3 February 1802: Thomas Newnham, of Broadwas
- 3 February 1803: John Philips, of Winterdyne
- 1 February 1804: Edward Knight, of Wolverley
- 8 May 1804: Thomas Holmes, later Thomas Hunter, of Beoley
- 6 February 1805: John Amphlett, of Clent
- 1 February 1806: Sir Thomas Winnington, 3rd Bt, of Stanford Court
- 4 February 1807: Thomas Bland, of Ham Court
- 3 February 1808: Sir John Pakington, 8th Baronet, of Westwood House
- 15 February 1809: Henry Bromley, of Abberley Hall
- 31 January 1810: Joseph Smith, of Sion Hill
- 8 February 1811: Thomas Hawkes, of Dudley
- 24 January 1812: John Baker, of Waresley
- 10 February 1813: Edmund Lechmere-Charlton, of Hanley, Worcestershire
- 4 February 1814: John Knight, of Lea Castle
- 13 February 1815: Edward Dixon, of Dudley
- 1816: Joseph Lea of The Hill, Stourbridge
- 1817: John Taylor of Strensham Court
- 1818: Samuel Wall of Worcester
- 1819: John Jeffreys of Blakebrooke
- 1820: Richard Griffiths of Thorngrove Park
- 1821: Elias Isaac of Boughton
- 1822: Samuel Ryland, formerly of the Laurels, near Birmingham, and then of the Priory, near Warwick
- 1823: John Williams of Pitmaston
- 1824: Sir Christopher Sidney Smith, 2nd Baronet of Eardiston House
- 1825: Thomas Shrawley Vernon of Shrawley died and replaced by Sir Thomas Phillipps, Bt of Middle Hill
- 1826: James Taylor of Moor Green
- 1827: George Farley of Henwick
- 1828: George Meredith of Berington
- 1829: Edward Rudge of Abbey Manor House
- 1830: John Scott of Stourbridge and Great Barr third cousin of Samuel Ryland, High Sheriff in 1822)
- 1831: Osman Ricardo of Bromsberrow Place
- 1832: Joseph John Martin of Ham Court
- 1833: John Brown of Lea Castle
- 1834: John Howard Galton, of Hadsor House
- 1835: Sir Edward Blount, 8th Baronet, of Mawley Hall
- 1836: Sir Offley Wakeman, 2nd Baronet, of Perdiswell
- 1837: Wilson Aylesbury Roberts of Bewdley
- 1838: Robert Berkeley, junior, of Spetchley
- 1839: William Congreve Russell, of Kings Heath
- 1840: James Foster, of Stourbridge
- 1841: Thomas Charles Hornyold, of Blackmore Park
- 1842: Edward Holland, of Lenchwick
- 1843: William Robins, of Hagley
- 1844: John Richards of Wassell Grove
- 1845: Thomas Simcox Lea, of Astley Hall
- 1846: William Hemming, of Fox Lydiate House
- 1847: Edward Gresley Stone, of Chambers Court
- 1848: Joseph Frederick Ledsam, of Northfield
- 1849: John Dent, of Walcot
- 1850: John Gregory Watkins, of Woodfield
- 1851: Sir Thomas Winnington, 4th Baronet of Stanford Court
- 1852: Sir Edmund Hungerford Lechmere, Bart. of The Rhydd
- 1853: Charles Noel of Bell Hall, Belbroughton
- 1854: Edward Bearcroft of Mere Hall, Bromsgrove
- 1855: William Dowdeswell of Pull Court, near Tewkesbury
- 1856: Francis Tongue Rufford of Prescot House, near Stourbridge
- 1857: Edward Vincent Wheeler of Kyre House
- 1858: Samuel Baker of Thorngrove, near Worcester
- 1859: William Chamberlain Hemming of Spring Grove, Bewdley
- 1860: Ferdinando Dudley Lea Smith of The Grange, near Halesowen
- 1861: James Moilliet of Abberley Hall, near Worcester
- 1862: Sir Edmund Lechmere, 3rd Baronet of The Rhyd, Worcester
- 1863: Richard Hemming of Bentley Manor, Bromsgrove
- 1864: Harman Grisewood of Daylesford House
- 1865: Albert Hudson Royds of Crown East, near Worcester
- 1866: Edward Charles Rudge of Abbey Manor, Evesham
- 1867: Richard William Johnson of Bricklehampton Hall
- 1868: Charles Michael Berington of Little Malvern Court
- 1869: John Vincent Hornyold, of Blackmore Park, Upton-on-Severn
- 1870: Thomas Rowley Hill of Catherine Hill House, Worcester
- 1871: William Hanford Flood of Woollas Hall, near Pershore
- 1872: Henry Sales Scobell of the Abbey, Pershore
- 1873: Sir Harry Foley Vernon, Bt of Hanbury Hall, Droitwich
- 1874: Joseph Jones of Abberley Hall
- 1875: Edward Waldron Haywood of Redditch
- 1876: George Wallace of Eardiston, near Tenbury
- 1877: Robert Martin of Overbury Court, Tewkesbury
- 1878: Frederick Elkington of Moseley Hall, Birmingham
- 1879: Edward Bickerton Evans of Whitbourne Hall, near Worcester
- 1880: Robert Woodward of Arley Castle, near Bewdley
- 1881: Charles Castle of Hawford House, near Worcester
- 1882: George Edward Martin of Ham Court, Upton-on-Severn
- 1883: Henry Walker of Perdiswell Hall, near Worcester
- 1884: Henry Bramwell of Crown east Court, Worcester
- 1885: James Dyson Perrins of Davenham Bank, Great Malvern
- 1886: Victor Milward of The Holloway, Redditch
- 1887: William Edward Everitt of Finstall, Bromsgrove
- 1888: John Henry Crane of Oakhampton, Astley near Stourport
- 1889: John Brinton of Moor Hall, Stourport
- 1890: William Jones of Abberley Hall, Stourport
- 1891: George Rushout Godson, of The Court, Tenbury
- 1892: Michael Tomkinson of Franche Hall, near Kidderminster
- 1893: Edward Vincent Vashon Wheeler of Newnham Court, Tenbury
- 1894: Sir Francis Salwey Winnington, 5th Baronet of Stanford Court, Worcester
- 1895: Henry Allen Wakeman Newport of Sandbourne, Bewdley
- 1896: George William Grosvenor of Broome House, near Stourbridge
- 1897: Admiral Richard Frederick Britten of Kenswick, Worcester
- 1898: John Howard Cartland of the Priory, Kings Heath
- 1899: Charles William Dyson Perrins of Davenham, Malvern

== 20th century ==
- 1900: Sir Benjamin Hingley, 1st Baronet, of Hatherton Lodge, Cradley
- 1901: Sir Henry Foley Lambert,, of Enville Hall, near Stourbridge.
- 1902: Edward Alfred Broome of Areley Court, Stourport
- 1903: Sir John Charles Holder, of Pitmaston, Moor Green, Birmingham
- 1904: Walter Holland, of Wood Hall, Norton, near Worcester
- 1905: Edward Webb, of Studley Court, Stourbridge
- 1906: Francis Wigley Greswolde-Williams
- 1907: Edward James Morton of Heathfield, Wolverley, Kidderminster
- 1908: Hakewill Tresyllian Williams of Churchill Court, Kidderminster
- 1909: Robert Valentine Berkeley of Spetchley Park, Worcester
- 1910: George Ferguson Chance of Clent Grove
- 1911: Sir George Benjamin Hingley of High Park, Droitwich
- 1912: Rowland Hill of The Firs, Kidderminster
- 1913: Herbert James Whiteley, of Thorngrove, near Worcester
- 1914: James Ashwin of Bretforton Manor, Honeybourne, Worcestershire
- 1915: Charles Pelham Lane of Moundsley Hall, King's Norton
- 1916: John Bowen of Rochford, Strensham Hill, Moseley, Birmingham
- 1917: Joseph Silvers Williams-Thomas of Parkfield, Stourbridge
- 1918: Lieut.-Colonel Alfred Henry Hudson of Wick House, Pershore
- 1919: Frederick John Pearson of The Birches, Hagley, Stourbridge
- 1920: Lieut.-Colonel Charles Frederick Milward, of The Leys, Alvechurch
- 1921: Harry Edward Dixey of Woodgate, Malvern
- 1922: George Hatton, of Hagley House, Stourbridge
- 1923: Alfred Harold Wiggin of Bordesley Hall, Alvechurch
- 1924: Capt. Edward George Spencer-Churchill of Northwick Park, Blockley, S. O., Worcestershire
- 1925: Owen Francis Grazebrook of Himley House, Dudley
- 1926: Richard Stuart Todd of Clent Grove, Clent, Stourbridge
- 1927: Cecil Charles Brinton of Yew Tree House, Belbroughton, near Stourbridge
- 1928: Boultbee Brooks, of Blackwell Court, Bromsgrove
- 1929: Major James Allan Dyson Perrins, of Waresley House, near Kidderminster
- 1930: William Humble Eric, Viscount Ednam of Himley Hall, Dudley
- 1931: Sir Richard Christopher Brooke, of Abberley
- 1932: Charles Francis Dyson Perrins of High Park, Droitwich
- 1933: Robert George Wilmot Berkeley, of Spetchley Park
- 1934: William Harcourt Webb of Spring Grove, Bewdley
- 1935: Cyril Edward Lloyd of Church House, Broom, near Stourbridge
- 1936: Reginald Seymour Brinton of Croft, Kidderminster
- 1937: John Greswolde-Williams of Broadwas Court, near Worcester
- 1938: Robert Holland-Martin of Overbury Court, Tewkesbury
- 1939: John Ernest Grosvenor of Sillins, near Redditch
- 1940: Walter Maxwell Hannay of Spring Hill House, Moreton-in-Marsh, Glos
- 1941: William John Thompson of Harborough Hall, Blakedown, Kidderminster
- 1942: William Hugh Stobart Chance of Caspidge, near Bromsgrove
- 1943: Major Harold Petit Rushton of Phepson Manor, Droitwich
- 1944: John Richard Hugh Sumner of Rashwood Court, Droitwich
- 1945: Lieut-Colonel Edward Gordon Thin, of Aston Somerville Hall, Broadway
- 1946: Gerald Tomkinson of Heathfield, Wolverley, Kidderminster
- 1947: Ernest Charles Lister Bearcroft of Mere Hall, Hanbury, Droitwich
- 1948: Kenneth Henry Wilson of Park Hall, near Kidderminster
- 1949: Lieut-Col. William Herbert Taylor of The Moors, Birlingham, Pershore
- 1950: John Christopher Wilson of Hill House, Wolverley, Kidderminster
- 1951: Hubert Silvers Williams-Thomas of Old Rectory, Broome, Stourbridge
- 1952: Brigadier Charles Richard Britten, of Kenswick Manor, near Worcester
- 1953: Lieut.-Colonel Leslie George Gray-Cheape of Sillins, near Redditch
- 1954: Henry Ashwin of Bretforton Manor, Evesham
- 1955: Edward Harry Osmund Carpenter of Holbeache, Trimpley, near Bewdley
- 1956: Gerard Norman Percival-Humphries of Drayton House, Belbroughton, near Stourbridge
- 1957: Lieut.-Colonel Osbert Walter Dudley Smith of Levant Lodge, Earls Croome, Worcester
- 1958: Lieut.-Colonel Richard Arthur Wiggin, of Oak Hill, Uphampton, Ombersley
- 1959: Lieut.-Colonel Henry Rodolph Hugh Davies of The Steward's House, Elmley Castle, Pershore
- 1960: Eliot Charles Stewart Howard, of Duckswich House, Upton-on-Severn
- 1961: Esme Tatton Cecil Brinton of Hillhampton House, Great Witley
- 1962: Berwick Hungerford Lechmere of Whittemere, Hanley Castle
- 1963: Major Michael John Webb of The Croft, Wychbold, near Droitwich
- 1964: Lieut-Colonel Henry James Gumming Lattey, of Hallow Mount, Hallow
- 1965: James Montagu Carpenter of Eardington Manor, near Bridgnorth
- 1966: Major John Montagu Smyth of Dripshill House, Hanley Castle, Worcester
- 1967: Robert John Grantley Berkeley of Spetchley Park, near Worcester
- 1968: Captain Sir (Herbert) Maurice Huntington-Whiteley, of The Old Hill, Astley, Stourport-on-Severn
- 1969: Christopher Paget Norbury of Sherridge, near Malvern
- 1970: Major Henry Robert Mansel Porter, of Brockham, Birlingham, near Pershore
- 1971: Hugo Baldwin Huntington-Whiteley of Ripple Hall, Tewkesbury
- 1972: Robin Darell Unwin, of Longdon Hall, Tewkesbury, Gloucestershire
- 1973: Thomas Patrick Berington of Little Malvern Court, Malvern
- 1974–1997 See High Sheriff of Hereford and Worcester
- 1998: Simon William Britten Dereham, of Sapness Farm, Woolhope, Herefordshire.
- 1999: Rosalie Joan Dawes, Birtsmorton Court, near Malvern

== 21st century ==
- 2000: Thomas Hone, of Bosbury House
- 2001: Andrew William Dyson Perrins, of The Hyde
- 2002: Col Sir Piers Henry George Bengough of Great House
- 2003: Georgina Sarah Henrietta Britten-Long, of Hill Farm
- 2004: James Donald Nicholas, of Welsh Court
- 2005: Andrew William Grant, of Bransford Manor
- 2006: Lt-Gen Sir John Paul Foley
- 2007: John Sarne Yorke
- 2008: Lt-Col Michael Robin Ogilvie Leigh
- 2009: Gilbert Greenall
- 2010: Elizabeth Hunter
- 2011: Lady Morrison of Madresfield Court
- 2012: Penelope Ann Lewis of Pershore
- 2013: Nicholas Philip Wentworth-Stanley of Broadway
- 2014: Michael Hogan of Tenbury
- 2015: Sir Anthony Edward Winnington, 7th Baronet
- 2016: Sir Nicholas Lechmere Bt of Severn End, Hanley Castle, Worcester
- 2017: Stephen A. Betts of Kidderminster
- 2018: Cassian Blaise Luke Lechmere Roberts of Shelsley Beauchamp
- 2019: Edward Walter Pope Holloway of Suckley, Worcester
- 2020: Lt-Col (Retd) Mark Lucian Jackson, of Pershore
- 2021: Richard John Amphlett
- 2022: Andrew Richard Manning-Cox
- 2023: Louise Caroline Hewett
- 2024: Charles William Moyle, of Clifton-Upon-Teme
- 2025: Ian James Crockatt Smith, of Lulsley
- 2026: Maynard Vincent Burton, Stourport on Severn
