= Walter de Beauchamp (nobleman) =

12th-century Norman sheriff in England

Sheriff of Worcestershire
- In office 1114–c. 1130
- Preceded by: Osbert d'Abetot
- Succeeded by: possibly Humphrey

Personal details
- Died: between 1130 and 1133
- Spouse: Emeline (?)
- Children: William de Beauchamp; Stephen de Beauchamp (?); Walter de Beauchamp (?)

Walter de Beauchamp (Note: Sometimes known as Walter I of Beauchamp, Walter of Beauchamp, Walter I de Beauchamp, or Walter de Bellocampo.) (died between 1130 and 1133) was a medieval nobleman and Sheriff of Worcestershire. Married to the daughter of one of his predecessors as sheriff, nothing is known for sure of his background before he appears as a witness to royal charters between 1108 and 1111. Beauchamp also inherited offices in the royal household from his father-in-law and also appears to have been a royal forester. He and another nobleman divided some of the lands of his father-in-law, but the two families disagreed about the division until the 12th century. He died between 1130 and 1133, and one of his descendants later became Earl of Warwick.

== Background and family ==
Beauchamp is sometimes known as Walter de Beauchamp of Elmley, to distinguish him from the members of the Beauchamp family of Bedford. He married the daughter of Urse d'Abetot, who is usually named Emeline, although her name is not given in contemporary records. Urse d'Abetot was the Sheriff of Worcestershire from around 1069 to around 1108. Beauchamp may have been a tenant of his father-in-law before his marriage. Nothing is known for sure of Beauchamp's background before he first witnessed a royal charter some time between 1108 and 1111. Some documents suggest that his father may have been named Peveral de Beauchamp and that he had a brother named William Peveral de Beauchamp, but the only identifiable Peveral is younger than Walter.

== Sheriff ==
In the 1110s, Beauchamp became Sheriff of Worcestershire, holding the office until 1130. Some sources state he received the office in 1114, and others place the acquisition of the office between December 1113 and April 1116. Beauchamp inherited most of d'Abetot's lands and the hereditary office of Sheriff of Worcestershire when Roger d'Abetot, Urse's son, forfeited his lands and offices after being exiled by Henry I for murder. King Henry I of England granted Beauchamp the right to hunt wolves and foxes in the royal forests of Worcestershire. Along with the right to hunt in the royal forests came a grant of the right to keep pheasants on his own lands, and the right to fine anyone hunting the birds without his permission. Because of the king's promotion of Beauchamp, he is considered one of Henry I's "new men".

Beauchamp probably held the office of royal forester for Worcestershire as well as sheriff. The evidence for this is that after Beauchamp's death, his son William was granted the revenues from the royal forests of Worcestershire at the same rate as his father had held them; this strongly implies that the elder held the office of forester. The historian Judith Green felt that Walter de Beauchamp might possibly have held the office of constable, which had been held by his father-in-law, although the historian C. Warren Hollister felt that Beauchamp definitely did hold the office. He also upheld the royal office of dispenser, an office which later became known as a butler. He acquired this because his wife inherited the office from her father. The date when he acquired the office is unknown. While a member of the royal household, Beauchamp witnessed a number of royal charters, mainly when the king was in England.

Beauchamp and the Bishop of Worcester had a dispute over the lands that Beauchamp inherited from d'Abetot. The dispute caused the two sides to agree to the creation of the Worcester Survey, a land survey undertaken in Worcestershire sometime between 1108 and 1118 that shows changes in land ownership after the Domesday Book.

D'Abetot's widow, Adeliza, granted her dower lands in the county of Worcestershire to Beauchamp, which was confirmed by King Henry sometime between 1123 and 1129, although the document cannot be dated more precisely than that. In 1130, at Michaelmas, Henry allowed Beauchamp not to pay geld on his lands in Berkshire, and he is mentioned in the 1130 Pipe Roll as still living.

== Death and legacy ==
Sometime between 1130 and 1133, Beauchamp died, and his son William de Beauchamp took over his lands. Stephen de Beauchamp, a tenant on the Beauchamp lands and a friend of Robert of Gloucester, was likely a younger son of Walter's. The historian David Crouch says that another son was Walter, who is recorded as William's brother and was a follower of Waleran, Count of Meulan. Beauchamp was the ancestor of the Beauchamp family of Elmley in Worcestershire, a member of which, William de Beauchamp, became Earl of Warwick.

The lands and offices of Urse's brother Robert were divided between Beauchamp and Robert Marmion. Marmion and Beauchamp disagreed about the division of the lands, leading to a long dispute between the two families that was only settled in the late 12th century. Some sources state that another daughter of Urse d'Abetot married Robert Marmion, which was the reason for the division of the lands and offices between the two men. Other sources are less sure, accepting this as one possibility among several for the division between the Marmion and Beauchamp families. Because there are no contemporary sources showing that Urse had any children besides his son and the daughter who married Beauchamp, another possibility is that Urse's brother Robert had a daughter who married Marmion and that Urse managed to acquire part of her inheritance on the strength of his friendship with King William II of England.
