= Elmley Castle =

Village in Worcestershire, England

Coordinates: 52°4′15″N 2°1′34″W

- Village and civil parish
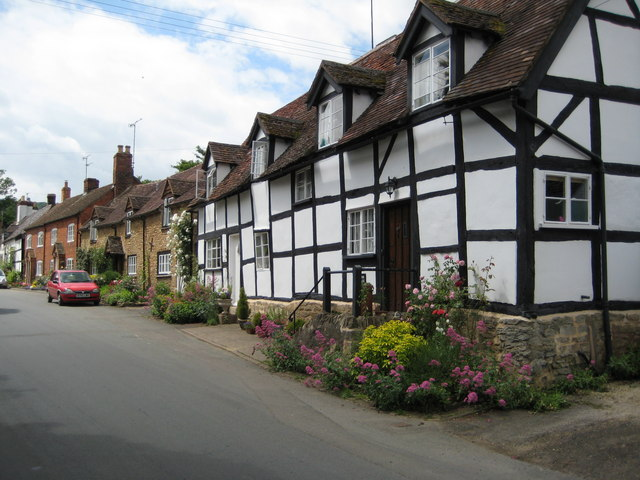
- Grooms Cottage

- Location within Worcestershire
- Population: 580
- OS grid reference: SO982413
- Civil parish: Elmley Castle
- District: Wychavon
- Shire county: Worcestershire
- Region: West Midlands
- Country: England
- Sovereign state: United Kingdom
- Post town: Pershore
- Postcode district: WR10
- Dialling code: 01386
- UK Parliament: West Worcestershire

Elmley Castle is a village and civil parish in Worcestershire, in England, United Kingdom. It is located on the north side of Bredon Hill, 3 miles south-east of Pershore, in the local government district of Wychavon.

== Amenities and history ==
The village had a population of 580 in 2021, and retains public amenities such as a numerous bus routes, a public house, a primary school, a local shop selling local produce, and church.

The remaining public house is now called "The Queen Elizabeth Inn", after Elizabeth I, who is said to have stopped there in August 1575. According to local legend, Elizabeth I was presented with a hat on her arrival in the village on the road from the nearby town of Pershore. The slope upwards out of the village at that point is still known as "Besscaps".

The remains of a stone cross are still present in the centre of the village. Its age is unknown, and a significant portion remains underground.

The church of St. Mary dates from the end of the 11th century, the chancel shows herringbone pattern stonework in the external walls, the font has a 15th-century octagonal bowl on a 13th-century square base decorated with stone carved serpents and dragons and the church was much added to in succeeding centuries. It contains grand monuments to Thomas, 1st Earl of Coventry and 17th century effigies of members of the Savage family. The decline in the number of local Christian worshippers has led to a reduced service schedule at the church.

== Castle ==
The ruins of an important Norman and medieval castle, from which the village derives its name, are located in the deer park, just over half a mile south, on Bredon Hill. The castle is supposed to have been built by Robert d'Abitot le Despenser in the years following the Norman Conquest. After his death (post 1098) it descended to his brother, Urse the sheriff, and on his death c. 1108, it then fell to his son and heir, Roger d'Abitot, who was unfortunately banished c. 1114, and it was then bestowed upon his sister Emmeline d'Abitot's husband, Walter Beauchamp. It remained in the powerful Beauchamp family as their chief seat until William de Beauchamp inherited the earldom and castle of Warwick from his maternal uncle, William Maudit, 8th Earl of Warwick, in 1268. Thereafter, Elmley Castle remained a secondary property of the Earls of Warwick until it was surrendered to the Crown in 1487. In 1528 the castle seems to have been still habitable, for Walter Walshe was then appointed constable and keeper, and ten years later Urian Brereton succeeded to the office. In 1544, however, prior to the grant to Christopher Savage (d.1545), who had been an Esquire of the Body of King Henry VIII, a survey was made of the manor and castle of Elmley, and it was found that the castle, strongly situated upon a hill surrounded by a ditch and wall, was completely uncovered and in decay.

An Elizabethan stone mansion succeeded the castle, on flatter ground, built for William Savage of Elmley Castle (1554-1616). Queen Elizabeth stayed on 20 August 1575 after visiting Worcester. This building was entirely remodelled in 1702.
