= Judith Green (historian) =

English medieval historian (born 1947)

Judith Green is an English medieval historian, who is emerita professor of medieval history at the University of Edinburgh, Scotland.

== Career ==
A graduate of King's College, London and Somerville College, Oxford, Green held a research fellowship and then a lectureship at the University of St Andrews before transferring to a lectureship at Queen's University, Belfast. There she became a reader and, eventually, professor.

In 2005, Green took the professorship at Edinburgh, retiring in 2011.

Green has specialised in Anglo-Norman England.

== Notable works ==
- The Government of England Under Henry I, (Cambridge, 1986)
- The Aristocracy of Norman England, (Cambridge, 1997)
- Henry I, King of England and Duke of Normandy, (Cambridge, 2006)
- Forging the Kingdom: Power in English Society 973-1189. Cambridge, UK: Cambridge University Press. 2017. ISBN 978-0-521-15829-9.
- The Normans: Power, Conquest and Culture in 11th century Europe (New Haven, 2022)

== Sources ==
- University of Edinburgh Staff Profile Page: Judith Green BA, AKC, DPhil, FRHistS, 1 February 2018
- "University of Edinburgh Staff Profile Page: Professor Judith Green"
