= William Mauduit, 8th Earl of Warwick =

English nobleman

William Mauduit, 8th Earl of Warwick or William Maudit (c. 1221 – 8 January 1268) was an English nobleman and participant in the Second Barons' War.

He was the son of Lady Alice de Newburgh (daughter of 4th Earl of Warwick from his second wife, Alice de Harcourt) and William de Mauduit, and thus the grandson of Waleran de Beaumont, 4th Earl of Warwick. His father was Lord of Hanslope and hereditary Chamberlain of the Exchequer, a title that went back to another William Mauduit who held that office for King Henry I of England. After the death of his half-cousin, Margaret de Beaumont, 7th Countess of Warwick suo jure – without issue in June 1253 – he succeeded to the title Earl of Warwick which was passed down to him.

William adhered to King Henry III in the Second Barons' War of 1264–67. During that time, there was a surprise attack on Warwick Castle, his residence, by the forces of Simon de Montfort, 6th Earl of Leicester from Kenilworth Castle, led by John Giffard. According to 15th-century chronicler John Rous, the walls along the northeastern side of Warwick Castle were destroyed, so "that it should be no strength to the king". William and his wife were then taken as prisoners to Kenilworth Castle and were held there until the payment of a ransom of nineteen hundred marks was given.

William married Alice de Segrave, daughter of Gilbert de Segrave (son of Stephen de Segrave and his first wife) and Amabil de Chaucombe, but had no issue from the marriage. When he died, his estates passed to his sister Isabel who had married William de Beauchamp, Lord of Elmley. Isabel died shortly after her brother, and the title passed to her son William de Beauchamp, 9th Earl of Warwick.

Peerage of England
Preceded by Margaret de Beaumont and John du Plessis	Earl of Warwick; 1253–1268	Succeeded by William de Beauchamp
