= Anne Welles, Countess of Ormond =

English-born Irish countess (1360–1397)

- Born: 1360; Grainsby, Lincolnshire, England
- Died: 13 November 1397 (aged 36–37)
- Spouse: James Butler, 3rd Earl of Ormond
- Issue: James Butler, 4th Earl of Ormond; Anne Butler; Sir Richard Butler
- Father: John de Welles, 4th Lord Welles
- Mother: Maud de Ros

Anne Butler, Countess of Ormond (née Welles; 1360 – 13 November 1397), was the first wife of Irish noble James Butler, 3rd Earl of Ormond, and the mother of James Butler, 4th Earl of Ormond. She was the first countess of Ormond to live at Kilkenny Castle, Ireland.

According to Frederick Tupper, Professor of English at the University of Vermont, she was commemorated as "Anelida, Queen of Armenia" in Geoffrey Chaucer's poem Anelida and Arcite.

== Family and lineage ==
Anne Welles was born in Grainsby, Lincolnshire, England in 1360, the daughter of John de Welles, 4th Baron Welles (23 August 1334 – 11 October 1361) and Maud de Ros (died 9 December 1388). She had an elder brother John de Welles, 5th Baron Welles (born 20 April 1352), who married Eleanor de Mowbray, by whom he had issue. She had a sister Margery de Welles, who married firstly, John de Huntingfield, 1st Baron Huntingfield and secondly, Stephen Scrope, 2nd Baron Scrope of Masham.

Her paternal grandparents were Sir Adam de Welles, 3rd Baron Welles and Margaret Bardolf, and her maternal grandparents were William de Ros, 2nd Baron de Ros and Margery Badlesmere, the eldest daughter of Bartholomew de Badlesmere, 1st Baron Badlesmere and Margaret de Clare.

== Marriage ==
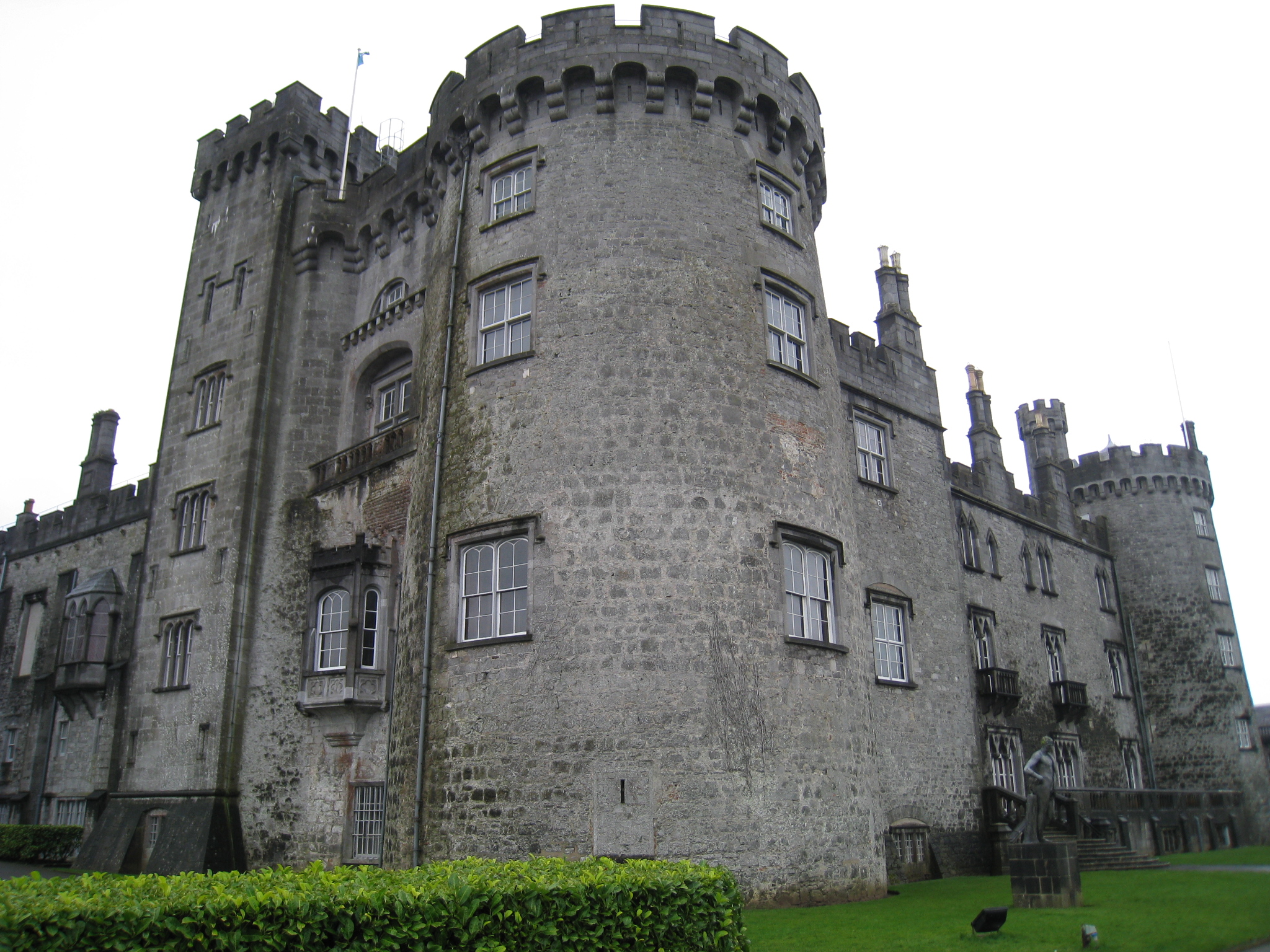
Kilkenny Castle, Ireland. After 1391, this was the principal residence of the Earls of Ormond. Anne Welles was the first countess of Ormond to reside at the castle

Prior to 17 June 1386, Anne Welles married James Butler, 3rd Earl of Ormond (died 6 September 1405), son of James Butler, 2nd Earl of Ormond and Elizabeth Darcy. He twice served as Lord Justice of Ireland. Upon her marriage to the earl, she assumed the title Countess of Ormond.

In September 1391, James purchased Kilkenny Castle from Hugh le Despenser, and the Ormonds made this magnificent stone fortification set in a park their chief residence with the earl using it as a base from which he ruled over the district. Previously they lived at Gowran Castle. James and Anne hosted King Richard II when he visited Kilkenny Castle in 1395. King Richard showed his favour to the earl and countess by acting as godfather to their second son, named Richard in honour of the king.

It was suggested by Frederick Tupper, Professor of English at the University of Vermont, that Anne was commemorated as "Anelida, Queen of Armenia", in Geoffrey Chaucer's poem Anelida and Arcite with "Arcite" having been her husband.

=== Issue ===
James and Anne had three children:

- James Butler, 4th Earl of Ormond (1392 – 22 August 1452), known as The White Earl. He married firstly, Joan de Beauchamp, by whom he had five children, including James Butler, 5th Earl of Ormond, John Butler, 6th Earl of Ormond, and Thomas Butler, 7th Earl of Ormond. Thomas was the great-grandfather of queen consort Anne Boleyn. He married secondly, Joan FitzGerald.
- Anne Butler, married John Wogan, by whom she had issue.
- Sir Richard Butler, of Poulstown, Kilkenny (born 1395), married Catherine O'Reilly, daughter of Gildas O'Reilly, Lord of East Breffny, by whom he had issue.

== Death ==
On 26 June 1397, Anne issued a lease to Sir John Drayton, of the manor of Aylesbury, Buckinghamshire, and rents and appurtenances of the towns of Aylesbury and Burton. Anne Welles died on 13 November 1397, around the age of 37. The Earl of Ormond married secondly, Katherine FitzGerald of Desmond, by whom he had four children. The Earl had an illegitimate son, Thomas Le Boteller, Prior of Kilmainham by an unknown mistress.

== Sources ==
- Ormonde Pedigree (Burke's Peerage Baronetage and Knightage, 103rd edition, 1962 pp. 1871–1874)
