= Joan de Beauchamp =

Joan de Beauchamp may refer to:

- Joan Butler, Countess of Ormond (1396–1430), daughter of William de Beauchamp, 1st Baron Bergavenny and Lady Joan FitzAlan
- Joan de Beauchamp, Baroness Bergavenny (1375–1435), English noblewoman, wife of William de Beauchamp, 1st Baron Bergavenny of the Welsh Marches
- Joan de Beauchamp, sister of William de Beauchamp, 9th Earl of Warwick
- Joan de Beauchamp, daughter of Thomas de Beauchamp, 11th Earl of Warwick and Lady Katherine Mortimer
