= William Beauchamp, 1st Baron Bergavenny =

English peer (c.1343–1411)

William de Beauchamp
- Baron Bergavenny
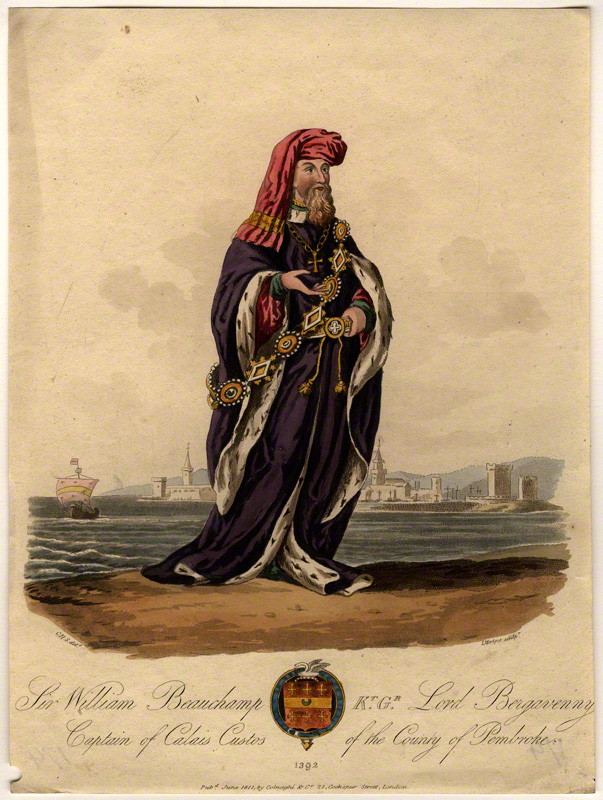
- Sir William Beauchamp, 1st Baron Bergavenny, KG
- Born: c. 1343
- Died: 8 May 1411 (aged 67–68)
- Noble family: Beauchamp
- Spouses: Lady Joan FitzAlan (m. 1392–1411; his death)
- Issue: Richard de Beauchamp, 1st Earl of Worcester; Joan Butler, Countess of Ormond
- Father: Thomas Beauchamp, 11th Earl of Warwick
- Mother: Katherine Mortimer

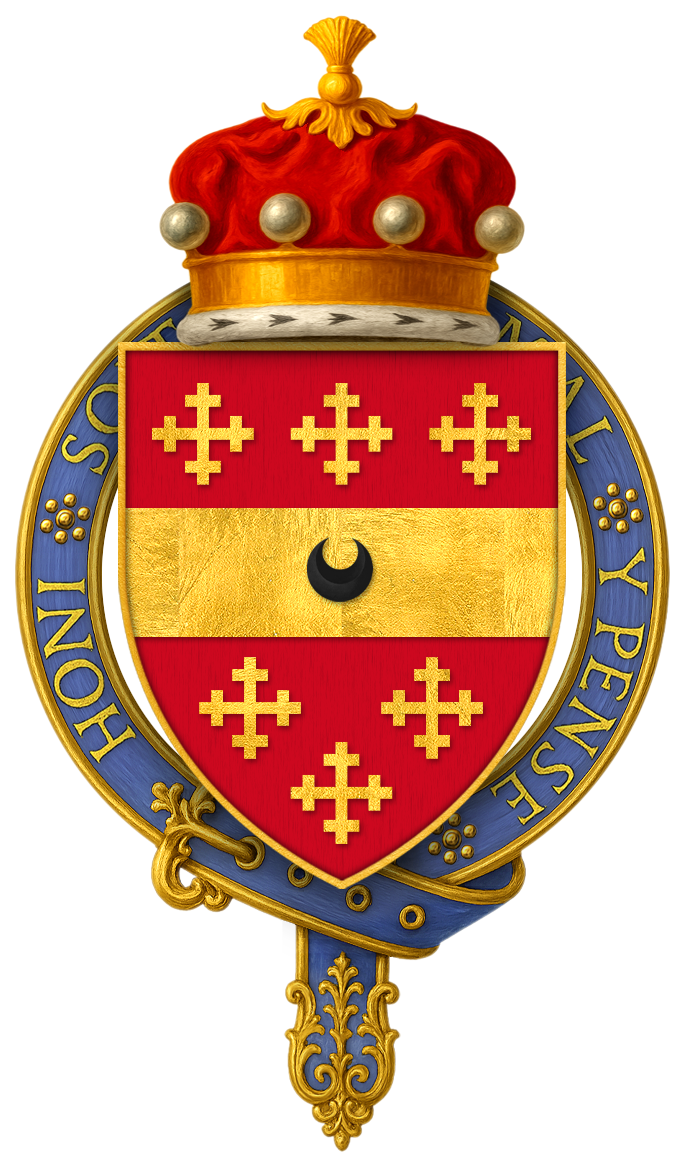
Garter-encircled Arms of William Beauchamp, 1st Baron Bergavenny, KG, viz: "Gules a fess between three crosses crosslet Or a crescent for difference on the fess Sable."

William de Beauchamp, 1st Baron Bergavenny (c. 1343 – 8 May 1411) was an English peer.

Beauchamp was the fourth son of Thomas Beauchamp, 11th Earl of Warwick, and Katherine Mortimer. He served under Sir John Chandos during the Hundred Years' War, and was created a Knight of the Garter in 1376.

Sir William Beauchamp served on the royal council of king Richard II as sub-chamberlain or acting chief chamberlain of the household from 1378 to 1380 (in place of the formal chamberlain, Robert de Vere (9th Earl of Oxford), who held it by hereditary right, but was still considered a minor). Beauchamp served as Captain of Calais in 1383.

Upon the death of his first cousin once removed, John Hastings, 3rd Earl of Pembroke, on 30 December 1389, William inherited the lordship of Abergavenny, including Abergavenny Castle. He was summoned to Parliament on 23 July 1392 as "Willilmo Beauchamp de Bergavenny", by which he is held to have become Baron Bergavenny, a barony by writ. In 1399, he was appointed Justiciar of South Wales and Governor of Pembroke. He entailed the castle and Honour of Abergavenny on the issue male of his body, with remainder to his brother Thomas Beauchamp, 12th Earl of Warwick and his heirs male; his wife enjoyed it in dower until her death in 1435. Bergavenny died in 1411 and was buried at Black Friars, Hereford.

== Marriage and offspring ==
Bergavenny married Lady Joan FitzAlan, daughter of Richard FitzAlan, 11th Earl of Arundel, and Elizabeth de Bohun, and they had the following children:

- Richard de Beauchamp, 1st Earl of Worcester, 2nd Baron Bergavenny (bef. 1397 – 1422), married Isabel le Despenser, daughter of Thomas Despenser, 1st Earl of Gloucester and Constance of York, by whom he had one daughter Elizabeth de Beauchamp, Baroness Bergavenny.
- Joan de Beauchamp (1396 – 3 August 1430), married 28 August 1413 James Butler, 4th Earl of Ormond, son of James Butler, 3rd Earl of Ormond and Anne Welles, by whom she had five children, including Thomas Butler, 7th Earl of Ormond.

== Ancestry ==
Ancestors of William Beauchamp, 1st Baron Bergavenny

16. William Beauchamp, 9th Earl of Warwick
8. William de Beauchamp, 9th Earl of Warwick
17. Isabella Maudit
4. Guy de Beauchamp, 10th Earl of Warwick
18. John FitzGeoffrey, Lord of Shere
9. Maud FitzJohn
19. Isabel Bigod
2. Thomas Beauchamp, 11th Earl of Warwick
20. Roger V de Toeni
10. Ralph VII de Toeni, Lord Toeni of Flamsted
21. Alice de Bohun
5. Alice de Toeni
22.
11. Mary
23.
1. William de Beauchamp, 1st Baron Bergavenny
24. Roger Mortimer, 1st Baron Mortimer
12. Edmund Mortimer, 2nd Baron Mortimer
25. Maud de Braose, Baroness Mortimer
6. Roger Mortimer, 1st Earl of March
26. Sir William de Fienes
13. Margaret de Fiennes
27. Blanche de Brienne
3. Katherine Mortimer
28. Geoffrey de Geneville, 1st Baron Geneville
14. Sir Piers de Genevelle
29. Maud de Lacy, Baroness Geneville
7. Joan de Geneville, 2nd Baroness Geneville
30. Hugh XII of Lusignan
15. Jeanne of Lusignan
31. Jeanne de Fougères

== Notes ==
Political offices
Preceded by Simon de Burley	Acting Chief Chamberlain; 1378–1380	Succeeded by Aubrey de Vere
Peerage of England
New creation	Baron Bergavenny; 1392–1411	Succeeded by Richard de Beauchamp
