= Thomas Beauchamp =

Thomas Beauchamp may refer to:

- Thomas Beauchamp, 11th Earl of Warwick (1313–1369), English nobleman and military commander
- Thomas Beauchamp, 12th Earl of Warwick (1338–1401), English nobleman

== See also ==
- Tom Beauchamp (1939–2025), American philosopher
