= Thomas de Beauchamp =

Thomas de Beauchamp may refer to:

- Thomas de Beauchamp, 11th Earl of Warwick (1313? – 1369), English nobleman and military commander during the Hundred Years' War
- Thomas de Beauchamp, 12th Earl of Warwick (1338/1339 – 1401), English medieval nobleman, and one of the primary opponents of Richard II
