= Katherine Mortimer, Countess of Warwick =

English countess (c. 1314–1369)

Katherine Mortimer
- Countess of Warwick
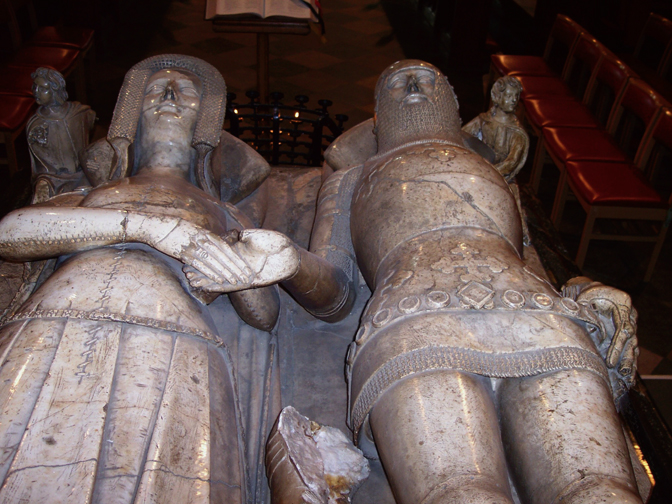
- Tomb effigies of Katherine Mortimer and Thomas de Beauchamp, 11th Earl of Warwick, St. Mary's Church, Warwick
- Born: 1314; Ludlow Castle, Shropshire, England
- Died: 4 August 1369 (aged 55)
- Buried: Collegiate Church of St. Mary, Warwick, Warwickshire, England.
- Noble family: Mortimer
- Spouse: Thomas de Beauchamp, 11th Earl of Warwick KG (m. 1319)
- Issue See details: Thomas de Beauchamp, 12th Earl of Warwick; William de Beauchamp, 1st Baron Bergavenny; Maud de Beauchamp, Baroness de Clifford; Philippa de Beauchamp, Countess of Stafford; Alice de Beauchamp, Baroness Beauchamp and Lady Gournay
- Father: Roger Mortimer, 1st Earl of March
- Mother: Joan de Geneville, Baroness Geneville

Katherine Mortimer, Countess of Warwick (c. 1314 – 4 August 1369) was the wife of Thomas de Beauchamp, 11th Earl of Warwick KG, an English peer, and military commander during the Hundred Years War. She was a daughter and co-heiress of Roger Mortimer, 1st Earl of March and Joan de Geneville, Baroness Geneville.

Sometime before 1355, she became an important figure at the royal court of King Edward III.

== Family and lineage ==
Katherine Mortimer was born at Ludlow Castle, Shropshire, England, in 1314, one of the twelve children and a co-heiress of Roger Mortimer, 1st Earl of March, and his wife Joan de Geneville, Baroness Geneville. Her paternal grandparents were Edmund Mortimer, 2nd Baron Mortimer and Margaret de Fiennes, and her maternal grandparents were Sir Piers de Geneville, of Trim Castle and Ludlow, and Jeanne of Lusignan.

Her father was de facto ruler of England together with his mistress Isabella of France, Queen consort of King Edward II, until his eventual capture and execution by the orders of King Edward III, eldest son of Isabella and King Edward II. The latter had been deposed in November 1326, and afterwards murdered by assassins acting under the orders of Mortimer and Queen Isabella. Katherine was sixteen years old when her father was hanged, Tyburn, London on 29 November 1330.

== Marriage ==
On 19 April 1319, when she was about five years old, Katherine was married to Thomas de Beauchamp, 11th Earl of Warwick, eldest son of Guy de Beauchamp, 10th Earl of Warwick and Alice de Toeni. Thomas was six years old. This is a marriage contract. Their marriage required a Papal dispensation as they were related within the prohibited third and fourth degrees.

Beauchamp had succeeded to the earldom at the age of two, therefore Katherine was styled Countess of Warwick from the time of her marriage until her death. The marriage had been arranged in July 1318 to settle a quarrel between the two families over the lordship of Elfael, which was thus given to Katherine as her marriage portion. For the term of his minority, Beauchamp's custody had been granted to Katherine's father, Roger Mortimer.

Katherine later became an important personage at the court of King Edward III. As a sign of royal favour she was chosen to stand as one of the godmothers, along with Queen Philippa of Hainault, to the latter's granddaughter, Philippa, Countess of Ulster, in 1355. This honour bestowed on Katherine is described by 19th century author Agnes Strickland according to the Friar's Genealogy: "Her [Philippa, Countess of Ulster] godmother also was of Warwick Countess, a lady likewise of great worthiness".

=== Issue ===
Katherine and Beauchamp together had sixteen children:

- Guy de Beauchamp (c. 1335 – 28 April 1360); married Philippa de Ferrers, daughter of Henry de Ferrers, 2nd Lord Ferrers of Groby and Isabel de Verdun, by whom he had two daughters. He died before his father after being mortally injured during the Siege of Chartres.
- Thomas de Beauchamp, 12th Earl of Warwick (16 March 1339 – 8 August 1401); married Margaret Ferrers, daughter of William Ferrers, 3rd Lord of Groby, and Margaret de Ufford, by whom he had issue, including Richard de Beauchamp, 13th Earl of Warwick.
- William Beauchamp, 1st Baron Bergavenny (c. 1343 – 8 May 1411); inherited the honour of Abergavenny. On 23 July 1392, married Lady Joan FitzAlan, daughter of Richard Fitzalan, 11th Earl of Arundel and Elizabeth de Bohun, by whom he had a son, Richard de Beauchamp, 1st Earl of Worcester, and a daughter, Joan de Beauchamp, 4th Countess of Ormonde. Queen consort Anne Boleyn was a notable descendant of the latter.
- Roger de Beauchamp (died 1361)
- Maud de Beauchamp (died 1403); married Roger de Clifford, 5th Baron de Clifford, by whom she had issue, including Thomas de Clifford, 6th Baron de Clifford.
- Philippa de Beauchamp; married Hugh de Stafford, 2nd Earl of Stafford, by whom she had nine children.
- Alice Beauchamp (died 1383); married firstly John Beauchamp, 3rd Baron Beauchamp of Somerset, and secondly Sir William Gournay. She died childless.
- Joan de Beauchamp; married Ralph Basset, 3rd Baron Basset of Drayton. She died childless.
- Isabella de Beauchamp (died 29 September 1416); married firstly John le Strange, 5th Baron Strange, and secondly, William de Ufford, 2nd Earl of Suffolk. Upon the latter's death, she became a nun. She died childless.
- Margaret de Beauchamp; married Guy de Montfort, and after his death, she became a nun. She died childless.
- Elizabeth de Beauchamp; married Thomas de Ufford KG.
- Anne de Beauchamp; married Walter de Cokesey.
- Juliana de Beauchamp
- Katherine de Beauchamp; became a nun at Shouldham Priory.
- Ramburne de Beauchamp had one child named Eleanora.

== Death and effigy ==
Katherine Mortimer died on 4 August 1369 at the age of about fifty-five. Two years before her death, in 1367, Katherine was a legatee in the will of her sister Agnes de Hastings, Countess of Pembroke.

Katherine was buried in the Collegiate Church of St. Mary, Warwick, Warwickshire. She lies alongside her husband, who died three months after her of the Black Death. Their tomb with well-preserved, alabaster effigies can be seen in the centre of the quire. Katherine is depicted wearing a frilled nebulée headdress with a honeycomb pattern and she is holding hands with Beauchamp. The sides of the tomb chest are decorated with figures of mourners, both male and female, in a variety of fashionable clothing.

== Ancestry ==
Ancestors of Katherine Mortimer, Countess of Warwick

Ralph de Mortimer
Roger Mortimer, 1st Baron Mortimer
Gladys the Dark
Edmund Mortimer, 2nd Baron Wigmore
William de Braose
Maud de Braose
Eva Marshal
Roger Mortimer, 1st Earl of March
Infelram de Fiennes
William de Fiennes
Isabelle Conde
Margaret de Fiennes
Jean de Brienne, Grand Butler of France
Blanche de Brienne
Jeanne, Dame de Chateaudun
Katherine Mortimer
Simon de Joinville
Geoffrey de Geneville, 1st Baron Geneville
Beatrix d'Auxonne
Peter de Geneville
Gilbert de Lacy, of Ewyas Lacy
Maud de Lacy
Isabel Bigod
Joan de Geneville, 2nd Baroness Geneville
Hugh XI of Lusignan, Count of La Marche
Hugh XIII, Count of La Marche
Yolande de Dreux, Countess of Penthièvre and of Porhoet
Joan of Lusignan
Raoul III, Sire de Fougères
Jeanne de Fougères
Isabelle de Craon

== Images ==
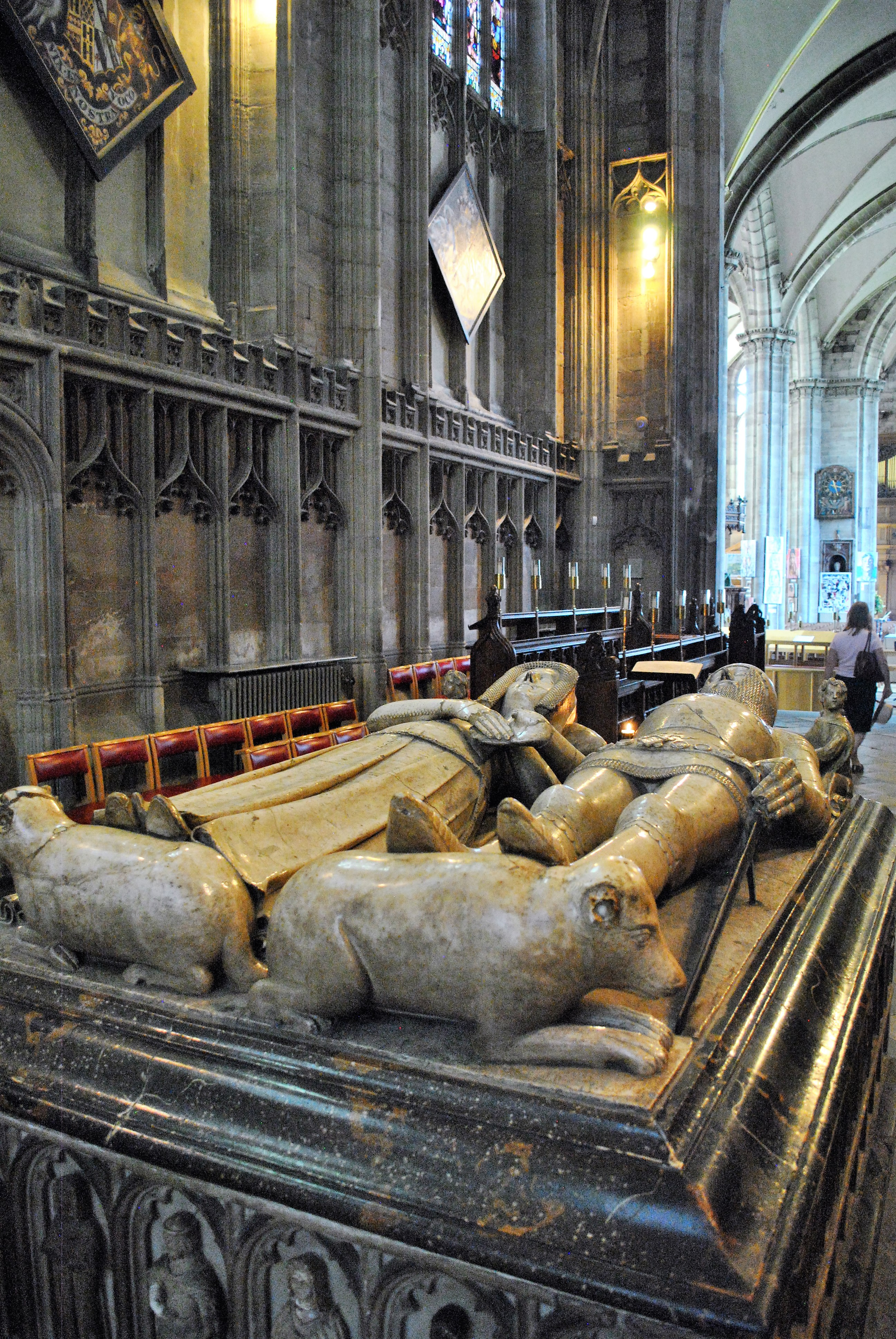
Thomas de Beauchamp, 11th Earl of Warwick & Katherine Mortimer effigies in Warwick St. Mary's church

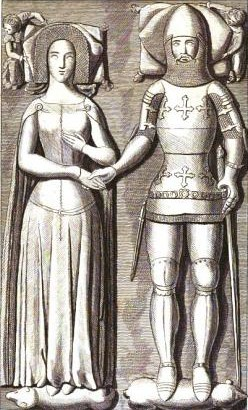
Drawing of effigies of Thomas de Beauchamp, 11th Earl of Warwick & Katherine Mortimer in Warwick St. Mary's church

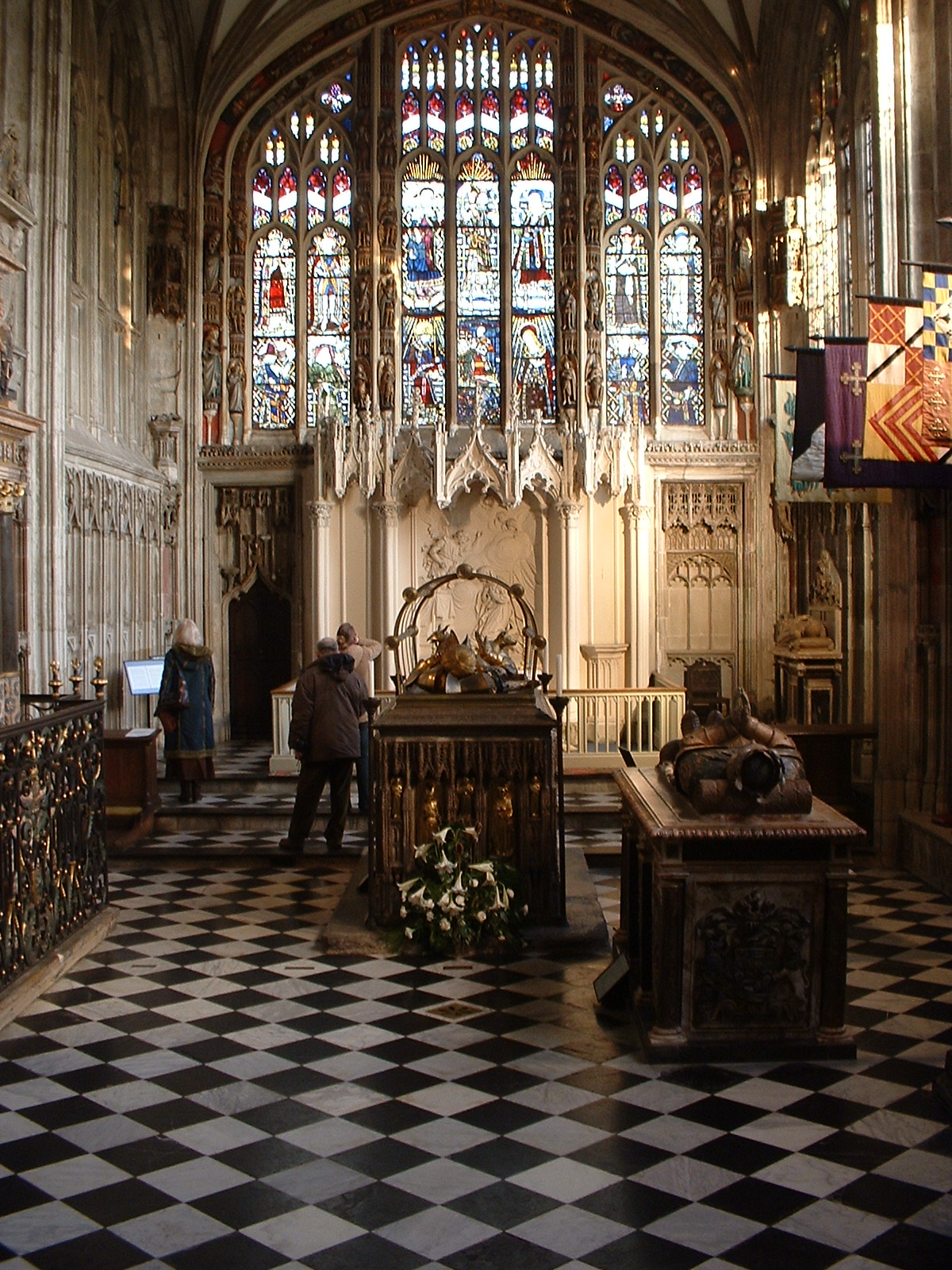
The stained glass at the Beauchamp Chapel at the College Church of St. Marys displays seven different Beauchamp coats of arms. Note the banner with Warwick's arms partially in view on the right

== Sources ==
- Mortimer, Ian (2003). The Greatest Traitor: The Life of Sir Roger Mortimer, Ruler of England 1327–1330. New York: St. Martin's Press. ISBN 0-312-34941-6.
