= Elizabeth Darcy, Countess of Ormond =

Elizabeth Darcy
- Countess of Ormond
- Born: Elizabeth Darcy; 3 April 1332; Platten, County Meath, Ireland
- Died: 24 March 1390 (aged 57)
- Spouses: James Butler, 2nd Earl of Ormond; Sir Robert Lukyn de Hereford
- Issue: Ralph Butler; Eleanor Butler; James Butler, 3rd Earl of Ormond; Thomas Butler; Catherine Butler; Joan Butler
- Father: Sir John Darcy, 1st Baron Darcy of Knaith
- Mother: Joan de Burgh

Elizabeth Butler (nee Darcy), Countess of Ormond (3 April 1332 – 24 March 1390), was the wife of Irish peer James Butler, 2nd Earl of Ormond, and the mother of his six children, including James Butler, 3rd Earl of Ormond.

== Family and lineage ==
Elizabeth Darcy was born on 3 April 1332 at Platten, County Meath, Ireland, the daughter of Sir John Darcy, 1st Baron Darcy de Knayth, Justiciar of Ireland, and his second wife Joan de Burgh. Sir John was a veteran of the Battle of Crecy. He held the offices of Constable of Nottingham Castle, Constable of the Tower of London, and Sheriff of Lancashire. From 1341- 1346, he was Chamberlain to King Edward III.

Elizabeth had a brother, Sir William Darcy, who married Catherine FitzGerald, by whom he had issue. She also had numerous half-siblings from her parents' previous marriages. Her father's first wife was Emeline Heron, by whom he had eight children, including his heir, John Darcy, 2nd Baron Darcy of Knaith. Elizabeth's mother's first husband had been Thomas FitzGerald, 2nd Earl of Kildare, by whom she had three sons, John FitzGerald, Richard FitzGerald, 3rd Earl of Kildare, and Maurice FitzGerald, 4th Earl of Kildare.

Elizabeth's paternal grandparents were Roger Darcy and Isabel d'Aton, and her maternal grandparents were Richard de Burgh, 2nd Earl of Ulster, and Margaret de Burgh, daughter of Sir John de Burgh and Cecily de Balliol.

One of her maternal aunts was Elizabeth de Burgh, the second wife of Robert the Bruce.

== Marriages and issue ==
On 15 May 1346, in Ormond, Ireland, when Elizabeth was fourteen, she married her first husband James Butler, 2nd Earl of Ormond, the son of James Butler, 1st Earl of Ormond. He was Lord Justice of Ireland in 1359, 1364 and 1376. He was also Constable of Dublin Castle in 1349. He was known as the Noble Earl; however, the Irish called him The Chaste. As they were related in the fourth degree of kinship, a papal dispensation was required for their marriage.

Upon her marriage to the Earl, Elizabeth assumed the title of Countess of Ormond. Historian Thomas Carte described her as having been a "wise and honourable lady".

James and Elizabeth had six children:

- Ralph Butler
- Eleanor Butler (died 1392), married Gerald FitzMaurice FitzGerald, 3rd Earl of Desmond, by whom she had issue, including the 4th and 6th Earls of Desmond.
- James Butler, 3rd Earl of Ormond (died 6 September 1405), before 17 June 1386, married firstly, Anne Welles, Countess of Ormond, daughter of John Welles, 4th Lord Welles and Maud de Ros, by whom he had issue, including James Butler, 4th Earl of Ormond. He married secondly, Katherine FitzGerald of Desmond, by whom he had further issue. In 1391, he purchased Kilkenny Castle.
- Thomas Butler
- Catherine Butler (born 1361), married firstly, Thomas Reade, by whom she had one son, Richard; and secondly, Thomas Fleming of Slane.
- Joan Butler, married Tiege O' Carroll

Elizabeth's husband died on 18 October 1382 in Knocktopher and was buried in Gowran Church, County Kilkenny. She married secondly, Sir Robert Lukyn de Hereford, Seneschal of the Liberty of Tipperary, between 28 December 1383 and 30 March 1384.

== Death ==
Elizabeth Darcy died on 24 March 1390, shortly before her 58th birthday.
