= Alice FitzAlan =

Alice FitzAlan (or Fitzalan) may refer to:

- Alice de Warenne, Countess of Arundel (1287–1338), wife of Edmund FitzAlan, 9th Earl of Arundel
- Alice FitzAlan, Countess of Kent, daughter of Richard FitzAlan, 10th Earl of Arundel
- Alice FitzAlan, Baroness Cherleton, daughter of Richard FitzAlan, 11th Earl of Arundel
