= Joan de Beauchamp, Baroness Bergavenny =

English noblewoman (1375–1435)

Joan de Beauchamp
- Baroness Bergavenny
- Born: 1375; Arundel Castle, Sussex, England
- Died: 14 November 1435 (aged 59–60)
- Buried: Black Friars, Hereford, England
- Noble family: Fitzalan
- Spouses: William de Beauchamp, 1st Baron Bergavenny (m. 1392–1411; his death)
- Issue: Richard de Beauchamp, 1st Earl of Worcester; Joan de Beauchamp, Countess of Ormond
- Parents: William de Beauchamp, 1st Baron Bergavenny
- Father: Richard Fitzalan, 11th Earl of Arundel
- Mother: Elizabeth de Bohun

Joan de Beauchamp, Baroness Bergavenny (née FitzAlan; 1375 – 14 November 1435) was an English noblewoman, and the wife of William de Beauchamp, 1st Baron Bergavenny of the Welsh Marches.

== Family and lineage ==
Lady Joan FitzAlan was born in 1375, at Arundel Castle, Sussex, England, one of the seven children of Richard Fitzalan, 4th Earl of Arundel, Earl of Surrey, and his first wife Elizabeth de Bohun. Her only surviving brother was Thomas Fitzalan, 12th Earl of Arundel, a major figure during the reign of Henry IV, and of whom Joan was his co-heiress. She had an older sister Lady Elizabeth FitzAlan who married five times. Her second husband was Thomas Mowbray, 1st Duke of Norfolk.

Her paternal grandparents were Richard Fitzalan, 10th Earl of Arundel and Eleanor of Lancaster, and her maternal grandparents were William de Bohun, 1st Earl of Northampton and Elizabeth de Badlesmere.

On 3 April 1385, her mother died. Joan was about ten years old. Her father married secondly, Philippa Mortimer on 15 August 1390, by whom he had a son, John Fitzalan, who was born in 1394. John died sometime after 1397.

On 21 September 1397, Joan's father, the Earl of Arundel, who was also one of the Lords Appellant, was beheaded on Tower Hill, London, on charges of high treason against King Richard II of England. The Earl had always enjoyed much popularity with the citizens of London. His titles and estates were forfeited to the Crown.

In October 1400, the new king Henry IV who had ascended the throne following Richard's deposition in 1399, restored the titles and estates to Thomas Fitzalan, Joan's brother. He became the 12th Earl of Arundel and Earl of Surrey. Although he married Beatrice, an illegitimate daughter of King John I of Portugal and Inez Perez Esteves, he died childless on 13 October 1415. The Earldom and castle of Arundel passed to a cousin John Fitzalan, 13th Earl of Arundel, and the remainder of his inheritance was divided among Joan and her two surviving sisters, Elizabeth and Margaret.

In 1431, Joan was involved in a dispute with Thomas Burdett in the Midlands.

== Marriage and issue ==
Before February 1396, Joan was married to William de Beauchamp, 1st Baron Bergavenny (c.1344 - 8 May 1411) the son of Thomas de Beauchamp, 11th Earl of Warwick and Katherine Mortimer. He was more than thirty years Joan's senior.

The marriage produced a son and a daughter:

- Richard de Beauchamp, 1st Earl of Worcester, 2nd Baron Bergavenny (born before 1397 – died 1422), married Isabel le Despenser, daughter of Thomas le Despenser, 1st Earl of Gloucester and Constance of York, by whom he had one daughter Elizabeth de Beauchamp, Lady of Abergavenny.
- Joan de Beauchamp (1396 – 3 August 1430), married 28 August 1413 James Butler, 4th Earl of Ormond, son of James Butler, 3rd Earl of Ormond and Anne Welles, by whom she had five children, including Thomas Butler, 7th Earl of Ormond.

== Death ==
Joan, Baroness Bergavenny, died on 14 November 1435, at the age of 60. She was buried in Black Friars, Hereford beside her husband. She endowed a chantry to say prayers for her soul,

== Ancestry ==
Ancestors of Lady Joan FitzAlan

16. Richard FitzAlan, 8th Earl of Arundel
8. Edmund FitzAlan, 9th Earl of Arundel
17. Alice of Saluzzo
4. Richard FitzAlan, 10th Earl of Arundel
18. William de Warenne
9. Alice de Warenne
19. Joan de Vere
2. Richard FitzAlan, 11th Earl of Arundel
20. Edmund Crouchback, 1st Earl of Lancaster
10. Henry, 3rd Earl of Lancaster
21. Blanche of Artois
5. Eleanor of Lancaster
22. Sir Patrick de Chaworth, Lord of Kidwelly
11. Maud Chaworth
23. Isabella de Beauchamp
1. Joan FitzAlan
24. Humphrey de Bohun, 3rd Earl of Hereford
12. Humphrey de Bohun, 4th Earl of Hereford
25. Maud de Fiennes
6. William de Bohun, 1st Earl of Northampton
26. Edward I of England
13. Elizabeth of Rhuddlan
27. Eleanor of Castile
3. Elizabeth de Bohun
28. Gunselm de Badlesmere
14. Bartholomew de Badlesmere, 1st Baron Badlesmere
29. Joan FitzBernard
7. Elizabeth de Badlesmere
30. Thomas de Clare, Lord of Thomond
15. Margaret de Clare
31. Juliana FitzGerald
