= William Fitz Thomas =

Prior of the Knights Hospitaller

William Fitz Thomas (fl. 1415–1438) was Prior of the Hospitallers at Kilmainham from 1420 to 1438. He succeeded Thomas Le Boteller, who died on military service in France in 1420.

Even before he became Prior he was clearly a judge and statesman of some importance. In April 1422 the Council appointed him Lord Lieutenant of Ireland: he held that office until the following October. He also served twice as Lord Chancellor of Ireland; there is some confusion as to the dates of his terms of office, but he is first recorded as holding office as Chancellor in 1415, and stepped down after 1426. In 1417 he witnessed an important charter of King Henry V of England, guaranteeing the liberties of the citizens of Dublin.

Despite his high offices, he was to some extent under the control of the Archbishop of Armagh, in particular as regards his Order's substantial lands in County Louth. The formidable John Swayne, Archbishop of Armagh from 1418 to 1439, was quick to assert his authority: he ordered Fitz Thomas to remove a vicar who was guilty of adultery, and when another vicar resigned due to poverty, Swayne ordered Fitz Thomas to increase the stipend which went with the living, or forfeit the right to present his candidate as vicar. In both cases, Fitz Thomas seems to have felt obliged to comply with the Archbishop's orders. In 1427 he was forgiven all his debts owed to the Crown. He had ceased to be Prior by 1438.
