= Book of the White Earl =

- Bodleian Library
- Also known as: The Laud Genealogies and Tribal Histories
- Date: c. 1404–52
- Place of origin: Ireland: Pottlerath and elsewhere
- Language(s): Old and Middle Irish, Early Modern
- Patron: James Butler, 4th Earl of Ormond

Location of Pottlerath (Ráth an Photaire) in Ireland

The Book of the White Earl is an Irish religious and literary miscellany created circa 1404–1452.

The Book of the White Earl, now Bodleian Laud Misc. MS 610, consists of twelve folios inserted into Leabhar na Rátha, a.k.a. The Book of Pottlerath. It was created by Gaelic scribes under the patronage of James Butler, 4th Earl of Ormond (1392–1452). Henry and Marsh-Michel describe it as follows:

The sumptuous initials of this book are not more or less servile repetition of twelfth-century work ... the work of the scribe also is dazzling. He plays like a virtuoso with various sizes of script, the larger size having a majestic decorative quality. The contents are no less remarkable; the "Martyrology of Óengus", the "Acallam na Senórach" and a dindsenchus. The foliage pattern is probably inspired by foreign models, but is so completely integrated that the borrowing is only realised on second thoughts. The initials are large, bold, and drawn in firm lines and bright colours.

Butler is admired for having been strongly Gaelicised. He was an Irish-speaker and seems to have been the very first of the Anglo-Irish lords to appoint a brehon, Domhnall Mac Flannachadha, for his service. Butler granted Mac Flannchadha lands in Tipperary.

== Sources ==
- Manuscripts and illuminations 1169-1603, by Francoise Henry and Genevieve Louise Marsh-Micheli, in A New History of Ireland, pp. 801–803, volume two.
- Laud 610. The Laud Genealogies and Tribal Histories. UCC CELT project.
  - The Laud Synchronisms at UCC CELT project - primitive version of the List of High Kings of Ireland included in the MS.
