= Thomas Le Boteller =

Thomas Le Boteller, or Thomas Butler, nicknamed Thomas Bacach i.e. Thomas the Lame (before 1386 – 1420), was the illegitimate son of the 3rd Earl of Ormond, and a leading political figure in early fifteenth-century Ireland. He held the offices of Lord Chancellor of Ireland, Lord Deputy of Ireland and Prior of Kilmainham. In his own lifetime, he was a highly unpopular statesman, who was accused by his numerous enemies of treason. He is now chiefly remembered as a professional soldier, who was present at the Siege of Rouen in 1418–19. He had previously fought in the sanguinary conflict known as the Battle of Bloody Bank near Dublin in 1402.

== Family ==
He was the son of James Butler, 3rd Earl of Ormond, by an unknown mistress; he was not, as is sometimes said, the son of the Earl's first wife Anne Welles. His date of birth is uncertain, but since he saw combat in 1402, was Lord Deputy of Ireland in 1406 and Prior of Kilmainham by 1410, it must have been long before his first legitimate brother was born in 1392, and probably several years before his father's first marriage in 1386.

Thomas' Gaelic nickname Bacach, "the lame" indicates that he was crippled, but this disability did not stop him from pursuing a highly successful military career. It is said that he had a son named John Beagh Botiller, who was born before 1420 and died in Kilkenny, County Kilkenny, although this cannot be verified with certainty. Stories that he fathered numerous other out-of-wedlock children are probably without foundation.

== Career ==
He was appointed Prior of the Order of the Knights Hospitaller at Kilmainham sometime before 1410, and held office until his death in 1420. He was made Lord Chancellor of Ireland in 1412 but due to the pressure of his other duties, he usually acted through his deputy, Robert Sutton. He was made Lord Deputy of Ireland in the absence of Thomas of Lancaster, Duke of Clarence in 1406, in which office he exercised great political influence. O'Flanagan states that Parliament threw out a Bill to regulate the Irish Church on Le Boteller's sole objection. Such conduct naturally led to complaints of corruption and maladministration, and these complaints may explain the attack on him by his political opponents in 1411–12. At his urging Clarence confirmed the charter of Wexford, first granted in 1318.

== Bloody Bank ==
The Knights Hospitaller were a military order and Thomas was a military man, being praised as a soldier of "tried courage". In 1402 he led an army of 1400 men against the O'Byrne clan of Wicklow, who frequently raided Dublin, and was joined by a larger force made up of the Dublin city militia, under the command of John Drake, Lord Mayor of Dublin, in an encounter popularly known as the Battle of Bloody Bank. Half of Thomas' force deserted to the enemy and he was forced to withdraw in good order. Although accounts of the battle are confused, it seems clear that Drake rallied his men and defeated the O'Byrnes on the banks of the River Dargle near Bray, County Wicklow. killing at least 400 of them (or 40000 by one account). So much blood poured into the Dargle that the spot was known for centuries afterwards as Bloody Bank.

== Complaints about his regime ==
Boteller's rule as Lord Chancellor had by now become so unpopular that the Privy Council of Ireland sent an impressive deputation, including two archbishops, to England to complain about his misconduct, and he was summoned to London to answer the charges made against him. He appears to have simply ignored both the original summons and a second order to appear before the English Council. On the death of King Henry IV of England in 1413, the Lord Lieutenancy of his son the Duke of Clarence automatically lapsed, and Thomas' Deputyship lapsed with it.

== Boteller accused of treason ==
In 1417 and 1418 he was engaged in a private war with the Burkes in Tipperary and Kilkenny. This led to a clash with John Talbot, 1st Earl of Shrewsbury, the Lord Lieutenant of Ireland, who supported the Burkes, and whose feud with Thomas's legitimate half-brother James Butler, 4th Earl of Ormonde would dominate Irish politics for many years. Thomas was accused of treasonable correspondence with Gerald FitzGerald, 5th Earl of Kildare and Christopher Preston, 2nd Baron Gormanston, both of whom were briefly imprisoned. No action seems to have been taken against Thomas himself: he was repeatedly summoned to Parliament but, as in 1411-2, he simply refused to appear.In the event, his willingness to lead an army to France helped to resolve the crisis. Preston and Gormanston were soon released and restored to favour: Otway-Ruthven concludes that they are unlikely to have been engaged in a treasonable conspiracy, and were simply opposed to Shrewsbury's high-handed regime. Thomas was also accused of treasonable dealings with Irish clans hostile to the English Crown and of allowing them to lay waste lands in English territory. Again, nothing seems to have come of these changes.

== Siege of Rouen ==
In 1418–1419 Thomas led a force to fight with Henry V of England at the Siege of Rouen; French and English sources agree that he was present although they differ greatly on the size of his force. The best estimate of the number of Irish troops is about 700. According to one description, there were:

"eighteen score men with red shields and eighteen score with pure white shields; and not often has so numerous and well-born a host embarked from England".

He is said to have given good service to the English cause in France, and died there in 1420, still probably less than forty years old. William Fitz Thomas succeeded him as Prior.

== Character ==
O'Flanagan calls Thomas a man of great courage and considerable administrative ability, who overcame what were then the serious double drawbacks of illegitimacy and physical disability to become a successful soldier and statesman. Otway-Ruthven, on the other hand, while praising his military ability, regarded him as a quarrelsome and unsatisfactory character with a dubious record of loyalty to the Crown. Archdall calls him "a man of tried courage".
