= Battle of Piltown =

Battle in the War of the Roses

- Part of Wars of the Roses
| Date | Summer 1462 |
| Location | Piltown, Ireland |
| Result | Yorkist victory |

Belligerents
| House of York | House of Lancaster |

Commanders and leaders
| Earl of Desmond | Earl of Ormond |

Strength
| Unknown | Unknown |

Casualties and losses
| Unknown | 1,000+ |

The Battle of Piltown took place near Piltown, County Kilkenny in 1462 as part of the Wars of the Roses. It was fought between the supporters of the two leading Irish magnates Thomas FitzGerald, 7th Earl of Desmond, head of the government in Dublin and a committed Yorkist, and John Butler, 6th Earl of Ormond who backed the Lancastrian cause. It ended in decisive victory for Desmond and his Yorkists, with Ormond's army suffering more than a thousand casualties. This effectively ended Lancastrian hopes in Ireland and bolstered FitzGerald control for a further half-century. The Ormonds departed into exile, although they were later pardoned by Edward IV.

It was the only major battle to be fought in the Lordship of Ireland during the Wars of the Roses. It is also part of the long-running feud between the FitzGeralds and the Butlers.

== Bibliography ==
- Jeffrey James. Edward IV: Glorious Son of York. Amberley Publishing, 2015.
- Anthony M. McCormack. The Earldom of Desmond 1463-1583: The Decline and Crisis of a Feudal Lordship. Four Courts Press, 2005.
