= Black Monday (1360) =

Hail storm during the Hundred Years' War

- Part of the Hundred Years' War
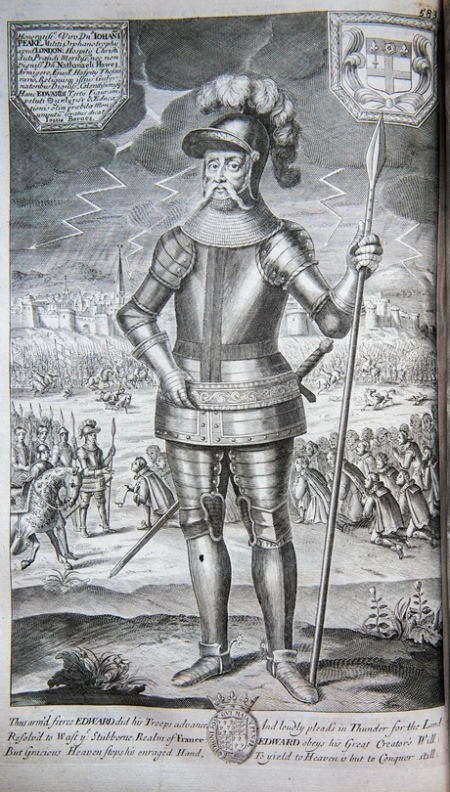
- The History of that Most Victorious Monarch Edward III by Joshua Barnes
Date	13–14 April 1360 (1 day)
Location	Outskirts of Chartres, France
Result	English defeat

Belligerents
England	France

Commanders and leaders
King Edward III; Edward, the Black Prince; Walter Manny; Duke of Lancaster; Earl of Warwick; Guy de Beauchamp †	Androuin de La Roche

Strength
10,000: 4,000 men-at-arms; 700 continental mercenaries; 5,000 mounted archers	Low

Casualties and losses
1,000 dead	None/Unknown

Black Monday took place on Easter Monday 1360, near the end of the Edwardian phase of the Hundred Years' War, when a freak hail storm struck and killed an estimated 1,000 English soldiers. The storm was so devastating that it caused more English casualties than any of the previous battles of the war.

== Background at Paris ==
On 5 April 1360, Edward III, King of England led his army of 10,000 men (including approximately 4,000 men-at-arms, 700 continental mercenaries, 5,000 mounted archers) to the gates of Paris, in one of the largest English armies fielded in the Hundred Years' War. The force was headed by the King's most trusted lieutenants, including the Prince of Wales; Henry, duke of Lancaster; the earls of Northampton and Warwick; and Sir Walter Mauny; all men who had been responsible for many of the English military successes in the preceding two decades. The defenders of Paris led by Charles, Dauphin of France, refused battle. It was not possible to breach the defenses so over the next week Edward would try to induce the Dauphin into open battle. All attempts at the latter would prove futile and undermine Edward's hope for a decisive outcome. The English left the vicinity of Paris after laying waste to the countryside, and marched towards the French cathedral city of Chartres.

== Siege of Chartres ==
On Easter Monday, 13 April, Edward's army arrived at the gates of Chartres. The French defenders again refused battle, instead sheltering behind their fortifications, and a siege ensued. The French defence was low in numbers and led by the Abbot of Cluny, Androuin de La Roche.

That night, the English army made camp outside Chartres in an open plain. A sudden storm materialized and lightning struck, killing several people. The temperature fell dramatically and huge hailstones – along with freezing rain – began pelting the soldiers, scattering the horses. Two of the English leaders were killed, and panic set in among the troops, who had little to no shelter from the storm. One described it as "a foul day, full of myst and hayle, so that men dyed on horseback [sic]. Tents were torn apart by the fierce wind and baggage trains were strewn around. In half an hour, the precipitation and intense cold killed nearly 1,000 Englishmen and up to 6,000 horses. Among the injured English leaders was Sir Guy de Beauchamp II, the eldest son of Thomas de Beauchamp, the 11th Earl of Warwick; he would die of his injuries two weeks after.

Edward was convinced the phenomenon was a sign from God against his endeavours. During the climax of the storm he is said to have dismounted from his horse and knelt in the direction of the Cathedral of Our Lady of Chartres. He recited a vow of peace and was convinced to negotiate with the French.

Shortly after the freak storm, the next day, Androuin de La Roche arrived at the English camp with peace proposals. Edward agreed with the counsel of his trusted aide Henry of Grosmont, the 1st Duke of Lancaster. That day Edward began the withdrawal of his army from the gates of Chartres, effectively ending the one-day siege of the town.

== Aftermath ==
French friar Jean de Venette credited the apocalyptic storm as the result of the English looting of the French countryside during the observant week of Lent.

On 8 May 1360, three weeks later, the Treaty of Brétigny was signed, marking the end of the first phase of the Hundred Years' War.

The legacy was mentioned by Shakespeare:

It was not for nothing that my nose fell a-bleeding on Black Monday last, at six o'clock i' th' morning.

— William Shakespeare, The Merchant of Venice, ii. 5.

== See also ==
- Qingyang event
