= John Alleyn (mercer) =

English merchant and politician

Sir John Alleyn (sometimes Alleyne; died 1544) was an English merchant and politician who served two terms as Lord Mayor of London.

== Family ==
John Alleyn was the eldest son of Richard Alleyn of Thaxted. He had two brothers, Christopher and John; it was not unknown at this time for families to have two sons with the same given name. His brothers both married daughters (and co-heirs) of Giles Leigh of Walton Leigh.

== Career ==
Alleyn became a successful mercer in London, where he was elected as one of the Sheriffs of London in 1518. He was elected to his first term as Lord Mayor in 1525, and to a second term in 1535. He was later chosen to join the Privy Council of King Henry VIII. He was one of the principal benefactors of the 16th-century rebuilding of the Hospital of St Thomas of Acre, where he was later interred. He also left a rich golden collar to be worn by Lord Mayors of London.

== Death and legacy ==
Alleyn died in 1544 and was buried at a chapel which he had built in St Thomas Acres. He had no legitimate children, but he did have two illegitimate sons and one daughter. The elder son, Christopher Alleyn, inherited sufficient wealth to secure his status in society, becoming a Member of Parliament and marrying a daughter of William Paget, 1st Baron Paget. Part of Alleyn's estate went to his brother John Alleyn, junior, ancestor of the Alleyn baronets.
