= Alice Cherleton, Baroness Cherleton =

English noblewoman

Alice Cherleton
- Baroness Cherleton
- Born: 1378; Arundel Castle, Sussex, England
- Died: 1415 (aged 36–37)
- Noble family: FitzAlan (by birth); Cherleton (by marriage)
- Spouse: John Charleton, 4th Baron Cherleton
- Issue: Jane Beaufort (allegedly by Cardinal Henry Beaufort)
- Father: Richard Fitzalan, 11th Earl of Arundel
- Mother: Elizabeth de Bohun

Alice Cherleton, Baroness Cherleton (née Fitzalan; 1378–1415) was an English noblewoman, being the daughter of Richard FitzAlan, 11th Earl of Arundel. She was the wife of John Charleton, 4th Baron Cherleton.

== Family ==
Lady Alice was born in Arundel Castle, Sussex in 1378, one of the seven children of Richard Fitzalan, 11th Earl of Arundel by his first wife Elizabeth de Bohun. She had two brothers, including Thomas Fitzalan, 12th Earl of Arundel, and four sisters, Lady Eleanor FitzAlan, Lady Elizabeth FitzAlan, Lady Joan FitzAlan, and Lady Margaret FitzAlan. Her paternal grandparents were Richard Fitzalan, 10th Earl of Arundel and Eleanor of Lancaster, and her maternal grandparents were William de Bohun, 1st Earl of Northampton and Elizabeth de Badlesmere.

On 21 September 1397, her father was executed at Tower Hill, Cheapside for high treason against King Richard II of England.

== Marriage and love affair ==
Sometime before March 1392 Alice married John Cherleton, 4th Lord Cherleton (25 April 1362 – 19 October 1401). According to popular belief, following her marriage she became the mistress of Cardinal Henry Beaufort, and bore him an illegitimate daughter, Jane Beaufort. In Philip Yorke's The Royal Tribes of Wales, he states that "Cardinal Beaufort left an illegitimate daughter by Alice, daughter of Fitzalan, Earl of Arundel".

Genealogist Douglas Richardson also mentions the alleged affair between Alice and the Cardinal. According to Richardson, there is "no contemporary evidence that Alice was either the mistress of Henry Beaufort, or that she was the mother of his illegitimate daughter, Joan, born say 1390." Furthermore, the earliest appearance of the claim that Alice was the girl's mother is in The Winning of the Lordship of Glamorgan, written by a later Sir Edward Stradling, a descendant, between 1561 and 1566. Henry Beaufort did indeed father an illegitimate daughter, Joan Beaufort, possibly before he took holy orders on 7 April 1397.

Joan and Sir Edward Stradling had three sons and a daughter, Katherine. Alice's husband died on 19 October 1401, and she herself died before October 1415 around the age of 37.

== Sources ==
- Philip Yorke, The Royal Tribes of Wales Google Books; accessed 30 August 2009.
