= Guy de Beauchamp II =

Sir Guy de Beauchamp
- Heir to the Earl of Warwick
- Coat of Arms of Beauchamp
- Born: c. 1337
- Died: 28 April 1360
- Buried: Vendôme, Loir-Et-Cher, France
- Spouse: Philippa de Ferrers
- Issue: Elizabeth (died c. 1369); Katherine
- Father: Thomas de Beauchamp, 11th Earl of Warwick
- Mother: Katherine Mortimer, Countess of Warwick
- Occupation: Military commander
- Cause of death: Hail

Sir Guy de Beauchamp (born c. 1335 - died 28 April 1360), Knight, was an English nobleman and heir apparent to the title of Earl of Warwick, being the eldest son of the 11th Earl of Warwick. He served as a military commander in the army of Edward III in France, where he was mortally injured in a freak hailstorm during the Siege of Chartres on 13 April. He died three weeks later on 28 April 1360.

== Life ==
Born 1335, Guy was the son of Thomas de Beauchamp, 11th Earl of Warwick and Katherine Mortimer, Countess of Warwick. He was knighted with his brother, Thomas, in July 1355, when the King was with the fleet in the Downs on the way to an invasion of France. For his good service, he was granted an annual pension of L100 on 27 November 1355.

== Marriage and issue ==
Guy de Beauchamp married Philippa de Ferrers before 1353: daughter of Henry de Ferrers, 2nd Lord Ferrers of Groby, and Isabel de Verdun. His widow Philippa died 5 August 1384, and was buried at Necton, Norfolk. He left a will dated 26 September 1359.

They had:

- Elizabeth (born c. 1367 - died c. 1369)
- Katherine, nun at Shouldham.

His daughters were, by entail, excluded from their grandfather's inheritance.

== Sources ==
- Blanton, Virginia (2010). Signs of Devotion: The Cult of St. Æthelthryth in Medieval England, 695-1615. Pennsylvania State University Press.
- Given-Wilson, Chris (2002). The English Nobility in the Late Middle Ages: The Fourteenth-Century Political Community. Routledge.
