= James Butler, 2nd Earl of Ormond =

Irish peer and Lord Justice of Ireland (1331-1382)

James Butler, 2nd Earl of Ormond (4 October 1331 – 18 October 1382) was a noble in the Peerage of Ireland. He was Lord Justice of Ireland in 1359, 1364, and 1376, and a dominant political leader in Ireland in the 1360s and 1370s.

The son of James Butler, 1st Earl of Ormond and Lady Eleanor de Bohun, James was born at Kilkenny Castle and given in ward on 1 September 1344 to Maurice FitzGerald, 1st Earl of Desmond for the fine of 2,306 marks; and afterwards to Sir John Darcy who married him to his daughter Elizabeth. He was usually called The Noble Earl, being a great-grandson, through his mother, of King Edward I of England. He died at Knocktopher Castle in Kilkenny, Leinster, Ireland.

== Career ==
In 1362, he slew 600 of Mac Murrough's followers at Teigstaffen (County Kilkenny). On 22 April 1364, was appointed Lord Deputy of Ireland to Lionel of Antwerp, Duke of Clarence: Clarence, from his first arrival in Ireland, placed great trust in him, and for a few years it seems that as Deputy he was almost all-powerful. In the 1360s he clashed with Maurice FitzGerald, 4th Earl of Kildare. In 1364 the Irish House of Commons sent a delegation to England, headed by Kildare, to complain of misgovernment, and to ask for the removal of "corrupt" officials, some of whom had links to Ormond. A number of these officials were removed, but Ormond's position was not seriously threatened.

He was Lord Justice by 24 July 1376, with a salary of £500 a year, in which office he was continued by King Richard II of England. On 2 April 1372, he was made constable of Dublin Castle, with the fee of £18 5s. a year. He was summoned to the Parliaments held by Richard II.

He died on 18 October 1382 in his castle of Knocktopher (near which he had, in 1356, founded a Friary for Carmelite friars). He was buried in St. Canice's Cathedral, Kilkenny.

== Marriage and Children ==
On 15 May 1346, he married Elizabeth Darcy, daughter of Sir John Darcy, Knight of Knaith (another Lord Justice of Ireland) and Joan de Burgh. They had five children:

- James Butler, 3rd Earl of Ormond (1362–1405).
- Thomas Butler, Justice of Cork 1359–1396
- Eleanor Butler 1350–1392, married Gerald FitzGerald, 3rd Earl of Desmond
- Joan Butler 1360–1393 (plague) married Teige O'Carroll, Prince of Éile
- Ralph Butler 1356–1367

== See also ==
- Butler dynasty

Peerage of Ireland
Preceded by James Butler	Earl of Ormond; 1337–1382	Succeeded by James Butler
