= Richard Fitzalan, 4th Earl of Arundel =

4th Earl Arundel (1346–1397)

Richard Fitzalan
- 4th Earl of Arundel; 9th Earl of Surrey
- Born: 1346
- Died: 21 September 1397 (aged 50–51); London, England
- Noble family: FitzAlan
- Spouses: Elizabeth de Bohun; Lady Philippa Mortimer
- Issue: Thomas Fitzalan; Elizabeth FitzAlan; Joan FitzAlan; Margaret Fitzalan; Alice Fitzalan; William Fitzalan
- Father: Richard Fitzalan
- Mother: Eleanor of Lancaster

Richard Fitzalan, 4th Earl of Arundel, 9th Earl of Surrey (1346 – 21 September 1397) was an English medieval nobleman and military commander.

== Lineage ==
Born in 1346, he was the son of Richard Fitzalan, 3rd Earl of Arundel and Eleanor of Lancaster. He succeeded his father to the title of Earl of Arundel on 24 January 1376.

His brother was Thomas Arundel, the Bishop of Ely from 1374 to 1388, Archbishop of York from 1388 to 1397, and Archbishop of Canterbury in 1397 and from 1399 until his death in 1414.

At the coronation of Richard II, Richard Fitzalan carried the crown.

== Admiral ==
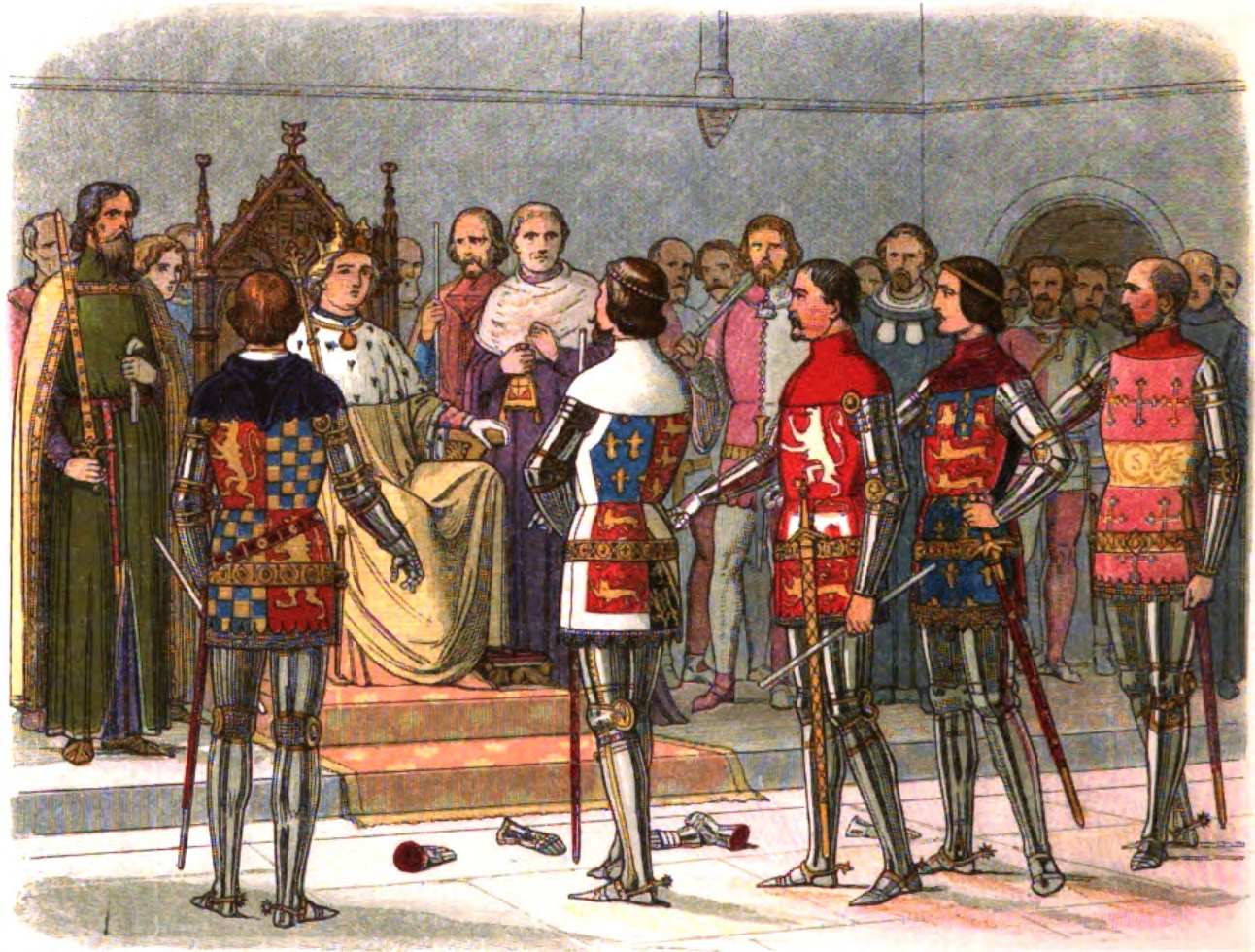
Arundel, Gloucester, Nottingham, Derby and Warwick demanding Richard II to let them prove by arms the justice for their rebellion

In 1377, Richard Fitzalan held the title of Admiral of the North and West. In this capacity, he attacked Harfleur on 22 May 1378, but was forced to return to his ships by the defenders. Later, he and John of Gaunt attempted to seize Saint-Malo but were unsuccessful.

=== Power struggle ===
Fitzalan was closely aligned with Thomas, Duke of Gloucester, who was an uncle of King Richard II. Thomas was opposed to Richard II's desire for peace with France in the Hundred Years' War and a power struggle ensued between him and Gloucester. In late 1386, Gloucester forced King Richard II to name himself and Richard Fitzalan to the King's Council. This Council was to all intents and purposes a Regency Council for Richard II. However, King Richard limited the duration of the Council's powers to one year.

=== Knight of the Garter ===
In 1386, King Richard II named Richard Fitzalan Admiral of England and made him a Knight of the Garter. As Admiral of England, he defeated at the Battle of Margate a Franco-Spanish-Flemish fleet off Margate in March 1387, along with Thomas de Mowbray, Earl of Nottingham.

== New favourites ==
In August 1387, the King dismissed Gloucester and Fitzalan from the Council and replaced them with his favourites—including the Archbishop of York, Alexander Neville; the Duke of Ireland, Robert de Vere; Michael de la Pole, the Earl of Suffolk; Sir Robert Tresilian, who was the Chief Justice; and the former Mayor of London Nicholas Brembre.

== Radcot Bridge ==
The King summoned Gloucester and Fitzalan to a meeting. However, instead of coming, they raised troops and defeated the new Council at Radcot Bridge on 22 December 1387. During that battle, they took the favourites prisoner. The next year, the Merciless Parliament condemned the favourites.

Fitzalan was one of the Lords Appellant who accused and condemned Richard II's favourites. He made himself particularly odious to the King by refusing, along with Gloucester, to spare the life of Sir Simon de Burley who had been condemned by the Merciless Parliament. This was even after the queen, Anne of Bohemia, went down on her knees before them to beg for mercy. King Richard never forgave this humiliation and planned and waited for his moment of revenge.

Arundel was named Governor of Brest in 1388.

=== Opposed to peace ===
Peace was concluded with France in 1389. However, Richard Fitzalan followed Gloucester's lead and stated that he would never agree with the peace that had been concluded.

== Marriage and children ==
Arundel married twice.

His first wife was Elizabeth de Bohun, daughter of William de Bohun, 1st Earl of Northampton and Elizabeth de Badlesmere. They married around 28 September 1359 and had seven children:

- Lady Eleanor Fitzalan (c. 1365 – 1375), on 28 October 1371, at the age of about six, married Robert de Ufford. Died childless.
- Elizabeth Fitzalan (c. 1366 – 8 July 1425), married first William Montacute (before December 1378); no issue. Married second, in 1384, Thomas Mowbray, 1st Duke of Norfolk; had issue. Married third, before August 1401, Sir Robert Goushill of Hoveringham; had issue. Married fourth, before 1411, Sir Gerard Usflete, son of Sir Gerard Usflete (d.1406), MP, without issue.
- Joan FitzAlan (1375 – 14 November 1435), who married William Beauchamp, 1st Baron Bergavenny. They had a son, Richard de Beauchamp, 1st Earl of Worcester and a daughter Joan de Beauchamp, wife of James Butler, 4th Earl of Ormonde.
- Alice Fitzalan (1378 – before October 1415), married before March 1392, John Charleton, 4th Baron Cherleton. (not mentioned as an heir of Thomas in the Complete Peerage). Had an affair with Cardinal Henry Beaufort, by whom she had an illegitimate daughter, Jane Beaufort.
- Thomas Fitzalan, 5th Earl of Arundel, (1381–1415) married 26 November 1405, Beatrice, Countess of Arundel, illegitimate daughter of King John I of Portugal and Inês Pires, members of the Royal House of Aviz.
- Margaret Fitzalan, who married Sir Rowland Lenthall; by whom she had two sons.
- William (or Richard) Fitzalan

After the death of his first wife in 1385, Arundel married Philippa Mortimer, daughter of Edmund Mortimer, 3rd Earl of March. Her mother was Philippa Plantagenet, the only daughter of Lionel of Antwerp and thus a granddaughter of Edward III. They had one child together, a short-lived son named John FitzAlan (b. ca 1394, d. ca 1397). (Alison Weir, Britain's Royal Families, page 98).

== Death and succession ==
By 1394, Arundel was again a member of the royal council, and was involved in a quarrel with John of Gaunt, whom he accused in the parliament of that year. Fitzalan further antagonized the King by arriving late for the queen's funeral. Richard II, in a rage, snatched a wand and struck Fitzalan in the face and drew blood. Shortly after that, the King feigned a reconciliation but he was only biding his time for the right moment to strike.

Arundel was persuaded by his brother Thomas to surrender himself and to trust the king's clemency. On 12 July 1397, Richard Fitzalan was arrested for his opposition to Richard II, as well as plotting with Gloucester to imprison the king. He stood trial at Westminster and was attainted. He was beheaded on 21 September 1397 and was buried in the church of the Augustin Friars, near Old Broad Street, London. Tradition holds that his final words were said to the executioner, "Torment me not long, strike off my head in one blow".

In October 1400, the attainder was reversed, and Richard Fitzalan's son Thomas succeeded to his father's estates and honours.

== Notes ==
=== Secondary sources ===
- Cokayne, George E. (2000). The Complete Peerage of Great Britain and Ireland. Microprint Edition Gloucester: Sutton Publishing. ISBN 0-904387-82-8.
  - "Some proposed Corrections to the Complete Peerage".
- Powell, J. Enoch; Wallis, Keith (1968). The House of Lords in the Middle Ages: A History of the English House of Lords to 1540. London: Weidenfeld and Nicolson. ISBN 0-297-76105-6.
- Seward, Desmond (1982). The Hundred Years War: The English in France, 1337-1453. New York: Atheneum. ISBN 0-689-70628-6.

Peerage of England
Preceded by Richard Fitzalan	Earl of Arundel (2nd creation); 1376–1397	Succeeded by Forfeit later reversed for Thomas Fitzalan
Preceded by Richard Fitzalan	Earl of Surrey (1st creation); 1376–1397	Succeeded by Forfeit later reversed for Thomas Fitzalan
