= Richard Beauchamp, 1st Earl of Worcester =

English noble (c.1394–1422)

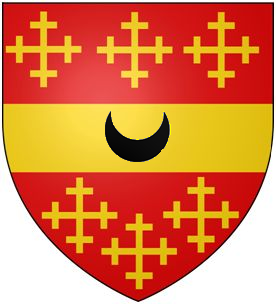
Arms of Richard de Beauchamp, Earl of Worcester (died 1422): Gules, a fesse between six crosses crosslet or a crescent sable for difference. These are the Beauchamp arms differenced by a crescent for a second son, to distinguish them from those of the senior line, the Earls of Warwick

Richard de Beauchamp, Earl of Worcester, KB (c. 1394 – c. 18 March 1421/1422) was an English peer.

The only son of William de Beauchamp, 1st Baron Bergavenny and Joan de Beauchamp, Baroness Bergavenny. William Beauchamp was the fourth son of the Earl of Warwick, and he had purchased the marcher lordship of Bergavenny from the Hastings family shortly before it died out in the male line. Joan FitzAlan was a daughter of Richard FitzAlan, 11th Earl of Arundel, who was executed by Richard II shortly before the latter's deposition. Joan was married to William in 1392 when she was 17 and he 55. There were certainly political dimensions as both families had been involved in the Lords Appellant and were also major landowners in the West Midlands and the Welsh Marches.

Documentation about Richard Beauchamp's life, particularly his young life, is scarce. His father died when he was 17, but he was outlived by his mother. Due to a conveyance executed by his parents and their lawyers, a few years before his father's death, the Bergavenny entail was temporarily broken. Joan Beauchamp would enjoy by jointure and survivorship rights for life to the entirety of the lordship of Bergavenny; the lordship, castle, manor, town and all lands attached to the lordship were hers for life, rather than passing to his son in full or 2/3 during his mother's life.

During her widowhood (1411–1435), Richard's mother Joan enjoyed ownership of the lordship, castle, manor, town, appurtenances and attached lands, acquired an armed, liveried following and actively sought to expand her holdings. In legal documents, she was referred to as "Domina de Bergavenny" ("domina" being Latin feminine for "lord" or "dominus" and thus carrying a stronger connotation than "lady" in English which typically implied a style, not a title"). After his majority in 1416, Richard was never summoned to parliament as the lord of Bergavenny although his father had been, and his descendants would.

On 27 July 1411, he married Lady Isabel le Despenser, daughter of Thomas le Despenser, 1st Earl of Gloucester, and great-granddaughter of Edward III. They had one child, Lady Elizabeth de Beauchamp, later 3rd Baroness Bergavenny, who married Sir Edward Neville, later 1st Baron Bergavenny. He was joint Warden of the Welsh Marches in 1415, and a captain of lances and archers in Normandy in 1418. In February 1420/1, he was created Earl of Worcester.

Worcester was mortally wounded on 18 March 1421/2 at the Siege of Meaux and died soon after. His body was taken back to England and he was buried on 25 April 1422 at Tewkesbury, Gloucestershire. His daughter inherited his estates, although she didn't inherit Bergavenny until her grandmother, whose sole heir she was, died in 1435

== Ancestry ==
Ancestors of Richard Beauchamp, 1st Earl of Worcester

16. William de Beauchamp, 9th Earl of Warwick
8. Guy de Beauchamp, 10th Earl of Warwick
17. Maud FitzJohn
4. Thomas de Beauchamp, 11th Earl of Warwick
18. Ralph VII de Toeni, Lord Toeni of Flamsted
9. Alice de Toeni
19. Mary ??
2. William de Beauchamp, 1st Baron Bergavenny
20. Edmund Mortimer, 2nd Baron Mortimer
10. Roger Mortimer, 1st Earl of March
21. Margaret de Fiennes
5. Katherine Mortimer
22. Sir Piers de Genevelle
11. Joan de Geneville, 2nd Baroness Geneville
23. Jeanne of Lusignan
1. Richard de Beauchamp, Earl of Worcester
24. Edmund FitzAlan, 9th Earl of Arundel
12. Richard FitzAlan, 10th Earl of Arundel
25. Alice de Warenne
6. Richard FitzAlan, 11th Earl of Arundel
26. Henry, 3rd Earl of Lancaster
13. Eleanor of Lancaster
27. Maud Chaworth
3. Joan FitzAlan
28. Humphrey de Bohun, 4th Earl of Hereford
14. William de Bohun, 1st Earl of Northampton
29. Elizabeth of Rhuddlan
7. Elizabeth de Bohun
30. Bartholomew de Badlesmere, 1st Baron Badlesmere
15. Elizabeth de Badlesmere
31. Margaret de Clare

Peerage of England
New creation	Earl of Worcester; 1421–1422	Extinct
Preceded by William de Beauchamp	Baron Bergavenny; 1411–1422	Succeeded by Elizabeth Nevill
