= Anelida and Arcite =

Poem written by Geoffrey Chaucer

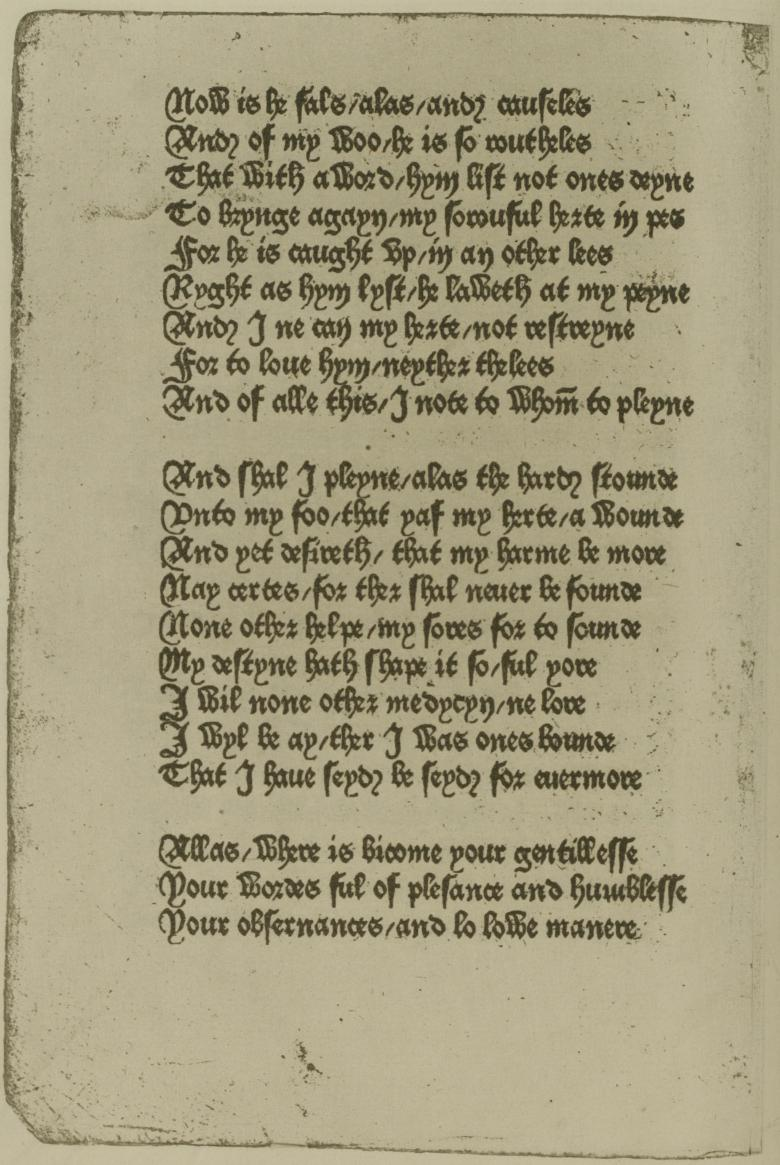
A page from William Caxton's edition of Anelida and Arcite, dated 1477

Anelida and Arcite is a 357-line English poem by Geoffrey Chaucer. It tells the story of Anelida, queen of Armenia and her wooing by false Arcite from Thebes, Greece.

Although relatively short, it is a poem with a complex structure, with an invocation and then the main story. The story is made up of an introduction and a complaint by Anelida which is in turn made up of a proem, a strophe, antistrophe and a conclusion. After the complaint there are a few lines which continue the story, but these may have been added by a later scribe. Like many of Chaucer's works it ends abruptly, and may be unfinished. The date of the poem's composition is not known but it is often placed in the late 1370s. The poem is never mentioned by Chaucer himself but scholars do not usually doubt his authorship. It is attributed to him in three manuscripts and by the poet John Lydgate.

The poem uses some of elements of the Teseida of Boccaccio, and the Thebaid of the Roman poet Statius, works which Chaucer would use again as a basis for The Knight's Tale. This influence of Italian literature is a point of transition from Chaucer's earlier works which were mainly influenced by French poetry. The poem itself is a rather ungainly mixture of the two traditions, with an epic invocation typical of Italian poetry giving way to a much less epic story, more French in character. Despite these jarring styles, the part of the work which forms Anelida's complaint is one of the most highly regarded uses of the "lover's-complaint" motif. Chaucer wrote several other short poems in the complaint genre such as The Complaint unto Pity and The Complaint of Venus, and this may have been an unsuccessful attempt on Chaucer's part to extend the form into a much longer poem.
