= John Butler, 6th Earl of Ormond =

Irish nobleman

- Born: 1422; Kilkenny, Ireland
- Died: 14 December 1476 (aged 53–54); Palestine
- Spouse: Reynalda O'Brien (mistress)
- Issue: Sir James Ormond; John Ormond; Edward Ormond
- Father: James Butler, 4th Earl of Ormond
- Mother: Joan de Beauchamp

John Butler, 6th Earl of Ormond (died 14 December 1476) was considered one of the first gentlemen of the age in which he lived. He was an ambassador to the most important courts of Europe.

== Family ==
John Butler, 6th Earl of Ormond was the second son of James Butler, 4th Earl of Ormond, by his first wife, Joan de Beauchamp (d. 3 or 5 August 1430). He had an elder brother, James Butler, 5th Earl of Ormond, and a younger brother, Thomas Butler, 7th Earl of Ormond, as well as two sisters, Elizabeth Butler, who married John Talbot, 2nd Earl of Shrewsbury, and Anne Butler (d. 4 January 1435), who was contracted to marry Thomas FitzGerald, 7th Earl of Desmond, although the marriage appears not to have taken place.

== Career ==
=== War of the Roses ===
A supporter of the Lancastrian cause, he was present at the Battle of Towton in 1461 where his elder brother was killed. He succeeded his brother to the title, but was forced to go on the run after this heavy defeat. Taking shelter in either Cumbria or Scotland he then crossed over to Ireland where there was still considerable support for his cause in Tipperary and Kilkenny. After raising a force amongst them he was confronted by the pro-Yorkist head of the Dublin government, Thomas Fitzgerald, Earl of Desmond. The two clashed at the Battle of Piltown in 1462, which ended in a decisive Yorkist victory. Ormond's army suffered over a thousand casualties.

He was subsequently restored to the earldom by Edward IV after having been attainted for his part in the battle of Towton. Edward IV is reported to have said that "if good breeding and liberal qualities were lost in the world, they might be all found in the Earl of Ormond". He was a complete master of the languages of Europe, and was sent as ambassador to its principal courts.

== Marriage and children ==
Ellis says that 'according to family tradition, Ormond died unmarried in the Holy Land, on pilgrimage, before 15 June 1477, possibly on 14 December 1476'. By his mistress Reynalda O'Brien, daughter of Turlogh "The Brown" O'Brien, King of Thomond, he had three illegitimate sons:

- Sir James Ormond (1462–1497). Heir designate to the Earldom of Ormonde, murdered by the illegitimate Piers "Black Sheep" Butler.
- John Ormond (1462 – 5 October 1503), who married the heiress Joan Chaworth (d.1507), by whom he had three daughters.
- Edward Ormond, (b.1450)

He was succeeded by his younger brother, Thomas Butler, 7th Earl of Ormond.

== See also ==
- Butler dynasty

== Notes ==
Peerage of Ireland
Preceded by James Butler	Earl of Ormond; 1461–1478	Succeeded by Thomas Butler
