= Hospital of St Thomas of Acre =

Coordinates: 51.5139°N 0.0919°W

Hospital of St. Thomas of Acre
- Hospital of St. Thomas of Acre
- Location: City of London
- Country: England
- Denomination: Roman Catholic

History
- Founded: 1227

The Hospital of St Thomas of Acre, in the City of London, was the medieval London headquarters of the Knights of Saint Thomas, founded as a church in 1227 in the parish of St Mary Colechurch, birthplace of the order's patron saint, Saint Thomas Becket. From the 14th century, it was the main headquarters of the military order.

In 1512, the Worshipful Company of Mercers bought from the order a site by the church on which to build its hall. In 1514, it formally became the order's patron.

In 1538, during the Protestant Reformation, the order was dissolved. The properties were forfeited to the crown and subsequently acquired by the Mercers in exchange for various payments, rents, and undertakings.

== Burials ==
- John Alleyn
- Joan Butler, Countess of Ormond, in the Mercers' Chapel
- Thomas Butler, 7th Earl of Ormond, in the Mercers' Chapel

== Notes ==
- The church of St. Thomas Acre at British History Online
