= Joan Butler, Countess of Ormond =

First wife of James Butler, 4th Earl of Ormond (1396–1430)

Joan Butler
- Countess of Ormond
- Born: 1396
- Died: 3 or 5 August 1430 (aged 33–34)
- Buried: Mercers' Chapel, St Thomas of Acre, London
- Noble family: Beauchamp
- Spouse: James Butler, 4th Earl of Ormond
- Issue: James Butler, 5th Earl of Ormond; John Butler, 6th Earl of Ormond; Thomas Butler, 7th Earl of Ormond; Elizabeth Butler, Countess of Shrewsbury; Anne Butler
- Father: William de Beauchamp, 1st Baron Bergavenny
- Mother: Lady Joan FitzAlan

Joan Butler (née Beauchamp), Countess of Ormond (1396 – 3 or 5 August 1430) was the first wife of James Butler, 4th Earl of Ormond, and the mother of his five children. Their principal residence was Kilkenny Castle in Ireland.

== Life ==
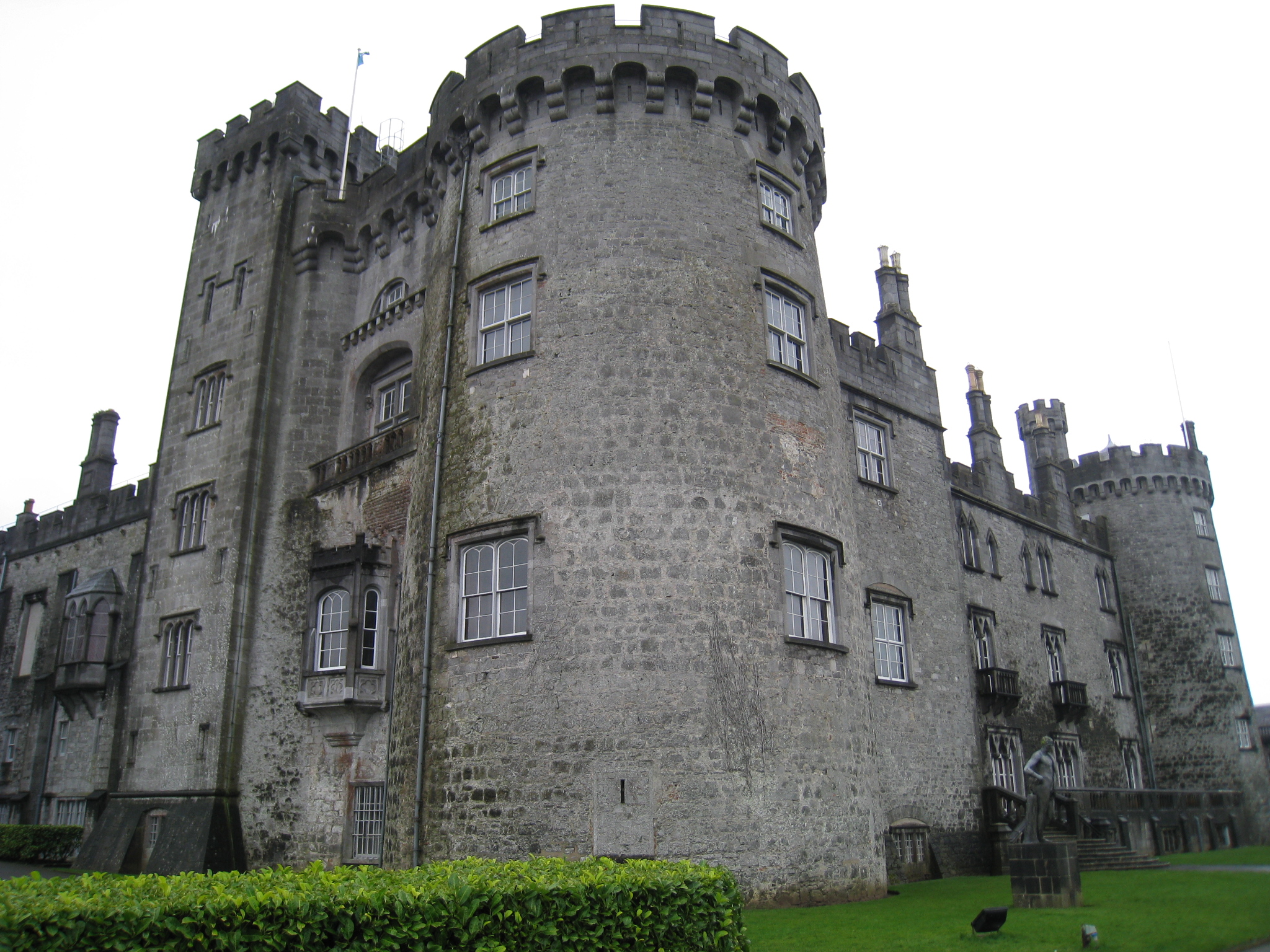
Kilkenny Castle, the principal residence of Joan de Beauchamp and James Butler, 4th Earl of Ormond

Joan de Beauchamp was the daughter of William de Beauchamp, 1st Baron Bergavenny, and his first wife, Lady Joan FitzAlan. She had a brother and sister:

- Richard de Beauchamp, 1st Earl of Worcester, 2nd Baron Bergavenny (c. 1397 – 18 March 1422), who married Lady Isabel le Despenser (27 July 1400 – 26 or 27 December 1439), by whom he had one daughter, Elizabeth de Beauchamp, Baroness Bergavenny.
- Elizabeth de Beauchamp.

Joan's paternal grandparents were Thomas de Beauchamp, 11th Earl of Warwick and Lady Katherine Mortimer, and her maternal grandparents were Richard FitzAlan, 11th Earl of Arundel and Elizabeth de Bohun.

Joan de Beauchamp died 3 or 5 August 1430, and was buried in the Mercers' Chapel, St Thomas of Acre, London.

== Marriage and issue ==
She married, before 28 August 1413, James Butler, 4th Earl of Ormond, by whom she had three sons and two daughters:

- James Butler, 5th Earl of Ormond, who died without legitimate issue.
- John Butler, 6th Earl of Ormond, who died without legitimate issue.
- Thomas Butler, 7th Earl of Ormond, whose daughter Margaret was a grandmother of Anne Boleyn.
- Elizabeth Butler, who married John Talbot, 2nd Earl of Shrewsbury and had issue.
- Anne Butler, who died unmarried.

== Ancestry ==
Ancestors of Joan Butler, Countess of Ormond

16. William de Beauchamp, 9th Earl of Warwick
8. Guy de Beauchamp, 10th Earl of Warwick
17. Maud FitzJohn
4. Thomas de Beauchamp, 11th Earl of Warwick
18. Ralph VII de Toeni, Lord Toeni of Flamsted
9. Alice de Toeni
19. Mary ??
2. William de Beauchamp, 1st Baron Bergavenny
20. Edmund Mortimer, 2nd Baron Mortimer
10. Roger Mortimer, 1st Earl of March
21. Margaret de Fiennes
5. Lady Katherine Mortimer
22. Sir Piers de Genevelle
11. Joan de Geneville, 2nd Baroness Geneville
23. Jeanne of Lusignan
1. Joan de Beauchamp, Countess of Ormond
24. Edmund FitzAlan, 9th Earl of Arundel
12. Richard FitzAlan, 10th Earl of Arundel
25. Alice de Warenne
6. Richard FitzAlan, 11th Earl of Arundel
26. Henry, 3rd Earl of Lancaster
13. Eleanor of Lancaster
27. Maud Chaworth
3. Lady Joan FitzAlan
28. Humphrey de Bohun, 4th Earl of Hereford
14. William de Bohun, 1st Earl of Northampton
29. Elizabeth of Rhuddlan
7. Lady Elizabeth de Bohun
30. Bartholomew de Badlesmere, 1st Baron Badlesmere
15. Elizabeth de Badlesmere
31. Margaret de Clare
