= Thomas Butler, 7th Earl of Ormond =

Irish earl and peer (1426–1515)

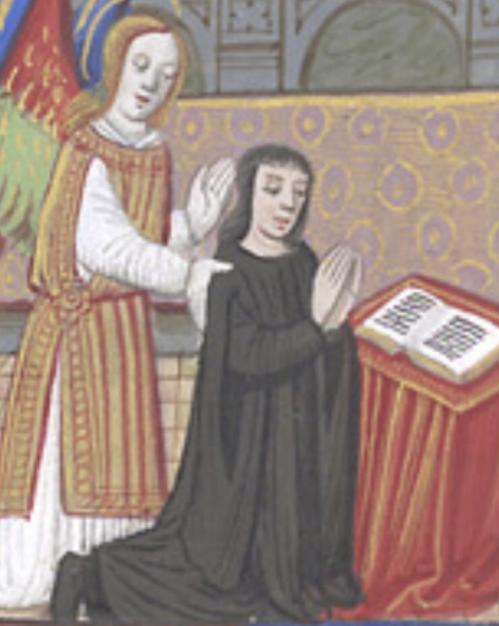
- Kneeling man from the Butler book of hours thought to be Thomas.
- Born: 1426; Kilkenny, Ireland
- Died: 3 August 1515 (aged 88–89); London, England
- Buried: Mercers' Chapel, St Thomas of Acre, London
- Spouses: Anne Hankford; Lora Berkeley
- Issue: Anne Butler; Margaret Butler; Elizabeth Butler
- Father: James Butler, 4th Earl of Ormond
- Mother: Joan de Beauchamp

Thomas Butler, 7th Earl of Ormond PC (1426 – 3 August 1515) was the youngest son of James Butler, 4th Earl of Ormond. He was attainted, but restored by Henry VII's first Parliament in November 1485, and the statutes made at Westminster, by Edward IV, which declared him and his brothers traitors, were abrogated.

== Family ==
Arms of Butler, Earl of Ormond

Thomas Butler was the third son of James Butler, 4th Earl of Ormond, by his first wife, Joan de Beauchamp (d. 3 or 5 August 1430). He had two elder brothers, James Butler, 5th Earl of Ormond, and John Butler, 6th Earl of Ormond, as well as two sisters, Elizabeth Butler, who married John Talbot, 2nd Earl of Shrewsbury, and Anne Butler (d. 4 January 1435), who was contracted to marry Thomas FitzGerald, 7th Earl of Desmond, although the marriage appears not to have taken place.

== Career ==
Thomas Butler, as an Irish peer, should only have sat in the Irish Parliament. However, as a personal friend of Henry VII, he was summoned to the English Parliament in November 1488 as "Thomas Ormond de Rochford chevaler". At this time he was already 8th Earl of Carrick and 7th Earl of Ormond, having succeeded his elder brothers James Butler, 5th Earl of Ormond and John Butler, 6th Earl of Ormond, neither of whom left legitimate issue.

He was afterwards sworn of the Privy Council of England.

He was known as The Wool Earl, due to his enormous wealth. Besides being in the possession of major lands in the Irish counties of Kilkenny and Tipperary, and other lands in north County Dublin, he owned 72 manors in England, making him one of the richest subjects in the realm. He relied heavily on the advice and political skills of Walter Champfleur, Abbot of St Mary's Abbey, Dublin, until the abbot's death in 1498 or 1499. Champfleur collected his rents, stored money for him, and kept him informed of important political developments, especially in Parliament. Champfleur in return solicited favours for his relations, but on a more personal note wrote inquiring about the health of the Countess (Ormond's second wife Lora), who was pregnant with their only daughter Elizabeth. After Champfleur's death the Earl's relations with the Abbey, and particularly the new Abbot, John Orum, deteriorated markedly: Orum even refused to hand over money which he admitted was Ormond's property and was held in the Abbey only for safekeeping.

In 1509, he was appointed Lord Chamberlain to Catherine of Aragon. He held this post until 1512.

== Marriage and children ==
He married twice:

- Firstly in 1445 to Anne Hankford (1431–1485), daughter and co-heiress of Sir Richard Hankford (c. 1397 – 1431) of Annery, Monkleigh, Devon, jure uxoris feudal baron of Bampton (grandson of Sir William Hankford (c. 1350 – 1423), Chief Justice of the King's Bench) by his 2nd wife Anne Montagu (d. 1457), a daughter of John Montacute, 3rd Earl of Salisbury (c. 1350 – 1400). By Anne Hankford he had two daughters and co-heiresses who inherited the Butler estates in England:
  - Lady Anne Butler (1455 - 5 June 1533), heiress through her mother of Annery, who married firstly Ambrose Cressacre, esquire, by whom she had no issue, and secondly Sir James St Leger (d. 1509), by whom she had two sons, Sir George St Leger, and James St Leger.
  - Lady Margaret Butler (c.1454–1539), who married Sir William Boleyn, by whom she had six sons and five daughters, including Thomas Boleyn, 1st Earl of Wiltshire, father of Queen Anne Boleyn, second wife of King Henry VIII.
- Secondly before November 1496, he married Lora Berkeley (1454–1501), widow successively of John Blount, 3rd Baron Mountjoy (by whom she had two sons and two daughters), and Sir Thomas Montgomery (d. 2 January 1495) of Faulkbourne, Essex, and daughter of Edward Berkeley (d. March 1506) of Beverston Castle, Gloucestershire, by his wife Christian Holt (d.1468), second daughter and coheir of Richard Holt. By his second wife Lora Berkeley, Ormond had one daughter:
  - Elizabeth Butler (d. 1510).

== Death and succession ==
Ormond died on 3 August 1515 and was buried in the Mercers' Chapel of the Hospital of St Thomas of Acre in the City of London. As he died without male progeny the barony supposedly created in 1488 fell into abeyance. The Earldom devolved to his heir male and distant cousin Piers Butler, 8th Earl of Ormond, 1st Earl of Ossory (1467–1539), the grandson of his first cousin Sir Edmund MacRichard Butler (1420–1464) of Polestown, County Kilkenny, Ireland, a grandson of James Butler, 3rd Earl of Ormond (c. 1359 – 1405) of Gowran Castle in Ireland.

== See also ==
Butler dynasty

== Notes ==
Peerage of Ireland
Preceded by John Butler	Earl of Ormond; 1478–1515	Succeeded by Piers Butler
