= James Butler, 4th Earl of Ormond =

Irish earl (1393–1452)

- Born: 23 May 1393; Kilkenny, Ireland
- Died: 23 August 1452 (aged 59); Dublin, Ireland
- Buried: St. Mary's Abbey, Dublin
- Spouses: Joan de Beauchamp; Elizabeth FitzGerald
- Issue: James Butler, 5th Earl of Ormond; John Butler, 6th Earl of Ormond; Thomas Butler, 7th Earl of Ormond; Elizabeth Butler; Anne Butler
- Father: James Butler, 3rd Earl of Ormond
- Mother: Anne Welles

James Butler, 4th Earl of Ormond (23 May 1393 – 23 August 1452) was the son of James Butler, 3rd Earl of Ormond. He was called 'The White Earl', and was esteemed for his learning. He was the patron of the Irish literary work, 'The Book of the White Earl'. His career was marked by his long and bitter feud with the Talbot family.

== Family ==
James Butler was the second but eldest surviving son of James Butler, 3rd Earl of Ormond, and his first wife Anne Welles, daughter of John de Welles, 4th Baron Welles by Maude de Ros, daughter of William de Ros, 2nd Baron de Ros of Helmsley.

== Career ==
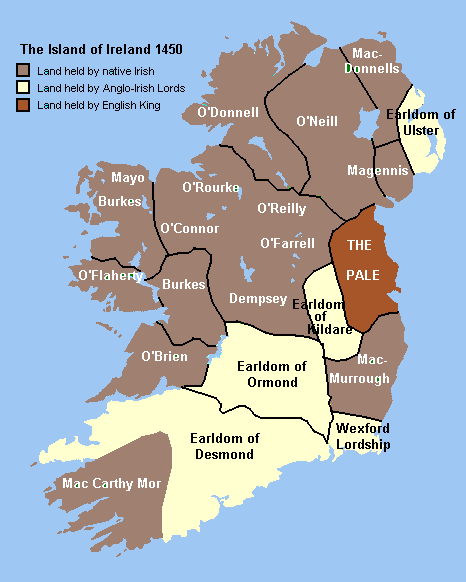
Ireland in 1450 showing the Earldom of Ormond.

He prevailed upon Henry V to create a King of Arms in Ireland, with the title of Ireland King of Arms (altered by Edward VI to Ulster King of Arms), and he gave lands in perpetuity to the College of Heralds, London. He was appointed Lord Deputy of Ireland in 1405, and Lord Lieutenant of Ireland in 1420, 1425, and 1442. He appointed James FitzGerald, 6th Earl of Desmond as Seneschal of Imokilly in 1420.

=== The Butler–Talbot feud ===
His term as Lord Lieutenant was marked by his bitter feud with the Talbot family, headed by John Talbot, 1st Earl of Shrewsbury, and his brother Richard, Archbishop of Dublin, which is said to have involved feelings of actual hatred on both sides. The feud dominated Irish politics to such a degree that almost no public figure could remain neutral: all ended as supporters of one or the other faction. The dispute reached its height in 1442 when Archbishop Talbot, supposedly acting on behalf of the Irish Parliament, presented the Privy Council with a long list of grievances against Ormond, who was accused of being old and feeble (in fact he was only fifty, which was not considered a great age even in the fifteenth century), and of having lost most of his Irish estates through negligence; there were also vague references to treason and "other crimes which could not be named".

The Council summoned Ormond to account for his actions: he defended himself vigorously, and made detailed counter-charges against the Archbishop. The Council took no action against him. Instead, it rebuked both sides of the dispute severely for disrupting the good governance of Ireland.

In 1444, Ormond, in an effort to bolster his position, summoned a meeting of the Great Council at Drogheda, and inquired whether there were any complaints about his government. The Council through its Speaker, Sir James Alleyn, replied that they had no complaints, but on the contrary, were truly grateful to Ormond for his "good and gracious rule" and his "laborious defence of the realm" and that his continued rule was necessary for the public good.

The feud gradually cooled off, and friendly relations between the two families were finally established by the marriage of Ormond's daughter Elizabeth to Shrewsbury's son and heir John.

=== Later years ===
Ormond remained an influential figure in Irish politics, although his later years were troubled by fresh quarrels with the Earl of Desmond, with Giles Thorndon, the Treasurer of Ireland, whom he accused of threatening to murder him, with Thomas Fitzgerald, Prior of the Knights Hospitaller at Kilmainham, and with Richard Wogan, the Lord Chancellor of Ireland. Wogan, in particular, complained that he was no longer able to endure the burden of Ormond's "heavy lordship" and asked to be allowed to deputize his duties. Relations between Ormond and Prior Fitzgerald became so bad that in 1444 it was seriously suggested that they settle the matter through trial by combat, but King Henry VI intervened personally to persuade them to make peace. FitzGerald was removed from office a few years later.

In 1440, Ormond had a grant of the temporalities of the See of Cashel for ten years, following the death of the Archbishop of Cashel, Richard O'Hedian. He built the castles of Nenagh, Roscrea and Templemore in North County Tipperary and Tulleophelim (or Tullowphelim) in County Carlow. He gave the manor and advowson of Hickcote in Buckinghamshire to the Hospital of St Thomas of Acre in London, which was confirmed by the Parliament of England (in the third year of Henry VI) at the suit of his son.

Since his father-in-law had no surviving son, Ormond, in right of his second wife Elizabeth, claimed possession of the Earldom of Kildare, and for some years he was able to keep the legitimate heir out of his inheritance.

He died in Dublin on 23 August 1452 on his return from an expedition against Connor O'Mulrian, and was buried in St. Mary's Abbey near Dublin.

== Marriage and Children ==
He married firstly, in 1413, Joan Beauchamp (1396–1430), the daughter of William de Beauchamp, 1st Baron Bergavenny and Joan FitzAlan, by whom he had three sons and two daughters:

- James Butler, 5th Earl of Ormond, who was executed by the victorious House of York after the Battle of Towton; he had no issue.
- John Butler, 6th Earl of Ormond, who had three illegitimate sons, but no legitimate children.
- Thomas Butler, 7th Earl of Ormond.
- Elizabeth Butler (1420 – 8 Sept. 1473), who married John Talbot, 2nd Earl of Shrewsbury.
- Anne Butler, who died unmarried.

He married secondly, by licence dated 18 July 1432, Elizabeth FitzGerald (c. 1398 – 6 August 1452), widow of John Grey, 2nd Baron Grey of Codnor (died 14 September 1430), and daughter of Gerald FitzGerald, 5th Earl of Kildare and his second wife Agnes Darcy, by whom he had no children.

== See also ==
- Butler dynasty

== Notes ==
Peerage of Ireland
Preceded by James Butler	Earl of Ormond; 1405–1452	Succeeded by James Butler
