= Thomas Beauchamp, 12th Earl of Warwick =

14th-century English nobleman

Thomas de Beauchamp
- Earl of Warwick
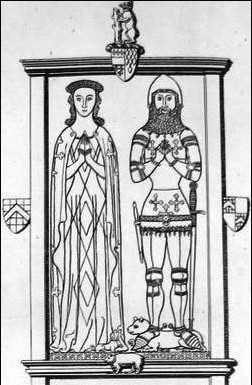
- Monumental effigies of Thomas de Beauchamp, 12th Earl of Warwick, and his wife Margaret Ferrers. He displays the arms of Beauchamp on his surcoat, she displays the arms of Ferrers of Groby on her mantle, and above impaled by Beauchamp. On top is the Bear and Ragged Staff cognisance of the Earls of Warwick. At left and quartered at right are the arms of Newburgh, Earl of Warwick. Collegiate Church of St Mary, Warwick

Earl of Warwick
- Predecessor: Thomas de Beauchamp, 11th Earl of Warwick
- Successor: Richard de Beauchamp, 13th Earl of Warwick
- Born: 16 March 1338
- Died: 8 April 1401 (aged 63)
- Buried: Collegiate Church of St Mary, Warwick
- Noble family: Beauchamp
- Spouse: Margaret Ferrers
- Issue: Richard Beauchamp, 13th Earl of Warwick; Lady Katherine Beauchamp; Lady Margaret Beauchamp
- Father: Thomas de Beauchamp, 11th Earl of Warwick
- Mother: Lady Katherine Mortimer

Arms of Beauchamp: Gules, a fesse between six cross crosslets or

Thomas de Beauchamp, 12th Earl of Warwick, KG (16 March 1338 – 8 April 1401) was an English medieval nobleman and one of the primary opponents of Richard II.

== Origins ==
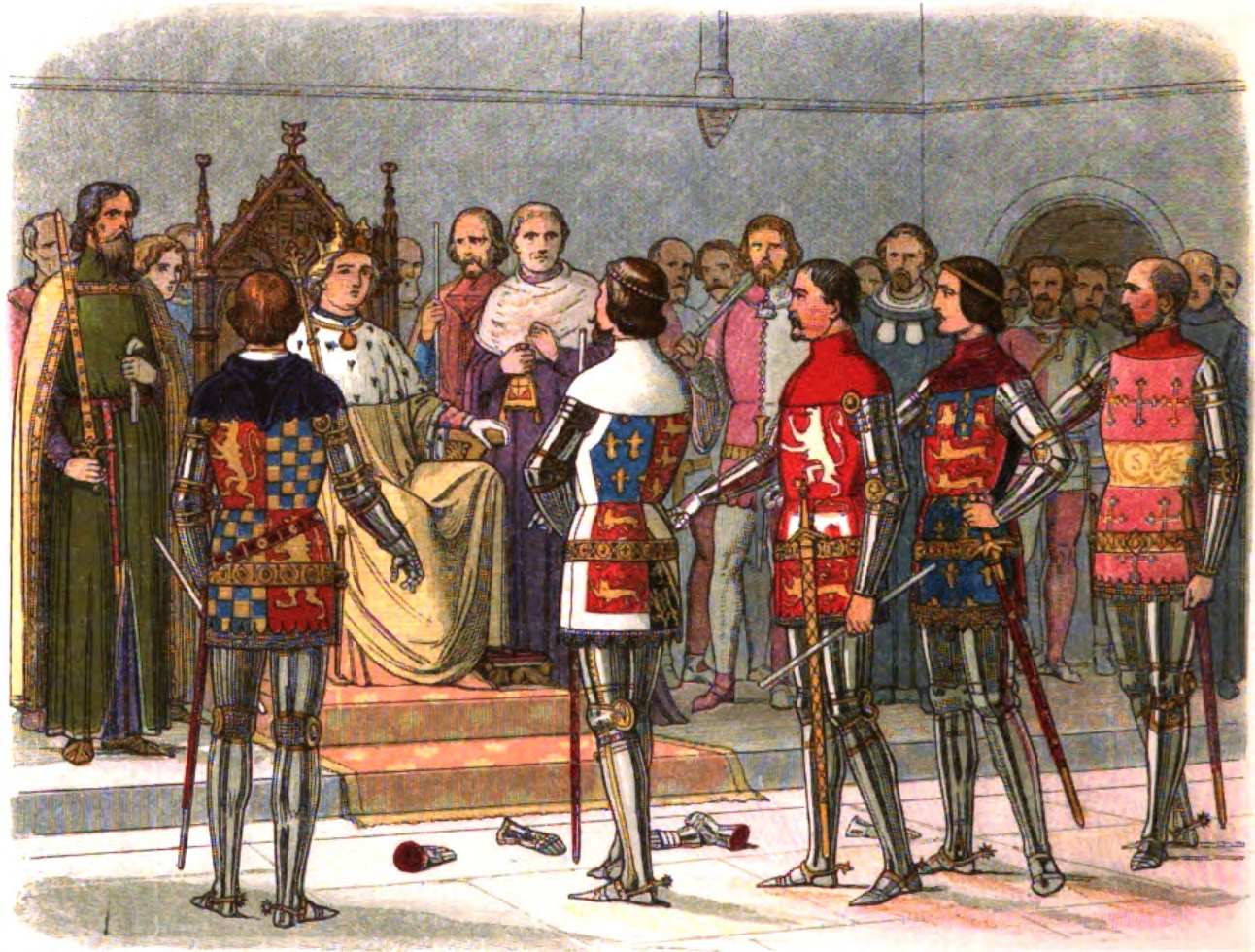
Richard FitzAlan, 11th Earl of Arundel; Thomas of Woodstock, 1st Duke of Gloucester; Thomas de Mowbray, Earl of Nottingham; Henry, Earl of Derby (later Henry IV); and Thomas de Beauchamp, 12th Earl of Warwick, throw down their gauntlets and demand Richard II to let them prove by arms the justice for their rebellion

He was the son of Thomas de Beauchamp, 11th Earl of Warwick by his wife Katherine Mortimer, a daughter of Roger Mortimer, 1st Earl of March (d.1369).

== Career ==
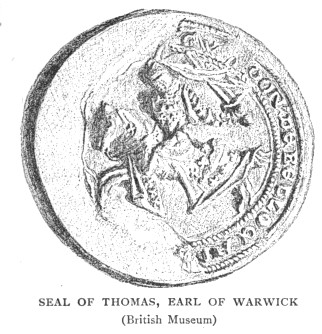
Seal of Thomas de Beauchamp, 12th Earl of Warwick

Knighted around 1355, Beauchamp accompanied John of Gaunt in campaigns in France in 1373, and around that time was made a Knight of the Garter. In the parliaments of 1376 and 1377 he was one of those appointed to supervise reform of King Richard II's government. When these were not as effective as hoped, Beauchamp was made Governor over the King. In 1377, or 1378, he granted the manors of Croome Adam (now Earls Croome) in Worcestershire and Grafton Flyford in Warwickshire to Henry de Ardern for a red rose. Between 1377 and 1378 he was appointed Admiral of the North. Beauchamp brought a large contingent of soldiers and archers to King Richard's Scottish campaign of 1385.

=== Conflict with King Richard II ===
In 1387, he was one of the Lords Appellant, who endeavored to separate Richard II from his favorites. After Richard regained power, Beauchamp retired to his estates, but was invited to London on a ruse in 1397 and charged with high treason, supposedly as a part of the Earl of Arundel's alleged conspiracy. He was imprisoned in the Tower of London (in what is now known as the "Beauchamp Tower"), pleaded guilty and threw himself on the mercy of the king. He forfeited his estates and titles, and was sentenced to life imprisonment on the Isle of Man. The next year, however, he was moved back to the Tower, until he was released in August 1399 after Henry Bolingbroke's capture of Richard II.

=== Restored by King Henry IV ===
After Bolingbroke deposed Richard and became king as Henry IV, Beauchamp was restored to his titles and estates. He was one of those who urged the new King to murder Richard, and accompanied King Henry against the rebellion of 1400.

== Marriage and children ==
Arms of Ferrers (of Groby): Gules, seven mascles or 3,3,1

He married Margaret Ferrers, daughter of William Ferrers, 3rd Baron Ferrers of Groby by his wife Margaret d'Ufford, a daughter of Robert d'Ufford, 1st Earl of Suffolk. by his wife he had children including:

- Richard de Beauchamp, 13th Earl of Warwick (1382–1439), son and heir.
- Agnes de Beauchamp, married Thomas Borges of Wraxall & Braunton (d. 1401).

== Death and succession ==
Beauchamp died in 1401 (sources differ as to whether on 8 April or 8 August). and was succeeded by his son Richard de Beauchamp, 13th Earl of Warwick. He was buried with his wife Margaret in the south transept of the Collegiate Church of St Mary, Warwick, but their tomb was destroyed by fire in 1694. Only the monumental brass survived, which is still on display at St Mary's.

== Ancestry ==
Ancestors of Thomas Beauchamp, 12th Earl of Warwick

8. William de Beauchamp, 9th Earl of Warwick
4. Guy de Beauchamp, 10th Earl of Warwick
9. Maud FitzJohn
2. Thomas de Beauchamp, 11th Earl of Warwick
10. Ralph VII de Toeni, Lord Toeni of Flamsted
5. Alice de Toeni
11. Mary ??
1. Thomas de Beauchamp
12. Edmund Mortimer, 2nd Baron Mortimer
6. Roger Mortimer, 1st Earl of March
13. Margaret de Fiennes
3. Katherine Mortimer
14. Sir Piers de Geneville
7. Joan de Geneville, 2nd Baroness Geneville
15. Jeanne of Lusignan

== Sources ==
- Goodman, Anthony (1971). The Loyal Conspiracy:The Lords Appellant under Richard II. University of Miami Press.
- Gundy, A. K. (2013). Richard II and the Rebel Earl. Cambridge University Press.
- Round, J. H. (1885). "Beauchamp, Thomas de" . In Stephen, Leslie (ed.). Dictionary of National Biography. Vol. 4. London: Smith, Elder & Co.

Peerage of England
Preceded by Thomas de Beauchamp	Earl of Warwick; 1369–1401	Succeeded by Richard de Beauchamp
