= Thomas Beauchamp, 11th Earl of Warwick =

English nobleman and military commander (1313–1369)

Thomas de Beauchamp KG
- Earl of Warwick
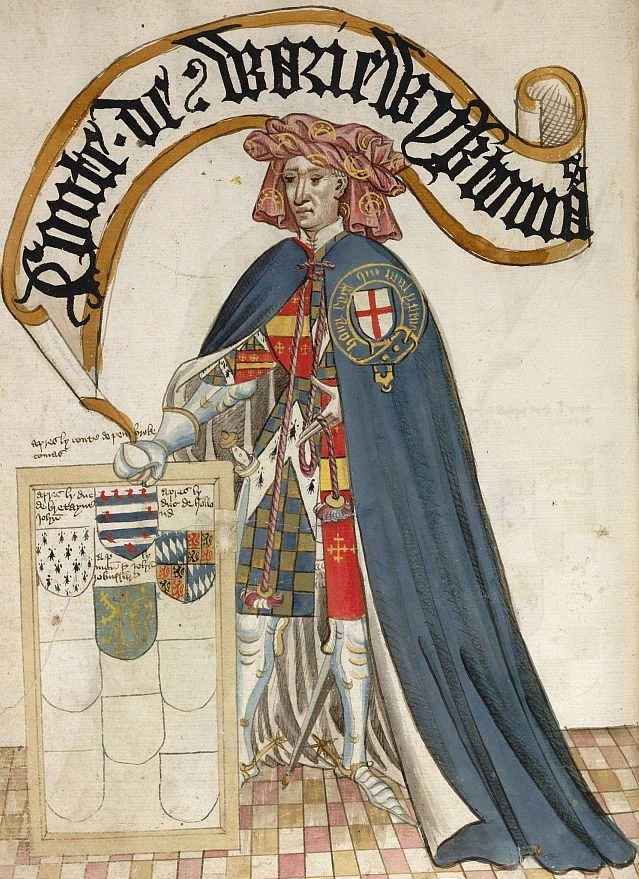
- Thomas de Beauchamp, 11th Earl of Warwick, KG, third founder knight of the Order of the Garter, shown wearing his garter robes over his tunic showing the arms of Beauchamp quartering Newburgh. Illustration from the 1430 Bruges Garter Book made by William Bruges (1375–1450), first Garter King of Arms
- Born: c. 14 February 1313; Warwick Castle, Warwickshire, England
- Died: 13 November 1369 (aged 56); Calais, France
- Buried: Collegiate Church of St Mary, Warwick
- Noble family: Beauchamp
- Spouse: Katherine Mortimer
- Issue See details: Guy de Beauchamp II; Thomas de Beauchamp, 12th Earl of Warwick; William de Beauchamp, 1st Baron Bergavenny; Philippa de Beauchamp, Countess of Stafford
- Father: Guy de Beauchamp, 10th Earl of Warwick
- Mother: Alice de Toeni

Thomas de Beauchamp, 11th Earl of Warwick, KG (c. 14 February 1313 – 13 November 1369), sometimes styled as Lord Warwick, was an English nobleman and military commander during the Hundred Years' War. His reputation as a military leader was so formidable that he was nicknamed "the devil Warwick" by the French. In 1348 he became one of the founders and the third Knight of the Order of the Garter.

Thomas was undoubtedly a brave warrior in battle and proved to be a strong military leader. For example, the 14th-century Anonimalle Chronicle states that when news arrived of his landing at Calais, the Duke of Burgundy, whose forces were camped nearby, made a hasty retreat under cover of darkness to avoid an encounter with "the devil Warwick".

He fought in Scotland as captain of the army against the Scots in 1337 at the age of 24. He also fought in the Hundred Years' Wars with France, commanding the English victory at the Battle of Crécy in 1346.

== Early life ==
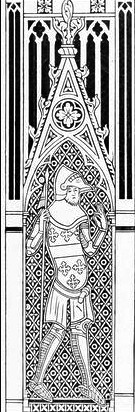
Thomas de Beauchamp, 11th Earl of Warwick depicted in 1347 as one of the eight mourners attached to the monumental brass of Sir Hugh Hastings (d. 1347) at St Mary's Church, Elsing, Norfolk. He displays the arms of Beauchamp on his tunic.

Thomas de Beauchamp was born at Warwick Castle, Warwickshire, England to Guy de Beauchamp, 10th Earl of Warwick and Alice de Toeni. He served in Scotland frequently during the 1330s, being captain of the army against the Scots in 1337. He was hereditary High Sheriff of Worcestershire from 1333 until his death (in 1369). In 1344, he was also made High Sheriff of Warwickshire and Leicestershire for life.

== Victor at Crécy and Poitiers ==
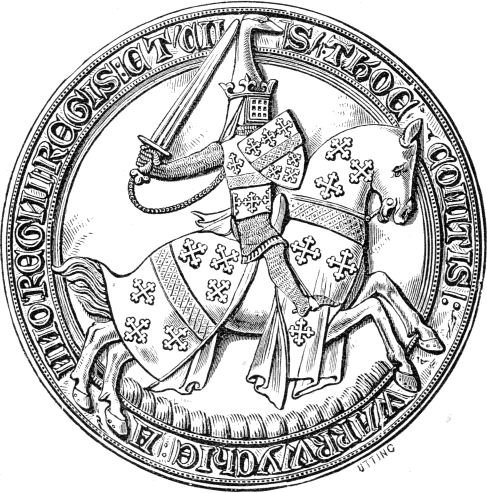
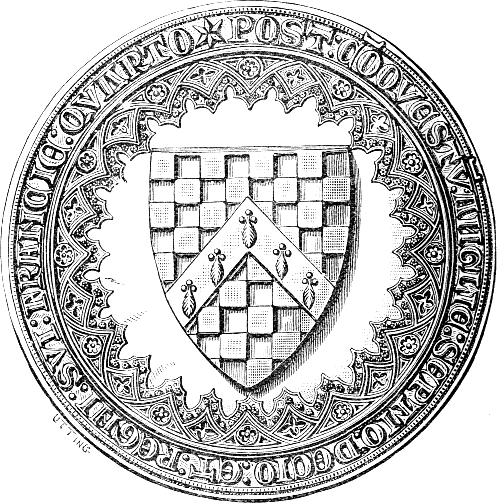
Left: seal (obverse) of Thomas de Beauchamp, 11th Earl of Warwick, dated 1344: S(IGILLUM) THO(M)E COMITIS WARRWYCHIE ANNO REGNI REGIS E(DWARDII) TE(RT)II...(continued on counter-seal) ("Seal of Thomas, Count (Earl) of Warwick in the year of the reign of King Edward the Third..."). He displays on his surcoat, shield and horse's caparison the arms of Beauchamp, and carries on his helm as crest a swan's head and neck; right: Counter-seal/reverse: (legend continued from face of seal) ...POST CO(N)QUESTU(M) ANGLIE SEPTI(M)O DECIM(0) ET REGNI SUI FRANCIE QUARTO ("...after the Conquest of England the seventeenth and of his reign of the Kingdom of France the fourth"). This dates the seal to 1344. The arms are those of de Newburgh, the family of the Beaumont Earls of Warwick: Checky azure and or, a chevron ermine. This same display of double arms was used on the seal of his father Guy de Beauchamp, 10th Earl of Warwick on his seal affixed to the Barons' Letter, 1301.

Warwick was Marshal of England from 1343/4 until 1369, and was one of the commanders at the great English victories at Crécy and Poitiers, as well as the Siege of Calais in 1346.

Thomas de Beauchamp fought in all the French wars of King Edward III; he commanded the centre at the Battle of Crécy (where many of his relatives were killed, including his younger half-brother Alan la Zouche de Mortimer). He was trusted to be guardian of the sixteen-year-old Black Prince.

He began the rebuilding of the Collegiate Church of Saint Mary in Warwick, supposedly using money received from the ransom of the archbishop of Sens, whom he captured at Poitiers, but that is an oversimplification.

== Marriage and children ==
Left: arms of Beauchamp: Gules, a fesse between six crosses crosslet or; Right: arms of Newburgh Earls of Warwick: Checky azure and or a chevron ermine

He married Katherine Mortimer, daughter of Roger Mortimer, 1st Earl of March. They had six sons and ten daughters:

- Guy de Beauchamp (died 28 April 1360); married Philippa de Ferrers, daughter of Henry de Ferrers, 2nd Lord Ferrers of Groby, and Isabel de Verdun, by whom he had two daughters: Elizabeth (died c. 1369), and Katherine, who became a nun. His daughters were, by entail, excluded from their grandfather's inheritance.
- Thomas de Beauchamp, 12th Earl of Warwick (16 March 1339 – 8 August 1401), married Margaret Ferrers, daughter of William Ferrers, 3rd Lord of Groby, and Margaret de Ufford, by whom he had issue, including Richard Beauchamp, 13th Earl of Warwick.
- Reinbrun de Beauchamp (died 1361)
- William de Beauchamp, 1st Baron Bergavenny (c. 1343 – 8 May 1411); inherited the honour of Abergavenny. On 23 July 1392, married Lady Joan FitzAlan, daughter of Richard FitzAlan, 11th Earl of Arundel and Lady Elizabeth de Bohun, by whom he had a son, Richard de Beauchamp, 1st Earl of Worcester, and a daughter, Joan de Beauchamp, Countess of Ormond. Queen consort Anne Boleyn was a notable descendant of the latter.
- Roger de Beauchamp (died 1361)
- Maud de Beauchamp (died 1403); married Roger de Clifford, 5th Baron de Clifford, by whom she had issue, including Thomas de Clifford, 6th Baron de Clifford.
- Philippa de Beauchamp; married Hugh de Stafford, 2nd Earl of Stafford, by whom she had nine children.
- Alice Beauchamp (died 1383); married, firstly, John Beauchamp, 3rd Baron Beauchamp of Somerset, and, secondly, Sir Matthew Gournay. She died childless.
- Joan de Beauchamp; married Ralph Basset, 3rd Baron Basset of Drayton. She died childless.
- Isabel de Beauchamp (died 29 September 1416); married, firstly, John le Strange, 5th Baron Strange by whom she had a daughter, Elizabeth (1373–1383), and, secondly, William de Ufford, 2nd Earl of Suffolk. Upon the latter's death, she became a nun. She died without living issue.
- Margaret de Beauchamp; married Guy de Montfort. This marriage was childless. After his death in 1261, she became a nun until 1269.
- Elizabeth de Beauchamp; married Thomas de Ufford KG.
- Anne de Beauchamp; married Walter de Cokesey.
- Juliana de Beauchamp
- Katherine de Beauchamp; became a nun at Shouldham Priory.
- Ramburne de Beauchamp; had one issue named Eleanora.

Catherine Grandison, Countess of Salisbury was not his daughter, although she is presented as such in William Painter's Palace of Pleasure and in the Elizabethan play Edward III, which may be by William Shakespeare.

== Death ==
Beauchamp's wife Katherine died on 4 August 1369. Beauchamp died three months later at Calais aged 56, on 13 November 1369, of the Black Death and was buried alongside his wife in the chancel of St. Mary's Church, Warwick, Warwickshire.

== Ancestry ==
Ancestors of Thomas Beauchamp, 11th Earl of Warwick

8. William de Beauchamp of Elmley Castle
4. William de Beauchamp, 9th Earl of Warwick
9. Isabella Maudit
2. Guy de Beauchamp, 10th Earl of Warwick
10. John Fitzgeoffrey
5. Maud FitzJohn
11. Isabel Bigod
1. Thomas de Beauchamp
12. Roger V de Toeni
6. Ralph VII de Toeni, Lord Toeni of Flamsted
13. Alice de Bohun
3. Alice de Toeni
14.
7. Mary ??
15.

== Images ==
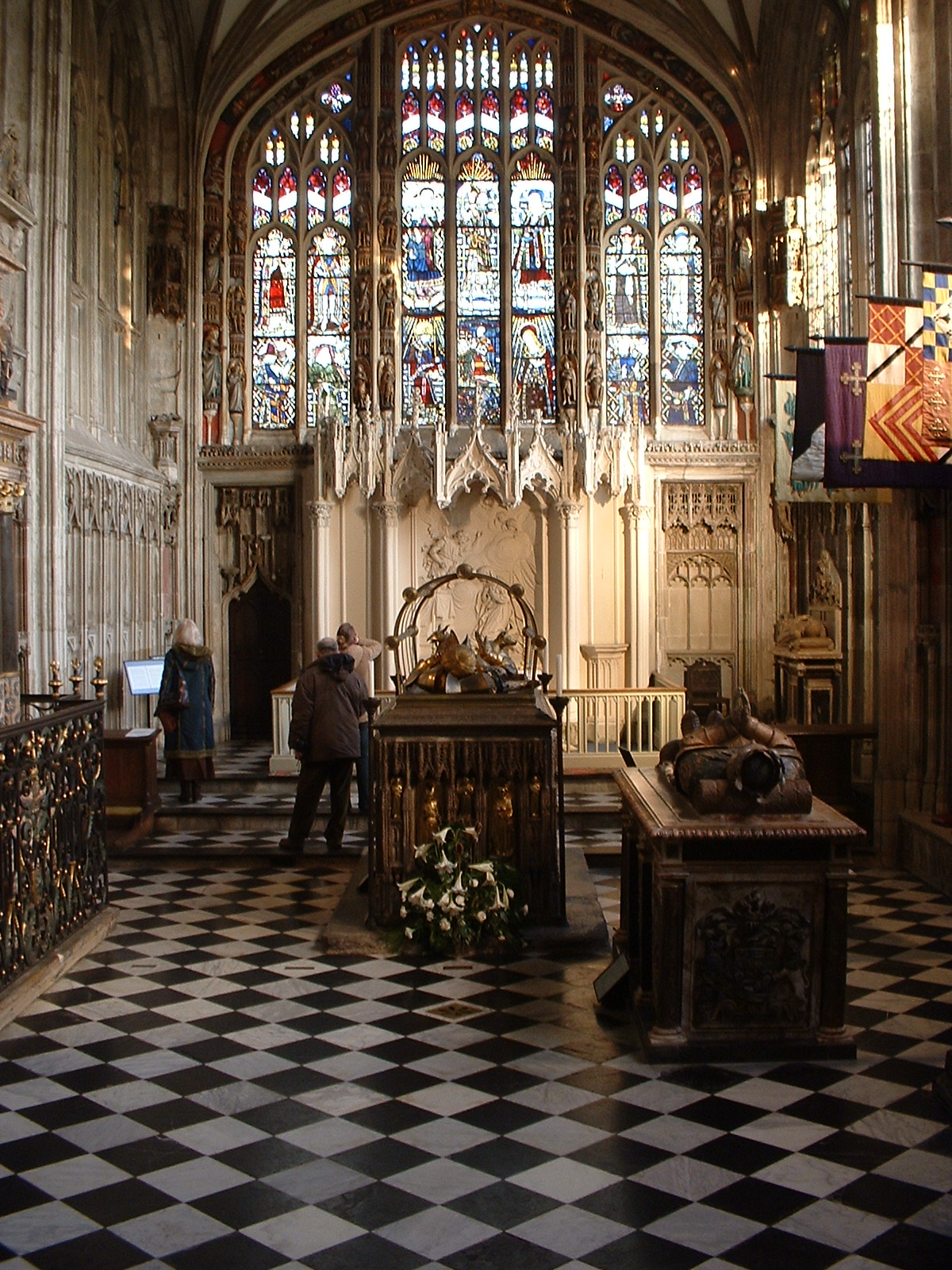
The stained glass at the Beauchamp Chapel at the College Church of St. Mary's displays seven different Beauchamp coats of arms. Note the banner with Warwick's arms partially in view on the right.

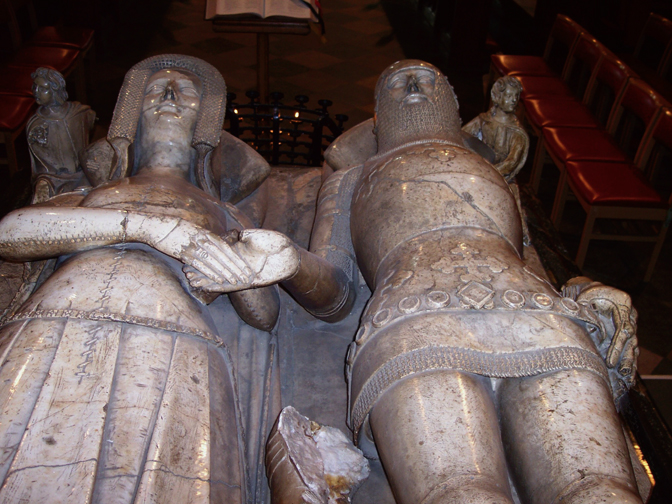
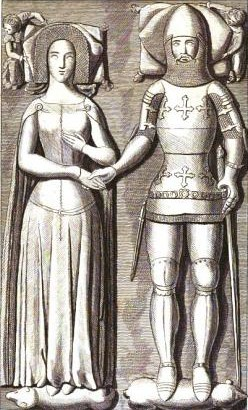
Left: Thomas de Beauchamp, 11th Earl of Warwick and Katherine Mortimer effigies in Warwick St. Mary's church; right: Drawing of effigies of Thomas de Beauchamp, 11th Earl of Warwick and Katherine Mortimer in St Mary's Church, Warwick

== Sources ==
- Tuck, Anthony (2004). "Beauchamp, Thomas de, eleventh earl of Warwick (1313/14–1369)". Oxford Dictionary of National Biography. Oxford University Press.

Peerage of England
Preceded by Guy de Beauchamp	Earl of Warwick; 1329–1369	Succeeded by Thomas de Beauchamp
