= Roger de Clifford =

Roger Clifford or Roger de Clifford may refer to:

- Roger de Clifford (died c. 1285)
- Roger de Clifford (died 1282) (died 1282), the son of the above
- Roger Clifford, 2nd Baron Clifford (1299–1322)
- Roger Clifford, 5th Baron Clifford (1333–1389)
- Sir Roger Clifford, 7th Baronet (born 1936)

== See also ==
- Clifford (surname)
- Clifford baronets
