= Feudal barony of Appleby =

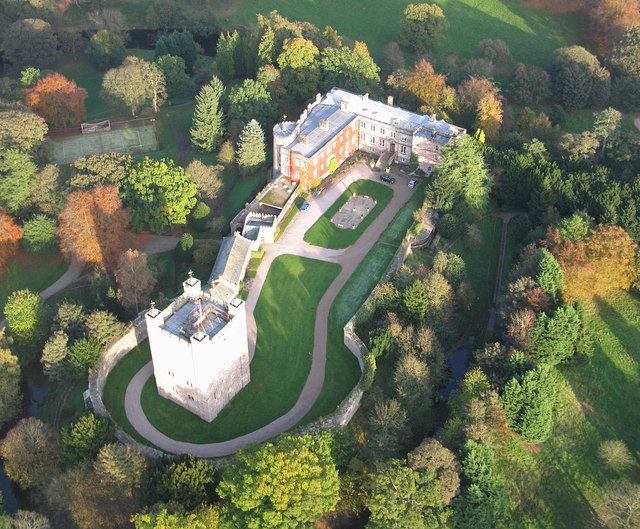
Appleby Castle, caput of the feudal barony of Appleby

The feudal barony of Appleby (or Honour of Appleby) was a feudal barony with its caput at Appleby Castle in Appleby, Westmorland, England.

== Descent ==
=== Barons of Burgh-by-Sands ===
The barony was formed from lands formerly controlled in the 12th century by the feudal barons of Burgh-by-Sands (pronounced "Bruff") in Cumberland, namely the families successively of de Trevers, Engaine, de Morville and de Lucy.

=== Vipont ===
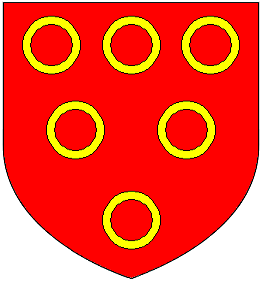
Arms of Vipont: Gules, six annulets or. Adopted at the start of the age of heraldry (circa 1200–1215). These arms were later quartered by the Clifford family

- Robert de Vipont (died 1228) was granted by King John in 1203/4 custody of Appleby and Brough in Westmorland with the hereditary office of Sheriff of Westmorland, to be held from the king under military tenure of 4 knight's fees. He married Idonea de Builli, daughter of John de Builli (died 1213) (a descendant of Roger de Busli) by his wife Cecily de Bussy, heiress to one-quarter moiety of the feudal barony of Old Wardon in Bedfordshire, which moiety thenceforth followed the descent of Appleby.
- John de Vipont (c. 1212 – 1241), son and heir, who married Sibyl, sister of William de Ferrers, 5th Earl of Derby (1193–1254).
- Robert de Vipont (1233/4-1264), who died from wounds received at the Battle of Lewes (1264) fighting on the side of Simon de Montfort. Following the defeat of de Montfort at the Battle of Evesham in 1265 and the return of King Henry III to power, Robert II's estate was seized by the Crown, but was later returned as part of a settlement with the reform leaders. He died leaving no sons, but with two daughters as co-heiresses, Isabel and Idoine (alias Idonea).
  - Isabel de Vipont (died 1291), co-heiress to her father, married Roger de Clifford (died 1282), feudal baron of Clifford, seated at Clifford Castle in Herefordshire, who was killed in Wales in 1282. Her son and only child was Robert de Clifford, 1st Baron de Clifford (1274–1314), in 1299 created by King John a baron by writ, having received seizin of his maternal inheritance in 1295, also from 1310 feudal baron of Skipton. Robert was killed at the Battle of Bannockburn in 1314.
  - Idoine de Vipont (died 1333), co-heiress to her father, who married twice but left no children. Firstly to Roger de Leyburne (died 1284) and secondly to John de Cromwell (died 1335). In 1308 she granted her moiety of the barony of Appleby to her nephew Robert de Clifford, 1st Baron de Clifford, who thenceforth held the barony entire.

=== Clifford ===
Arms of Clifford: Checky or and azure, a fesse gules These are the arms borne by Robert de Clifford, 1st Baron de Clifford (c. 1274 – 1314), as recorded in the Caerlaverock Roll of 1300

Following the acquisition of the whole of the feudal barony of Appleby by Robert de Clifford, 1st Baron de Clifford (1274–1314), it descended thenceforth in the Clifford family, together with the feudal barony of Skipton and the barony by writ of de Clifford.
