= Walter Clifford =

Walter Clifford may refer to:

- Walter de Clifford (died 1190)
- Walter de Clifford (died 1221)
- Walter de Clifford (died 1263)
- Sir Walter Clifford, 4th Baronet (1852–1944), of the Clifford baronets

== See also ==
- Clifford (surname)
