= Walter de Clifford =

Walter de Clifford may refer to one of three generations of Marcher Lords:

- Walter de Clifford (died 1190)
- Walter de Clifford (died 1221)
- Walter de Clifford (died 1263)

== See also ==
- Clifford (surname)
