= Justice in eyre =

In English law, the justices in eyre were the highest magistrates, and presided over the court of justice-seat, a triennial court held to punish offenders against the forest law and enquire into the state of the forest and its officers (eyre, meaning "circuit", refers to the movement of the court between the different royal forests).

Technically, the two justices were referred to as citra and ultra Trent (on the same side or across the River Trent), depending on where the royal court was held at the time, but are usually referred to in absolute geographical terms north and south. A holder was earlier usually referred to as a "justice of the forest" until the reign of Henry VIII, when the title of "justice in eyre" prevailed, except from 1311 to 1397, when they were usually styled "warden of the forest". However, they were "justices in eyre" in the Treason Act 1351 (under which it was high treason to kill them in the execution of their office).

Henry de Bracton says that it was the practice of the justices to retire and confer with the busones of the county. In these busones we can see the persons whose names appear in the commissions of gaol delivery, oyer, and terminer, and who were in later days, as justices of the peace, to rule the county.

With the decay of forest law and the lapse of the court of justice-seat, the post became a sinecure. The Abolition of Certain Officers of Royal Forests Act 1817 (57 Geo. 3. c. 61) abolished the posts after the decease of the current holders.

== List ==
=== Early justices ===
The arrangement of justices north and south of Trent did not become fixed until 1236.

- John Marshall (appointed 8 November 1217), justice of the forest of all England
- Brian de l'Isle (appointed 6 March 1220), justice of the forest of all England
- Hugh de Neville (appointed 29 April 1224), justice of the forest of all England
- Brian de l'Isle (appointed 8 October 1229), justice of the forest in the counties of Northumberland, Cumberland, York, Lancaster, Derby, Lincoln, Rutland, Northampton, Buckingham, Essex, Cambridge, Huntingdon, and Oxford excepting the bailiwick of Thomas of Langley.
- John of Monmouth (appointed 8 October 1229), justice of the forest in the counties of Stafford, Salop, Worcester, Warwick, Gloucester, Hereford, Devon, Somerset, Dorset, Southampton, Wiltshire, Berkshire, Surrey, and the bailiwick of Thomas of Langley
- Peter d'Airvault (appointed 7 July 1232), justice of the forest of all England

=== North of the Trent ===
- John fitz Geoffrey (appointed 21 October 1241)
- …
- Geoffrey de Neville, October 1270 – c.March 1285
- William de Vesci, 1285 – 1290
- …
- Robert Clifford, 7 July 1298 – 12 March 1308 (created Baron Clifford 1299)
- John Segrave, 2nd Baron Segrave, March 1308 – 1 October 1310
- Piers Gaveston, 1st Earl of Cornwall, 1 October 1310 – 1311
- Henry Percy, 1st Baron Percy, 2 December 1311 – 1312
- …
- Henry le Scrope, appointed 10 September 1323
- …
- Sir William Neville, May 1381 – 1387
- …
- Richard Neville, 5th Earl of Salisbury, appointed 1443
- …
- Henry Percy, 2nd Earl of Northumberland, December 1459 – 29 March 1461
- …
- Richard Neville, 16th Earl of Warwick, (4 March 1461?)21 November 1466
- …
- Henry Percy, 4th Earl of Northumberland, 12 June 1471 – 1472
- John Widdrington of Chipchase, 1472 – ?
- …
- Thomas Howard, 1st Earl of Surrey, 1489 – 1509
- Thomas Darcy, 1st Baron Darcy de Darcy, 18 June 1509 – June 1537 (executed 1537)
- Thomas Cromwell, 1st Baron Cromwell, 30 December 1537 – June 1540 (created Earl of Essex 17 April 1540) (executed 1540)
- Thomas Manners, 1st Earl of Rutland, 9 August 1540 – 20 September 1543
- Sir Anthony Browne, 16 February 1546 – 6 May 1548
- Francis Talbot, 5th Earl of Shrewsbury, 24 May 1548 – 28 September 1560
- George Talbot, 6th Earl of Shrewsbury, 28 September 1560 – 18 November 1590
- Gilbert Talbot, 7th Earl of Shrewsbury, 16 December 1603 – 8 May 1616
- Sir George Villiers, 25 July 1616 – 8 November 1619 (created Viscount Villiers 27 August 1616, Earl of Buckingham 5 January 1617 and Marquess of Buckingham 1 January 1618)
- Francis Manners, 6th Earl of Rutland, 19 November 1619 – 17 December 1632
- Thomas Howard, 21st Earl of Arundel, 25 February 1634 – 4 October 1646
- John Manners, 8th Earl of Rutland 1646–1661
- William Cavendish, 1st Marquess of Newcastle, 16 July 1661 – 25 December 1676 (created Duke of Newcastle 16 March 1665)
- Henry Cavendish, 2nd Duke of Newcastle, 28 March 1677 – bef. 26 April 1689
- William Pierrepont, 4th Earl of Kingston-upon-Hull, 26 April 1689 – 17 September 1690
- William Cavendish, 4th Earl of Devonshire, November 1690 – 18 August 1707 (created Duke of Devonshire 12 May 1694)
- William Cavendish, 2nd Duke of Devonshire, 13 November 1707 – 19 May 1711
- John Holles, 1st Duke of Newcastle, 18 May 1711 – 15 July 1711
- Thomas Osborne, 1st Duke of Leeds, 17 October 1711 – 26 July 1712
- Evelyn Pierrepont, 1st Marquess of Dorchester, 7 December 1714 – 11 March 1717 (created Duke of Kingston-upon-Hull 10 August 1715)
- Thomas Fane, 6th Earl of Westmorland, 11 March 1717 – 11 May 1719
- Bennet Sherard, 1st Earl of Harborough, 11 May 1719 – 16 October 1732
- John Wallop, 1st Viscount Lymington, 11 January 1733 – 30 July 1734
- Peregrine Bertie, 2nd Duke of Ancaster and Kesteven, 30 July 1734 – 1 January 1742
- George Brudenell, 4th Earl of Cardigan, 19 February 1742 – 21 February 1752
- Edward Seymour, 8th Duke of Somerset, 21 February 1752 – 12 December 1757
- Richard Edgecumbe, 1st Baron Edgecumbe, 3 February 1758 – 22 November 1758
- Samuel Sandys, 1st Baron Sandys, 10 February 1759 – 22 April 1761
- Thomas Osborne, 4th Duke of Leeds, 22 April 1761 – 15 March 1774
- Thomas Pelham, 2nd Baron Pelham of Stanmer, 15 March 1774 – 27 November 1775
- Thomas Lyttelton, 2nd Baron Lyttelton, 27 November 1775 – 27 November 1779
- Charles Wolfran Cornwall, 22 September 1780 – 2 January 1789
- George Evelyn Boscawen, 3rd Viscount Falmouth, 2 September 1789 – 30 October 1790
- The Hon. John Charles Villiers, 30 October 1790 – 22 December 1838 (succeeded as 3rd Earl of Clarendon 7 March 1824)

=== South of the Trent ===
- Richard de Montfiquet (appointed 11 November 1236)
- John Biset (22 May 1238 – 1241)
- John fitzGeoffrey (appointed 1241)
- Reynold de Mohun (appointed 1 April 1242)
- Gilbert de Segrave (appointed 6 May 1242)
- Robert Passelewe (appointed aft. 28 April 1245)
- Henrici de Bracton (appointed aft. 1245)
- Geoffrey of Langley (appointed 4 March 1249)
- Reynold de Mohun (appointed 25 October 1252)
- Arnold de Bois (appointed 16 February 1252)
- Robert Walerand (appointed 1 September 1256)
- Thomas Gresley (appointed 11 September 1259)
- Alan la Zouche (appointed 12 June 1261)
- Matthew de Colombières (appointed 21 April 1265)
- Roger de Clifford (died 1285?) (appointed 8 August 1265)
- Roger de Clifford the Younger (died 1282) (appointed 1 August 1270)
- Luke de Thaney (appointed 10 June 1281)
- Roger le Strange, 1st Baron Strange (appointed 21 October 1283)
- Hugh le Despenser, 1st Baron le Despencer (appointed 12 February 1296)
- Pain Tiptoft, 1st Baron Tibetot (appointed 18 August 1307)
- Hugh le Despenser, 1st Baron le Despencer (appointed 16 March 1307)
- Robert fitz Pain (appointed 2 December 1311)
- Hugh le Despenser, 1st Baron le Despencer (appointed 14 June 1312)
- Ralph de Monthermer, 1st Baron Monthermer (appointed 19 February 1314)
- Aymer de Valence, 2nd Earl of Pembroke (appointed 18 May 1320)
- Hugh le Despenser, 1st Earl of Winchester (27 June 1324 – 27 October 1326)
- Thomas Wake, 2nd Baron Wake of Liddell (appointed 30 November 1326)
- William la Zouche, 1st Baron Zouche of Mortimer (appointed 9 May 1328)
- John Maltravers (appointed 5 April 1329)
- Robert of Ufford (appointed 16 December 1330)
- Bartholomew de Burghersh, 1st Baron Burghersh (appointed 13 October 1335)
- William de Clinton, 1st Earl of Huntingdon (appointed 4 December 1343)
- Thomas de Berkeley, 3rd Baron Berkeley (appointed 25 August 1345)
- Thomas de Braose (appointed 28 January 1347)
- William of Wykeham (appointed 10 July 1361) jointly with...
- Peter Atte Wood (appointed 10 July 1361)
- John de la Lee (appointed 10 October 1367)
- John of Foxley (appointed 26 April 1368)
- Thomas Holland, 2nd Earl of Kent (21 July 1377 – 1397)
- Edward, Earl of Rutland (26 April 1397 – 25 October 1415)
- Humphrey, Duke of Gloucester (27 January 1415 – 23 February 1447)
- Richard Plantagenet, 3rd Duke of York (appointed 23 February 1447)
- Edmund Beaufort, 2nd Duke of Somerset (appointed 2 July 1453)
- William Fitzalan, 16th Earl of Arundel (appointed 19 December 1459)
- John Mowbray, 3rd Duke of Norfolk (11 July 1461 – 6 November 1461)
- Henry Bourchier, 1st Earl of Essex (1461? – 4 April 1483)
- William Fitzalan, 16th Earl of Arundel (appointed 1 July 1483)
- John Radcliffe, 9th Baron FitzWalter (appointed 14 January 1485) jointly with...
- Sir Reynold Bray (appointed 14 January 1485)
- Giles Daubeney, 8th Baron Daubeney (appointed 24 November 1493) (jointly with Bray)
- Sir Thomas Brandon, 2 June 1509 – 27 January 1510
- Sir Thomas Lovell, 6 February 1510 – 25 May 1524 (jointly with Dorset until his death)
- Thomas Grey, 2nd Marquess of Dorset, 17 June 1523 – 10 October 1530
- Charles Brandon, 1st Duke of Suffolk, 22 November 1534 – 22 August 1545
- William Paulet, 1st Baron St John, 17 December 1545 – before 2 February 1550 (created Earl of Wiltshire 19 January 1550)
- Henry Grey, 3rd Marquess of Dorset, 2 February 1550 – 12 November 1553 (created Duke of Suffolk 11 October 1551)
- Henry Radcliffe, 2nd Earl of Sussex, 19 November 1553 – 17 February 1557
- Thomas Radcliffe, 3rd Earl of Sussex, 1557/8 – 9 June 1583
- Francis Russell, 2nd Earl of Bedford, 26 February 1584 – 28 July 1585
- Robert Dudley, 1st Earl of Leicester, 25 November 1585 – 4 September 1588
- Henry Carey, 1st Baron Hunsdon, 17 January 1589 – 23 July 1596
- Charles Howard, 2nd Baron Howard of Effingham, 15 June 1597 – 14 December 1624 (created Earl of Nottingham 22 October 1597)
- George Villiers, 1st Duke of Buckingham, 22 January 1625 – 23 August 1628
- William Herbert, 3rd Earl of Pembroke, 9 September 1629 – 10 April 1630
- Henry Rich, 1st Earl of Holland, 25 May 1631 – 9 March 1649
- Aubrey de Vere, 20th Earl of Oxford, 27 June 1660 – before 14 January 1673
- James Scott, 1st Duke of Monmouth, 14 January 1673 – 27 December 1679
- Philip Stanhope, 2nd Earl of Chesterfield, 27 December 1679 – before 16 January 1686
- Theophilus Hastings, 7th Earl of Huntingdon, 16 January 1686 – before 24 April 1689
- John Lovelace, 3rd Baron Lovelace, 24 April 1689 – 27 September 1693
- James Bertie, 1st Earl of Abingdon, 29 November 1693 – before 15 May 1697
- Thomas Wharton, 5th Baron Wharton, 15 May 1697 – 11 July 1702
- vacant
- Thomas Wharton, 5th Baron Wharton, 9 September 1706 – 12 January 1711 (created Earl of Wharton 23 December 1706)
- Montagu Venables-Bertie, 2nd Earl of Abingdon, 12 January 1711 – 3 May 1715
- Charles Bennet, 1st Earl of Tankerville, 6 December 1715 – 21 May 1722
- Charles Cornwallis, 5th Baron Cornwallis, 5 July 1722 – 31 May 1740
- William Villiers, 3rd Earl of Jersey, 31 May 1740 – 26 July 1746
- George Montague-Dunk, 2nd Earl of Halifax, 26 July 1746 – 12 November 1748
- Thomas Osborne, 4th Duke of Leeds, 12 November 1748 – 13 January 1756
- Samuel Sandys, 1st Baron Sandys, 13 January 1756 – 15 December 1756
- John Campbell, 3rd Earl of Breadalbane, 15 December 1756 – 4 November 1765
- John Monson, 2nd Baron Monson, 4 November 1765 – 12 January 1767
- Charles Cornwallis, 2nd Earl Cornwallis, 12 January 1767 – 21 March 1769
- Sir Fletcher Norton, 21 March 1769 – 1 January 1789 (created Baron Grantley 9 April 1782)
- Thomas Townshend, 1st Viscount Sydney, 19 June 1789 – 30 June 1800
- Thomas Grenville, 13 August 1800 – 17 December 1846
