= Robert de Welles, 2nd Baron Welles =

13th and 14th-century English nobleman

Robert de Welles 2nd Baron de Welles
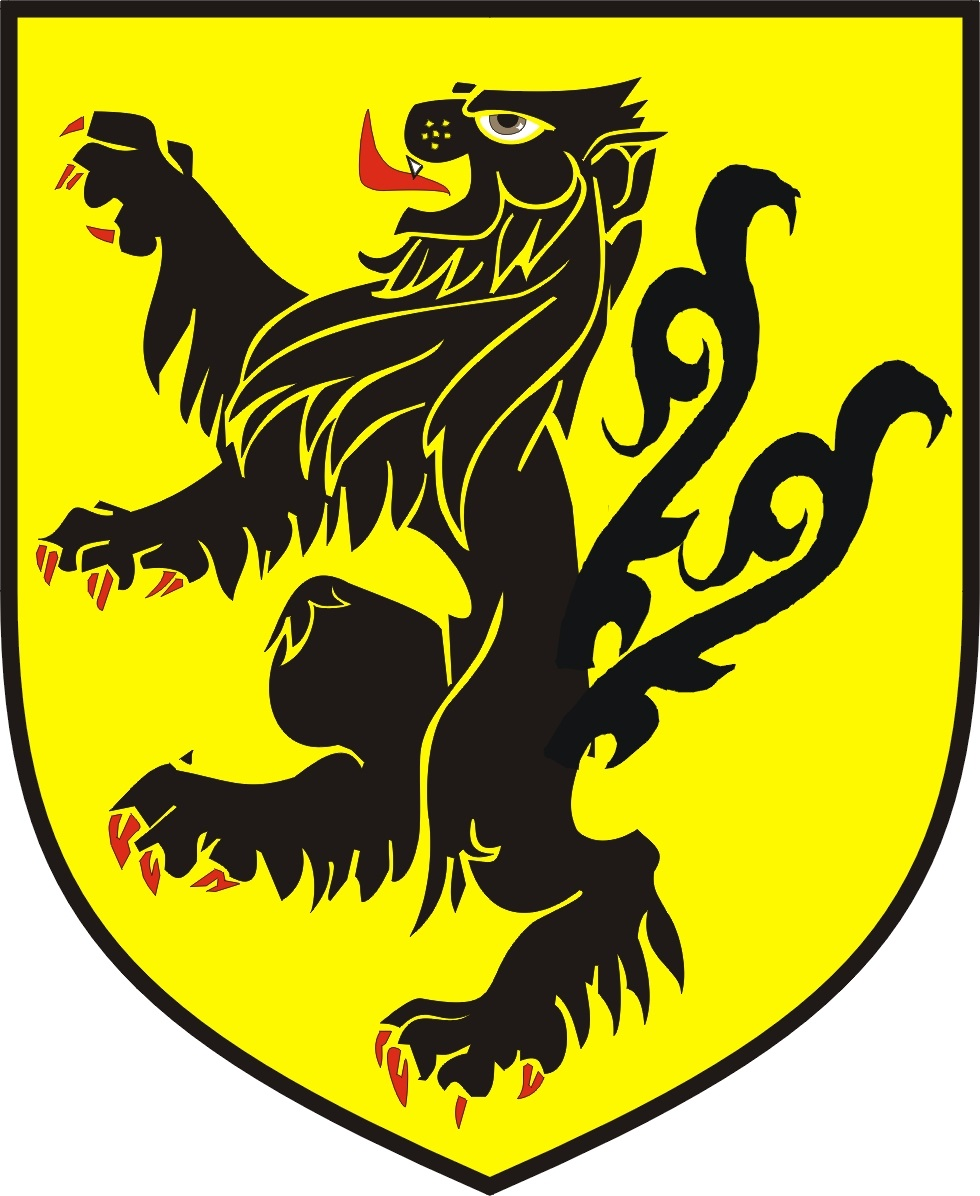
- Arms of the de Welles Family

Baron Welles
- Predecessor: Adam de Welles, 1st Baron Welles
- Successor: Adam de Welles, 3rd Baron Welles
- Born: 1296; Blatherwycke, East Northamptonshire Borough, Northamptonshire, England
- Died: August 1320 (aged 23–24)
- Family: de Welles
- Father: Adam de Welles, 1st Baron Welles
- Mother: Joan d'Engayne

Robert de Welles, 2nd Baron de Welles (1 January 1296 – August 1320) was the son of Adam de Welles, 1st Baron Welles and Joan d'Engayne. He was born at Blatherwycke, his maternal grandfather's manor. He was a ward of Gilbert de Clare, 7th Earl of Gloucester during his youth. In 1311, he succeeded his father as Baron Welles, and around the end of 1313, he succeeded his paternal grandmother Isabel, coheiress of Adam de Periton, in her inheritance.

Welles is sometimes said to have married Maud de Clare, daughter of Thomas de Clare, Lord of Thomond, but this confuses him with another Robert de Welle.

In 1319, Welles was summoned by Edward II of England to take part in his wars in Scotland, and participated in the unsuccessful siege of Berwick-upon-Tweed in the autumn of 1319. He died in August 1320, without children, and was succeeded as Baron Welles by his brother Adam de Welles.

Peerage of England
Preceded by Adam de Welles	Baron Welles; 1311–1320	Succeeded by Adam de Welles
