= Robert de Vieuxpont (died 1227/8) =

Anglo-Norman noble landowner and administrator

- Baron of Westmorland
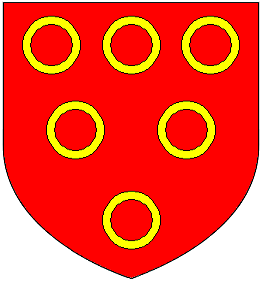
- Arms of Vipont: Gules, six annulets or. Later quartered by Baron de Clifford
- Died: before 1 February 1228
- Spouse: Idonea de Builli (m. 1213)
- Issue: 3

Robert de Vieuxpont (died 1227/8), also called Vipont, Veteripont, or de Vetere Ponte ("from the Old Bridge"), Baron of Westmorland, was an Anglo-Norman noble landowner and administrator.

He entered royal service and was initially employed in Normandy as a paymaster of troops and director of military works, including those on Rouen Castle. He was rewarded in February 1203 by being given custody of Appleby Castle and Brough Castle, to which the lordship of Westmorland was added a month later, together with the office of Sheriff of Westmorland, to be held in perpetuity by his heirs.

After returning from Normandy with King John in late 1203 Vieuxpont became increasingly involved in northern administration. In October 1204 he became High Sheriff of Nottinghamshire, Derbyshire and the Royal Forests including control of Nottingham Castle, an important power base and store of the royal treasury. In 1206 he was a justice and assessor of tallage in the northern counties, in 1207 he was given custody of the See of York, and in April 1208 custody of the See of Durham. From 1210 to 1216 he was Sheriff of Devon and from 1210 to 1213 Sheriff of Wiltshire. He was highly trusted by King John, who put in his care both his treasury, his son Richard and his niece Eleanor, Fair Maid of Brittany. In 1216 he was also entrusted with the custody of Carlisle Castle, and from 1217 to 1222 was appointed Sheriff of Cumberland. He successfully defended his extensive landholdings from Scottish depredation, and built Brougham Castle in the process. In 1227 he bequeathed his body and his estate at Wycombe in Buckinghamshire, to the Knights Templar, and died at some time before 1 February 1228.

== Ancestry ==
Robert was the younger son of William de Vieuxpont, who was Lord of Hardingstone, near Northampton, in 1199, and also held Alston and other places in Cumberland by grant of William, King of Scotland. His mother was Matilda or Maud, who is said by Dugdale to have been the daughter of Hugh de Morville of Oswaldkirk; she was perhaps connected with the house of Thomas FitzGospatric. Robert was of the house of Robert de Vieuxpont of Vieuxpont in Auge, or Eu, Normandy, who was sent by William the Conqueror to defend La Flèche in 1073 and was killed in the war against the Viscount Hubert de Beaumont in 1085. William, Robert's father, was the brother of another Robert, Lord of Courville and Chailloué, near Vieuxpont, and perhaps the Robert de Vieuxpont who in 1168 held eight knights' fees of the Honour of Totnes, Devon. Dugdale makes this Robert the same with the Robert who died in 1228, which seems unlikely. On 15 June 1202 John ordered the Seneschal of Normandy to give William possession of the lands of his brother Robert in Normandy.

== Biography ==
=== Career ===
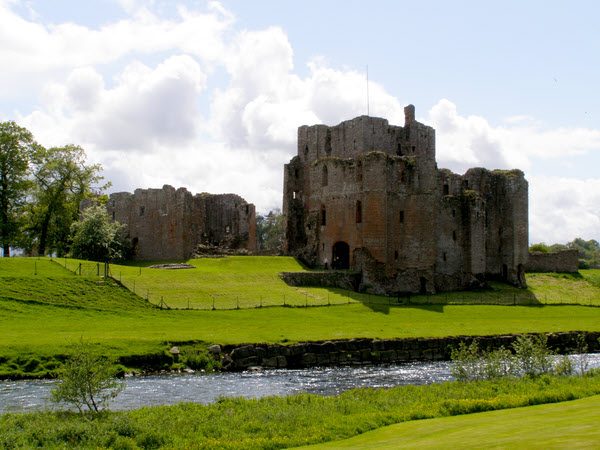
Brougham Castle in Cumbria, built by Robert de Vieuxpont

Robert the Younger has been supposed to have held some office in the Treasury under Richard I. Like other men of rank at the time, he was no doubt a good man of business, and had many money transactions with the Crown, accounting in 1197 for the term of the Honour of Tickhill in the West Riding. He was with John in Normandy in 1201, and paid him 20l. and a palfrey to have the custody of the lands of Richard of Scirinton, or Sherrington, Buckinghamshire, and had custody of Guy of Châtillon, afterwards Count of St. Pol.

In August 1202 he was present at the relief of Mirebeau, and received charge of several prisoners, whom he afterwards at the King's order delivered to Hugh de Gurnay. When Arthur (1187–1203) of Brittany was removed from Falaise in 1203, John committed him to Robert's custody at Rouen. As a reward for his services the King in 1202 gave him the castles of Appleby and Burgh, with the whole bailiwick of Westmoreland during pleasure, and in 1203 by another grant gave him the above to hold to him and his heirs by his then wife, thus passing over to him the barony of Westmoreland or Appleby. He further gave him the castles of Bowes and Richmond, Yorkshire, and sold to him for a hundred marks the custody of the heirs, land, and widow of Hugh Gernegan, remitting to him a debt of the same amount. In that year he was also Bailiff of Caen and the Rumois, and the King by a writ addressed to John Marshal ordered that he should have the Lordship of Vieuxpont beforetime held by Robert, his uncle, then deceased.

He had the custody of Nottingham Castle, and in 7 and 8 John (May 1205–May 1207) was custos of the counties of Nottingham and Derby, and Sheriff in 9 and 10 John (1207–9). From 12 to 17 John (1210–16) he was Sheriff of Devonshire, and in 12 John (1210–11) was joint, and in 13 and 14 John (1211–13) sole, Sheriff of Wiltshire. He acted as a judge, for fines were levied before him in 1206. In 1208 he received the custody of the bishopric of Durham. The king gave him many marks of his favour; he was with John at Carrickfergus and Dublin in 1210, and, along with his brother Ivo, is reckoned among his evil counsellors in the list given by Roger of Wendover under 1211. He took part in the war against the Welsh, and in 1212 caused the young Rhys ap Maelgon to be hanged at Shrewsbury. In 1213 he received livery of all the lands of his late father-in-law, John de Builli or Buisli (died 1212), Lord of the Honour of Tickhill, and gave the King four palfreys that he might have a fair at his Lordship of Bawtry in the West Riding during four days in Whitsun week.

=== First Barons' War ===
Vieuxpont did not join the confederate barons in 1214, and was among those who, after the confederates were received in London on 24 May 1215, were forced by threats to desert the King, though he still belonged to his party, and was soon active in supporting him. He received from John the custody of the castle of Carlisle and of the county of Cumberland, held the castle of Durham, had grants of the lands of the insurgents, and in 1216 was one of three lords appointed by the King to hold the castles and all else that belonged to the Crown in Yorkshire. In compliance with a summons from William Marshal (died 1219), as regent for Henry III, he joined the Earl of Chester at the siege of Mountsorrel Castle in April 1217, and on 20 May took part in the Battle of Lincoln. His brother Ivo being on the side of the King's enemies, a writ was issued to the Sheriff of Northamptonshire on the 12th to put Robert in possession of Hardingstone and the rest of Ivo's lands. He was one of the witnesses of the Treaty of Lambeth on 11 September, and is said to have been among the barons who, contrary to the orders of the government, kept possession of the castles and lands of the magnates of the other side; but his relations with the Government during the next few years seem to have been friendly. He was Sheriff of Cumberland and a justice itinerant for Northumberland and Yorkshire in 1219. A case was pending in the king's court between him and the Countess of Eu in 1220, in which year he attended the second coronation of the King on 17 May. He appears to have disobeyed the order for the surrender of the royal castles, and in 1223 joined the Earl of Chester and the malcontents, but made submission with the rest of the party at Northampton, and on 30 December surrendered the castles that he held. He was one of the witnesses to the reissue of the Great Charter on 11 February 1225, was collector of the fifteenth in Westmoreland and the bishopric of Carlisle, and had the custody of the castles of Nottingham, Bolsover, and the Peak. In 1226 he was again a justice itinerant for Northumberland and Yorkshire, and fines were levied before him in 1227.

=== Death ===
Viexpoint died in 1228, being then in debt to the crown over 1,997l. He gave lands at Rockley in Wiltshire to the Templars, and, by a charter dated 24 April 1210, Reagill and Milbourne Grange in Westmoreland to the Præmonstratensian abbey of Hepp or Shap in that county. His wife Idonea, who was daughter of John de Builly, and died in 1241, confirmed a donation made by her father, and gave a further grant, to the priory of Blythe, Nottinghamshire, granted her manor of Sandbeck in the West Riding to the Cistercian abbey of Roche, where she desired to be buried, and near which she appears to have resided in widowhood, and founded a chantry in the New Temple, London, for the souls of herself and her husband.

His son John, a minor at the time of his father's death, died in 1242, leaving a son, Robert de Vipont, who joined the party of Simon de Montfort, and died in 1265, being apparently slain in the Battle of Evesham, leaving two daughters coheiresses: Isabella, who married Roger de Clifford, and Idonea, who married Roger, son of Roger de Leybourne, or, according to a pedigree following visitations in 1575, 1615 and 1666, William de Lilburn, giving birth to John de Lilburn in 1279.

== Marriage and children ==
In 1213 he married Idonea or Idoine de Builli, daughter of John de Builli, a descendant of Roger de Busli, which match brought him more land and honours. By Idonea he had children:

- John Vipont (died 1242), who left children:
  - John Vipont (died 1241)
  - Isabel de Vieuxpont (died 1291), who married Roger de Clifford III (died 6 Nov 1282) and had Robert de Clifford (1274–1314)
  - Robert de Vieuxpont (died 1264), who died from wounds received at the Battle of Lewes (1264) fighting on the side of Simon de Montfort. Following the defeat of de Montfort at the Battle of Evesham in 1265 and the return of King Henry III to power, Robert II's estate was seized by the Crown, but was later returned as part of a settlement with the reform leaders, and the Vieuxpont inheritance was divided in moieties between the daughters and co-heiresses of Robert II – Isabella and Idonea. On the death of Idonea Vipont her moiety was regained by Isabella's husband Roger de Clifford, who thenceforth held one of the greatest northern lordships, ancestor of Robert de Clifford, 1st Baron de Clifford (c. 1274 – 1314), Feudal Baron of Skipton.
- Christiana Vipont, whom her father married off to his ward Thomas de Greystoke, son and heir of William de Greystoke, Baron of Greystoke in Cumberland.

== Bibliography ==
- Hunt, William (1899). "Vieuxpont, Robert de" . In Lee, Sidney (ed.). Dictionary of National Biography. Vol. 58. London: Smith, Elder & Co. pp. 304–305.
