= Adam de Welles, 1st Baron Welles =

Coat of arms of Adam de Welles, Lord of Welles, Or, a lion rampant queue forchée sable..

Adam de Welles, 1st Baron Welles (died 1311), Lord of Welles, was an English noble. He fought in the wars in Flanders and Scotland. He was a signatory of the Baron's Letter to Pope Boniface VIII in 1301.

== Biography ==
Adam was the eldest son of William de Welles and Isabel de Periton. He served in Flanders in 1297, and against the Scots from 1299 to 1310. He fought at the Battle of Falkirk on 22 July 1298, and was Constable of Rockingham Castle. Adam was at the siege of Carlaverock in July 1300, and was a signatory of the Barons' Letter to Pope Boniface VIII in 1301. He died in 1311 and was succeeded by his eldest son, Robert.

== Marriage and issue ==
Adam married Joan, the widow of Walter FitzRobert and the daughter of John d'Engaine and Joan de Greinville. They had the following issue:

- Robert de Welles (died 1320), married Maud de Clare, without issue.
- Adam de Welles
- John de Welles
- Margaret de Welles
- Cecily de Welles
- unknown daughter.who married a Mablethorpe
