= Robert Clifford, 3rd Baron Clifford =

Arms of de Clifford: Chequy or and azure, a fesse gules

Robert de Clifford, 3rd Baron de Clifford, also 3rd Lord of Skipton (5 November 1305 – 20 May 1344) was a member of the Clifford family which held the seat of Skipton from 1310 to 1676. He was the second son of Robert de Clifford, 1st Baron de Clifford and Maud de Clare, eldest daughter of Thomas de Clare, Lord of Thomond and Juliana FitzGerald.

King Edward III restored his title to him in 1327 after being forfeited by his elder brother Roger de Clifford, 2nd Baron de Clifford who was attainted and hanged for treason.

He married Isabel, daughter of Maurice de Berkeley, 2nd Baron Berkeley at Berkeley Castle in 1328. They had 7 children. He was succeeded as Baron De Clifford by the eldest son, Robert de Clifford, 4th Baron de Clifford.

Peerage of England
| Preceded by Roger de Clifford, forfeit since 1322 | Baron de Clifford; 1327–1344 | Succeeded by Robert Clifford |
