= Governor Clifford =

Governor Clifford may refer to:

- Bede Clifford (1890–1969), Governor of the Bahamas from 1932 to 1934, Governor of Mauritius from 1937 to 1942, and Governor of Trinidad and Tobago from 1942 to 1947
- Hugh Clifford (colonial administrator) (1866–1941), Governor of North Borneo from 1900 to 1901, Governor of Ceylon in 1907 and from 1925 to 1927, Governor of Gold Coast from 1912 to 1919, Governor of Nigeria from 1919 to 1925, Governor of Straits Settlements from 1927 to 1930
- John H. Clifford (1809–1876), 21st Governor of Massachusetts
- Thomas Clifford, 6th Baron Clifford (1363–1391), Governor of Carlisle Castle
