= Miles Russell, 28th Baron de Clifford =

British peer (born 1966)

The Right Honourable The Lord de Clifford
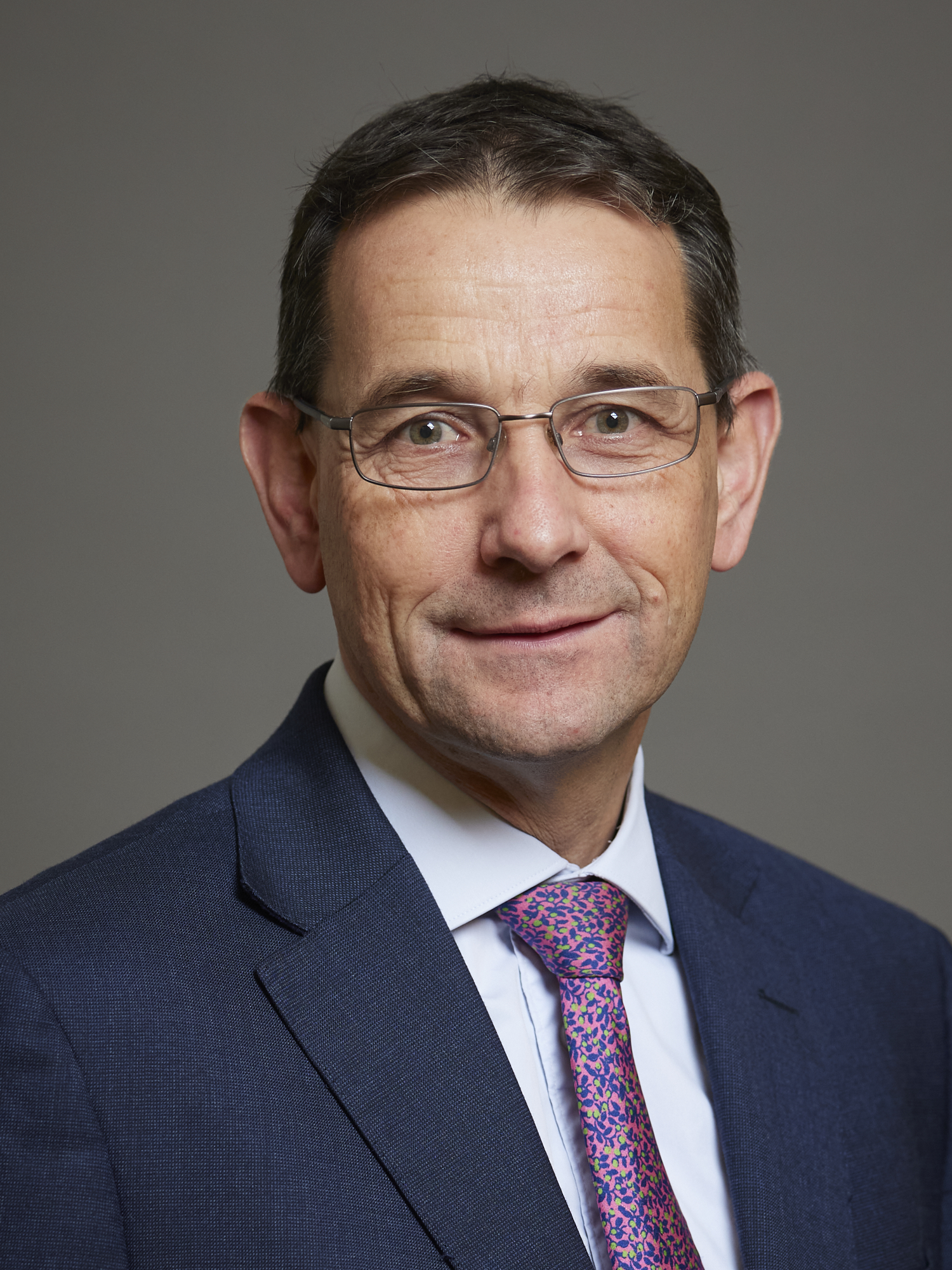
- Official portrait, 2023

Member of the House of Lords
- Lord Temporal
- Elected Hereditary Peer; 26 September 2023 – 29 April 2026
- By-election: 2023
- Preceded by: The 5th Baron Hylton
- Succeeded by: Seat abolished

Personal details
- Born: Miles Edward Southwell Russell; 7 August 1966 (age 60)
- Party: Crossbench
- Relatives: John Russell, 27th Baron de Clifford (uncle); Edward Russell, 26th Baron de Clifford (grandfather)

Arms of de Clifford: Chequy or and azure, a fesse gules

Miles Edward Southwell Russell, 28th Baron de Clifford (born 7 August 1966) is a British hereditary peer, and a former crossbench member of the House of Lords.

== Career ==
Russell was initially an accountant in the agricultural team of Deloitte Touche Accountants, undertaking three years of farm accountancy during his training, before moving to manage the finances of the rural clients and businesses at a Cotswold-based firmed of Chartered Surveyors.

He became Practice Manager at the Wiltshire-based George Veterinary Group in April 2008, and joined the Board of Directors of the Veterinary Management Group in 2016. He became the Director of Finance for the Veterinary Management Group in 2019, and was elected the Group's president for 2023–24 at its annual conference, in Stratford-upon-Avon.

He succeeded to his family title in 2018, on the death of his uncle, John Russell, 27th Baron de Clifford, and was elected to the House of Lords in a Crossbencher by-election in September 2023, taking the place of Raymond, Lord Hylton, who retired earlier that year.

According to his candidature statement, he has expertise in animal welfare, food production, and safety, leadership development, and business management.

== Personal life ==
De Clifford has stated that he has dyslexia.

Parliament of the United Kingdom
Preceded by The Lord Hylton	Elected hereditary peer to the House of Lords under the House of Lords Act 1999; 2023–2026	Position abolished under the House of Lords (Hereditary Peers) Act 2026
Peerage of England
Preceded by John Edward Southwell Russell	Baron de Clifford; 2018–present	Incumbent
