= Eva Carrington =

English actress and model

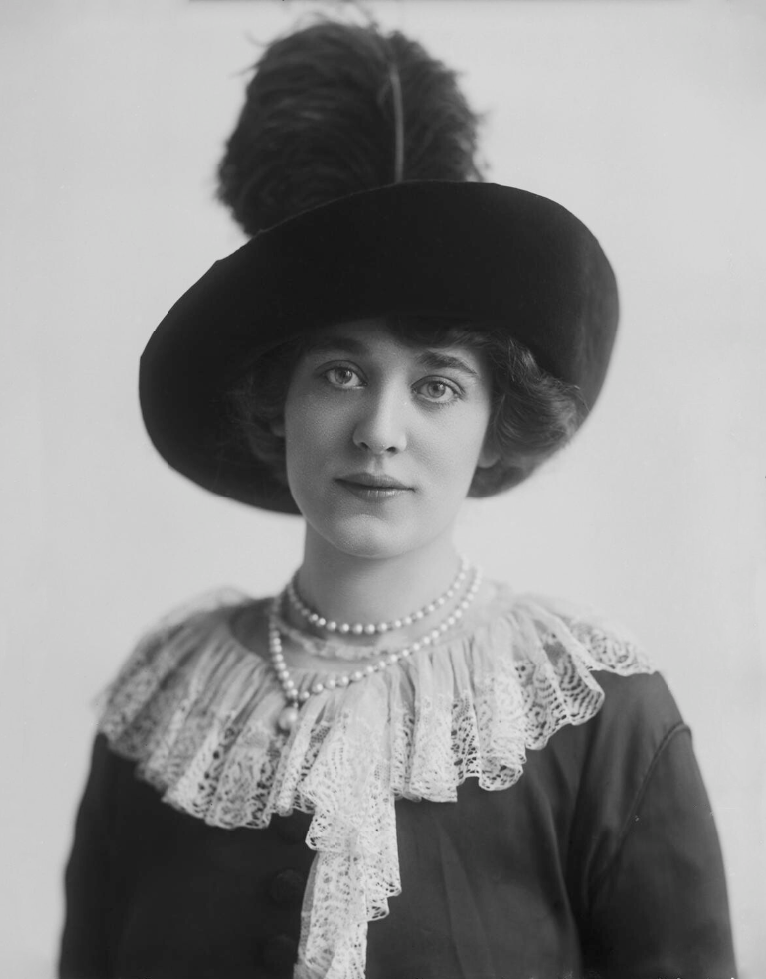
- Carrington in 1913
- Born: Evelyn Victoria Anne Chandler; 1887; Lambeth, London, England
- Died: 25 January 1979 (aged 91–92); London, England
- Other name: Lady de Clifford
- Occupations: Actress; model
- Spouses: Jack Russell, 25th Baron de Clifford (m. 1906; died 1909) Captain Arthur Roy Stock (m. 1913; died 1915) George Vernon Tate (m. 1922; died 1955)
- Children: 5 including Edward Russell, 26th Baron de Clifford

Evelyn Victoria Anne Tate (née Chandler; 1887–1979), known by her stage name Eva Carrington, was an actress, model and sometime peeress as the wife of the Baron de Clifford.

== Early life ==
Carrington was born Evelyn Victoria Anne Chandler in Lambeth, London, the daughter of Anglo-Irish Walter Robert Chandler, a messenger and hall porter at the Walsingham House Hotel, Piccadilly, sometime orderly room clerk to Colonel Fred Burnaby. Her mother, Louisa, was a theatre attendant. By 1891, the family were using "Carrington" as their surname and living in Soho. Her sister, Gladys Winifred Carrington Chandler, married Royal Air Force Flight Lieutenant Christopher Humphrey Tancred (1888–1972), grandson of Sir Thomas Tancred, 7th Baronet, a philanthropist and early colonist of Canterbury, New Zealand; their son was the actor Anthony Tancred (1930–1995).

== Career ==
=== Modeling ===
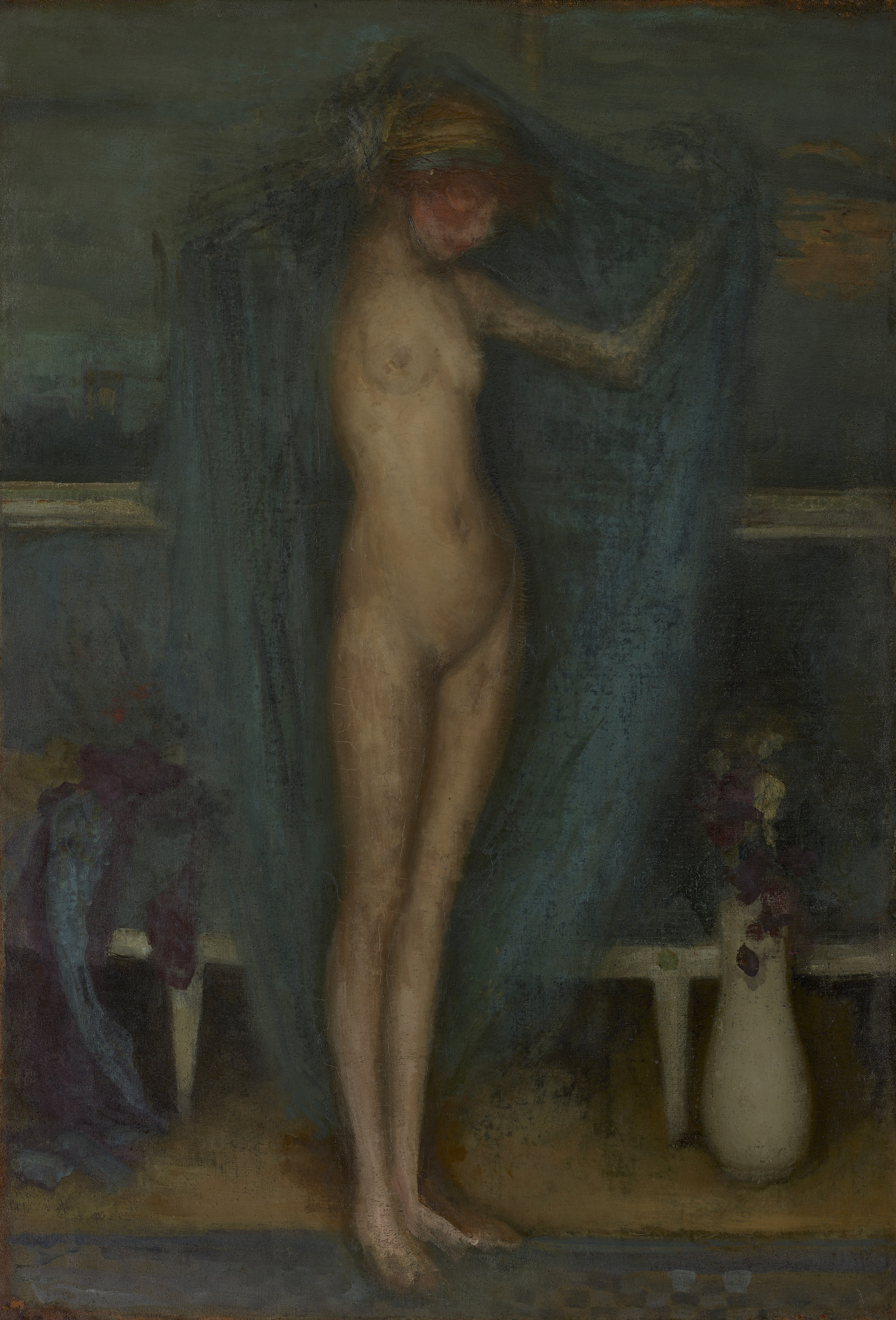
Harmony in Blue and Gold: The Little Blue Girl by Whistler, Carrington modelled for the work in 1901

Carrington was a model for the artist James Whistler between 1898 and 1902. She posed for a number of Whistler's paintings and drawings, including A dancing woman in a pink robe, seen from the back, The Tambourine, Eva and Gladys Carrington seated on a sofa, and The Bead Stringers.

=== Stage ===
She became a renowned actress during the Edwardian period. A famous role was as one of the Gibson Girls in the British theatre performance of The Catch of the Season.

== Personal life ==
Eva married Jack Southwell Russell, 25th Baron de Clifford, in February 1906. She adopted the title Lady de Clifford. This marriage, of a commoner and showgirl to a senior peer, created a scandal at the time.

Following her first husband's death in 1909, she married Captain Arthur Roy Stock of Glenapp Castle, Ayrshire, in 1913; he died in 1915. In 1922, Eva married George Vernon Tate, grandson of the founder of the Tate Gallery.

She had several children, and the only son, the eldest child, Edward Southwell Russell, succeeded to the de Clifford barony. A colour photographic portrait of her and her four daughters by Yevonde taken in 1932 is in the National Portrait Gallery in London.
