= Roger Clifford, 5th Baron Clifford =

Arms of de Clifford: Chequy or and azure, a fesse gules

Roger de Clifford, 5th Baron de Clifford, 9th Lord Clifford, 5th Baron of Westmoreland (10 July 1333 – 13 July 1389), was the son of Robert de Clifford, 3rd Baron de Clifford (d. 20 May 1344), second son of Robert de Clifford, 1st Baron de Clifford (1273–1314), the founder of the northern branch of the family. His mother was Isabella (d. 25 July 1362), daughter of Maurice, 2nd Lord Berkeley. He succeeded his elder brother, Robert de Clifford, 4th Baron de Clifford in 1350, on which day he made proof of his age.

== Life ==
=== Military career ===
Clifford entered on his military career when hardly more than twelve, being armed at the time of Jacob van Artevelde's death on 17 July 1345.

In August 1350 he was engaged in the sea fight with the Spaniards near Winchelsea; and in 1355 he accompanied his father-in-law, Thomas de Beauchamp, 11th Earl of Warwick, on the expedition to Gascony. He again served in Gascony in 1359, 1360, and in the French expedition of the Duke of Lancaster in 1373.

A document dated at Brougham of 10 July 1369 shows him engaging the services of Richard le Fleming and his company for a year. In the same way, he retained Sir Roger de Mowbray; and was himself retained, with his company of nearly eighty men, by Edmund Mortimer, 3rd Earl of March, on 25 September 1379.

On 15 March 1361, he was called upon to assist Lionel, duke of Clarence, in his great Irish expedition on pain of forfeiting his Irish estates. A similar summons to defend his lands in Ireland was issued on 28 July 1368.

His chief services, however, were rendered on the Scottish borders. In July 1370 he was appointed one of the wardens of the west marches; but according to Sir H. Nicolas, he is found defending the northern borders fourteen years earlier. Resigned the truce with Scotland on 24 August 1369, and was warden of both east and west marches on five occasions between 1380 and 1385.

In August 1385 he accompanied Richard II's expedition against Scotland with sixty men-at-arms and forty archers. His last border service seems to have been in October 1388, when he was ordered to adopt measures of defence for the Scotch Marches. In May 1388 he accompanied Richard FitzAlan, 11th Earl of Arundel, in his naval expedition to Brittany.

=== Political Offices ===
He was hereditary High Sheriff of Westmorland from 1350? until his death in 1389. In 1377 he was made High Sheriff of Cumberland and governor of Carlisle, a city whose walls he appears to have inspected and found weak in the preceding year. To the last two offices, he was reappointed on Richard II's accession.

He was made a commissioner of array against the Scots (26 February 1372), and one of a body of commissioners to correct truce-breakers and decide border disputes on 26 May 1373, having sat on a similar commission in September 1367.

=== Parliament ===
Clifford was summoned to all parliaments from 15 December 1356 to 28 July 1388. He was the trier of petitions in many parliaments from November 1373 to September 1377. In August 1374 he was appointed one of the commissioners to settle the dispute between Henry de Percy and William, Earl of Douglas, relative to the possession of Jedworth Forest. In the parliament of November 1381, he was member of a committee to confer with the House of Commons. On 12 October 1386, he gave evidence in the great Scrope and Grosvenor case at St. Margaret's Church, Westminster.

== Death and succession ==
Roger de Clifford died 13 July 1389, being then possessed of enormous estates, chiefly situated in Yorkshire, Northumberland, Cumberland, and Westmoreland, but spread over several other counties. He was succeeded by his son Thomas de Clifford, 6th Baron de Clifford.

== Marriage and issue ==
He married Maud (d. 1403), daughter of Thomas de Beauchamp, 11th Earl of Warwick.

- Thomas de Clifford, 6th Baron de Clifford (d. 1391 ?)
- William Clifford, the Governor of Berwick (d. 1419)
- Margaret, married Sir John Melton, knight
- Katherine, married Ralph, lord Greystock
- Philippa, married William Ferrers, 5th Baron Ferrers of Groby (Lewis, Ancestral Roots, 8th ed. (2006), line 11, no. 34)

Dugdale gives him a third son, the Lollard, Sir Lewis Clifford (d. 1404), whom, however, Sir H. Nicolas shows to have been probably his brother, but certainly not his son

Magna Carta Ancestry by Douglas Richardson lists three sons, including a Roger, with no additional information.

Peerage of England
Preceded by Robert de Clifford	Baron de Clifford; 1350–1389	Succeeded by Thomas de Clifford
