= Roger Clifford, 2nd Baron Clifford =

Arms of de Clifford: Chequy or and azure, a fesse gules

Roger de Clifford, 2nd Baron de Clifford, also 2nd Lord of Skipton (21 January 1300 – 23 March 1322) was a member of the Clifford family, which held the seat of Skipton, Yorkshire, from 1310 to 1676.

Roger inherited his title when his father, Robert de Clifford, 1st Baron de Clifford died at the Battle of Bannockburn in 1314. His mother was Maud de Clare, eldest daughter of Thomas de Clare, Lord of Thomond and Juliana FitzGerald. Roger was also hereditary High Sheriff of Westmorland.

He was involved in a rebellion against King Edward II's favourite Hugh Despenser the Younger, and ultimately against the King himself. He took part in the Siege of Tickhill. The rebel forces were then brought to battle by the King's forces in Boroughbridge in March 1322; during the battle, Roger Clifford received severe wounds. Forced to surrender, he was condemned to death and held captive in York. He was hanged there, probably on 23 March, and his estates forfeited, including Skipton Castle. They were restored to his brother Robert Clifford, 3rd Lord of Skipton in 1327.

Clifford's Tower, the keep of York Castle, may have been named after Roger de Clifford, although the first recorded use of the keep (which was built between 1245 and 1272 for Henry III), was in 1596.

Peerage of England
Preceded by Robert de Clifford	Baron de Clifford; 1314–1322	Succeeded by forfeit until 1327, Robert Clifford
