= Roger de Clifford (died c. 1285) =

English soldier and judge

- Justice in Eyre
- Born: c. 1221
- Died: c. 1285
- Spouses: Hawyse or Avicia Boterell (m. unknown); "The Countess of Lauretania" (m. 1272)
- Issue: Roger de Clifford (died 1282)
- Father: Walter de Clifford
- Mother: Sybil de Ewyas

Roger de Clifford (c. 1221 – c. 1285) was an English soldier and judge.

== Biography ==
=== Early life ===
Roger de Clifford was the son of Roger de Clifford of Tenbury, second son of Walter de Clifford, brother of Fair Rosamond, by Sybil, daughter of Robert de Ewyas, and relict first of Robert, Lord Tregoz, and then of William de Newmarch. He was a minor at the date of his father's death (c. 1231).

In 1259 he was among the suite of Henry III in France during the negotiations for the treaty of peace which was concluded in that year with Louis IX. Three years later suspicions of his loyalty were aroused by a letter which, as representing the marcher barons, he sent to the King urging upon him the observance of the provisions of Oxford, and he was forbidden to joust or appear in arms, particularly during the King's absence overseas, without a royal license. The effect of this injunction was, however, neutralised by a commission issued almost simultaneously, and doubtless at the instance of Henry de Montfort, by which he was placed in command of the royal castles of Ludgershall and Marlborough.

=== Second Barons' War ===
In 1263 Clifford joined the insurgent barons under de Montfort, ravaging the Welsh Marches with Roger de Leybourne and taking Hereford and Bristol, and was excommunicated. The following year he returned to his allegiance and played a prominent part in the siege of Nottingham, taking prisoner Simon de Montfort the Younger. He was rewarded with the command of the castle of Gloucester and the shrievalty of the county, and with the post of Justice of the Royal Forests south of the Trent. He was taken prisoner at the Battle of Lewes, but was among those who were released on condition of appearing in parliament when summoned. The liberty thus gained he employed in raising an army for the King in the Welsh marches, and with Roger de Mortimer succeeded in reducing Gloucester, Bridgnorth, and Marlborough. Cited by the parliament to give an account of his conduct and failing to appear, he was declared an exile.

In the spring of 1265 the timely appearance of a force under the joint command of Clifford and Roger de Leybourne prevented the recapture of Prince Edward, then a fugitive from the castle of Hereford. Clifford also greatly distinguished himself at the Battle of Evesham in August of the same year; it was to him that John Fitz-John, one of the few English supporters of de Montfort who left the field alive, owed his preservation. In recognition of his services the King released him from a debt of 399l. 17s., granted him very extensive estates in Warwickshire and Leicestershire, and put him in possession, jointly with Roger de Leybourne, of certain estates in Westmoreland which had belonged to Robert de Vipont (Veteri Ponte). He obtained (1269–70) the hand of Isabella, Vipont's elder daughter and coheiress, for his son Roger, and Leybourne married her younger sister Idonea. There is evidence, however, that Clifford and Leybourne soon began to quarrel about their respective shares of the property.

=== Lord Edward's Crusade ===
In 1270 Clifford joined the Crusade under Prince Edward, his son Roger being temporarily substituted for him as Justice of the Forests, and he was one of the executors of the will made by the Prince at Acre in 1272, and a witness to the contract executed by Edward at Sordua in Gascony in the following year, by which he agreed to marry his eldest daughter to the eldest son of Peter of Arragon. It was probably in the same year that Clifford married in France a lady who is described by Dugdale as the Countess of Lauretania. The lady died in 1301, and was buried in Worcester Cathedral. Clifford's first wife was probably Hawyse or Avicia, daughter of John Boterell, a grant of whose hand his father had obtained from the King in 1230.

=== Later life ===
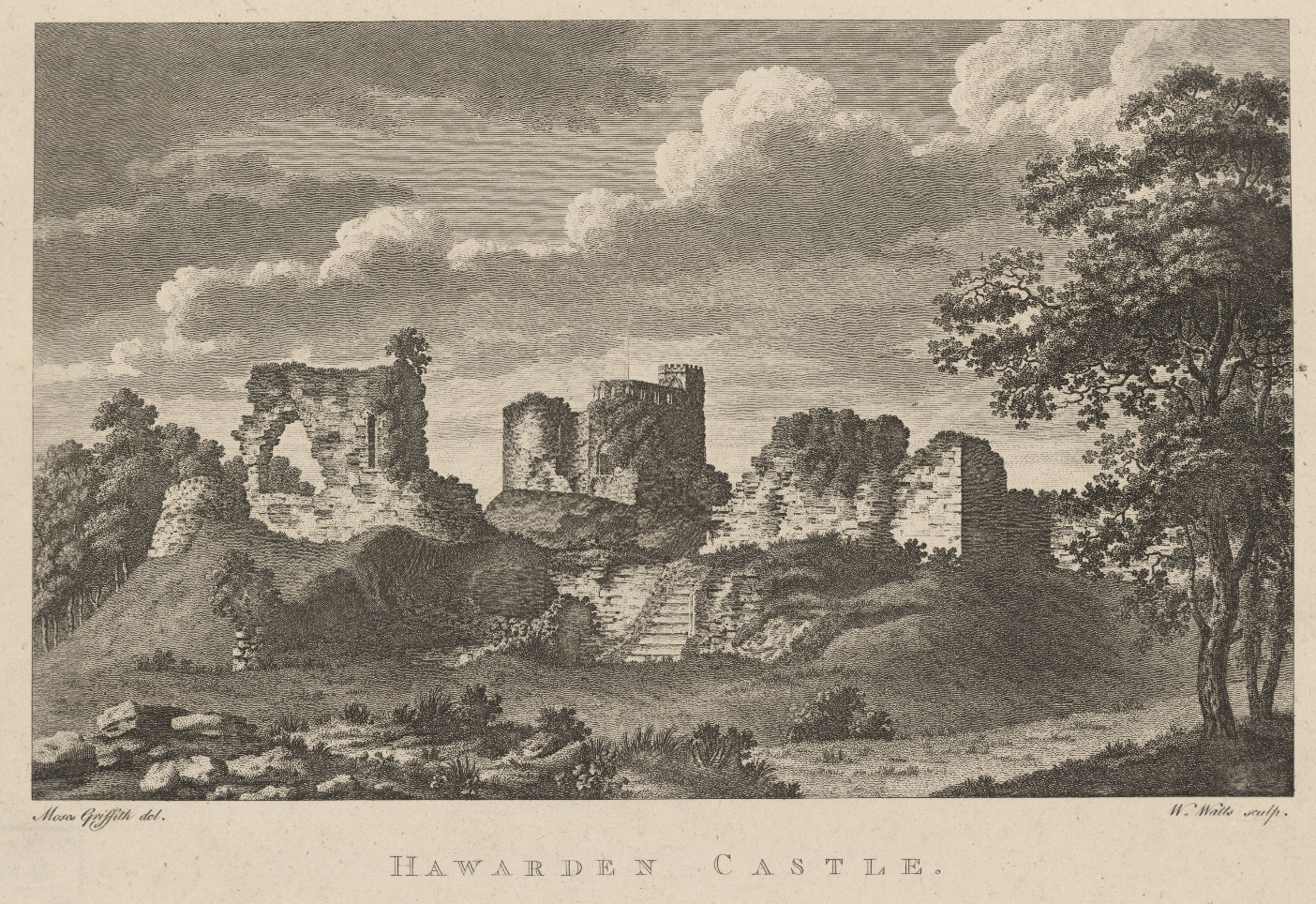
Engraved view of the ruins of Hawarden Castle

On his return to England in 1274 he was at once sent with William de Beauchamp into Wales with a commission to examine into the state of the border and to exact reparation for breaches of the peace. In the autumn of 1275 he was again in France, being commissioned to explain to Philip III Edward's reason for refusing to act as arbitrator in a dispute between the Duke of Burgundy and the Count of Nivernois, which it was desired to refer to him.

He was appointed governor of Erdesleigh in Herefordshire in 1275, and Justice of Wales in 1279, being invested, according to Rishanger, with a jurisdiction extending over the whole of that country. On the outbreak of the last Welsh insurrection he was surprised by David, brother of Llewelyn, in Hawarden Castle on Palm Sunday (22 March 1281–2), the garrison being put to the sword, and taken prisoner, though not before he had been severely (according to one chronicler mortally) wounded. He was carried to Snowdon. In the war which followed his son Roger was drowned on St. Leonard's day (6 November 1282) while crossing a bridge of boats over the Menai Strait, a sudden attack of the Welsh having thrown the English forces into confusion.

Clifford probably died about 1285. His estate being in debt to the Crown, execution was issued on his goods in 1286, the jewels of his widow the countess being exempted by the writ. Before his death he had made over to the city of London certain property which he held in the Jewry.

== Sources ==
- Ypodigma Neustriæ (Rolls Ser.), 153, 155, 158, 173, 510;
- Rishanger (Rolls Ser.), 13, 21, 30–1, 34, 97, 99, 103, (Camden Society) 18, 125;
- Gervase of Canterbury (Rolls Ser.), ii. 221–2, 226, 234, iii. 225, 232, iv. 172, 234–5;
- Annal. Monast. (Rolls Ser.), ii. 107, 109, 376, 397, iii. 292, iv. 459, 481, 485;
- Hoare's Wiltshire, Hd. of Ambresbury, 84;
- Devon's Issues of the Exch. (Hen. III–Hen. VI), p. 93;
- Rot. Fin. (Roberts), ii. 182, 242, 410;
- Cal. Rot. Chart. 92;
- Excerpta e Rot. Fin., i. 219, ii. 520;
- Rot. Hund., i. 186, ii. 140, 270;
- Rymer's Fœdera (2nd edn.), i. 777, 804, (ed. Clarke) i. pt. i. 434, 449, 455, 465, 483, pt. ii. 504, 506, 510, 530, 537, 558, 576, 608;
- Eyton's Shropshire, v. 146, 163;
- Nichols's Leicestershire, i. 178, 181;
- Dugdale's Warwickshire (Thomas), pp. 399, 556, 899, 1009;
- Pierre de Langtoft (Rolls Ser.), ii. 178;
- Eulogium Historiarum (Rolls Ser.), iii. 123, 129, 136, 145;
- Cal. Rot. Pat. 42;
- Parl. Writs, i. 222;
- John de Oxenides (Rolls Ser.), 236;
- Nicolas's Testam. Vetusta, p. 8;
- Mun. Gild. Londin. (Rolls Ser.), i. 555;
- Chron. Edw. I (Rolls Ser.), i. 89;
- Nicolas's Hist. Peerage (Courthope);
- Dugdale's Baronage, i. 135;
- Foss's Judges of England.

== Bibliography ==
- Rigg, James McMullen (1887). "Clifford, Roger de (d.1285?)" . In Stephen, Leslie (ed.). Dictionary of National Biography. Vol. 11. London: Smith, Elder & Co. pp. 72–74.
