= Richard de Clare, Steward of Forest of Essex =

Richard de Clare (after 1281 – 10 May 1318), 1st Lord Clare, was the son of Thomas de Clare, Lord of Thomond and Juliana FitzGerald.

A descendant of Gilbert Fitz Richard de Clare, he succeeded his older brother, Gilbert, in 1308 as Lord of Thomond. In 1309, and then again between 1312 and 1316, he was sheriff of Cork. As part of his duties, he put down a number of rebellions. He was killed while commanding his forces at the Battle of Dysert O'Dea near the modern town of Ennis in County Clare. According to legend, the day before his death, Richard de Clare beheld a woman dressed in white on the river's edge washing bloody clothing and armor. When he asked whose clothes they were, she replied, "yours," and then vanished. This woman was believed to be a banshee foretelling his death. The next day, he lay dead with his clothes caked in blood on the battlefield of Dysert O'Dea.

Richard was succeeded in the lordship by his son Thomas, who was born in 1318 and died three years later. Investigations pursuant to a writ issued on 10 April 1321 established that Thomas' heirs were his father's sisters: Margaret, the wife of Bartholomew de Badlesmere, and Maud, the wife of Sir Robert de Welle. As well as the stewardship of the Forest of Essex, Thomas' estate included numerous properties in Ireland. Thomas de Clare was the last direct male descendant of Rollo, the first ruler of Normandy.
