= Nicholas Seagrave =

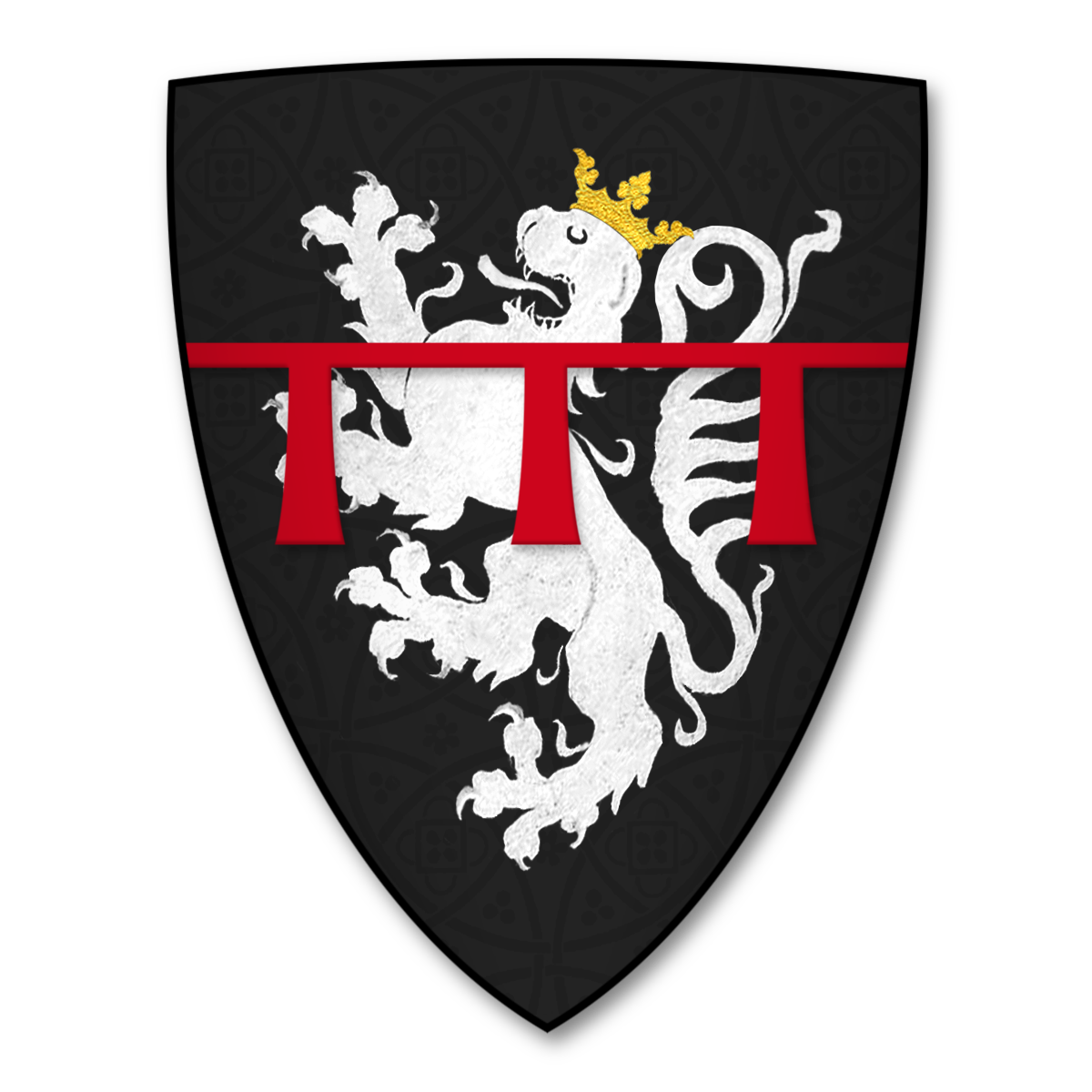
Coat of Arms of Nicholas de Segrave.

Nicholas Seagrave (after 1256 – 25 November 1321), lord of Stowe in Northamptonshire, was Marshal of England from 1308 to 1316. He was the second son of Nicholas of Seagrave, first Baron Seagrave.

Nicholas Seagrave was first summoned to Parliament in 1295 and continued to be summoned until his death. In 1298, he fought in the vanguard at the Battle of Falkirk. In 1300, he was present at the siege of Caerlaverock in the retinue of Henry de Bohun, 1st Earl of Hereford, and in 1301, he sealed the barons' remonstrances to the pope as 'Nicholas de Seagrave, lord of Stow'. In 1301, he became involved in a dispute with Walter Langton, bishop of Lichfield, and in the same year he and his wife Alice were accused with many others of breaking houses belonging to Ralph de Monthermer, 1st Baron Monthermer. In the Scottish campaign of 1303-4, he became involved in another dispute, and when he was refused trial by combat he deserted the army to flee to France. On his return in 1305, he was apparently sentenced to death but soon pardoned and restored to favour by King Edward I.

He was one of Edward II's strongest supporters at the start of his reign, and in 1308, he was appointed Lord Marshal. However, he was an adherent of Thomas, 2nd Earl of Lancaster, who became a leader of the opposition to the king. This made Seagrave's position at court increasingly untenable, and he was replaced in 1316. He died on 25 November 1321.

== Coat of arms ==
His coat of arms — sable a lion rampant argent crowned or a label gules - appears on the following rolls of arms which verify his presence on the Scottish campaigns mentioned above: The Falkirk Roll (together with his eldest brother John); The Caerlaverock Poem (again with John); and The Stirling Roll (with brothers John, Henry, Simon and nephew Stephen). Of course, his arms are differenced from those of his eldest brother.

Preceded by Robert de Clifford	Lord Marshal; 1308-1316	Succeeded by Thomas of Brotherton
