= Jack Russell, 25th Baron de Clifford =

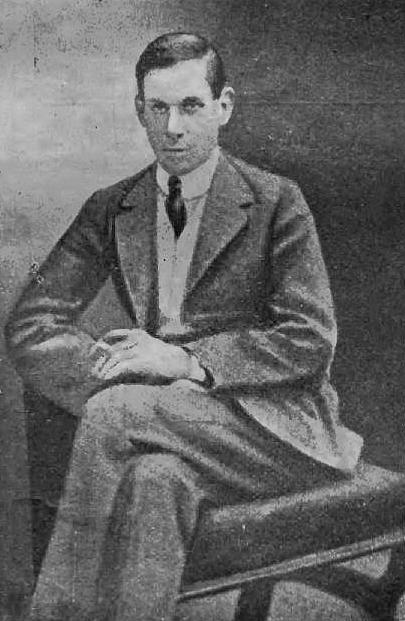
Baron de Clifford (before 1906)

Jack Southwell Russell, 25th Baron de Clifford (2 July 1884 – 1 September 1909) was a British army officer and nobleman.

== Family and succession ==
He was the only son of Edward Southwell Russell, 24th Baron de Clifford, and Hilda Balfour, and succeeded to the barony on the death of his father on 6 April 1894.

== Military career ==
Lord de Clifford was commissioned as a second lieutenant in the Shropshire Imperial Yeomanry on 19 March 1902.

== Marriage and death ==
He married the actress Evelyn Victoria Anne Chandler, known as Eva Carrington, on 16 February 1906 at the St. Pancras Registry Office.

He died on 1 September 1909 aged 25, following a car accident at Small Dole, Bramber, Sussex, England, and was succeeded by his son Edward Southwell Russell.

Peerage of England
Preceded by Edward Southwell Russell	Baron de Clifford; 1894–1909	Succeeded by Edward Southwell Russell
