= Robert Clifford, 4th Baron Clifford =

Arms of de Clifford: Chequy or and azure, a fesse gules

Robert Clifford, 4th Baron de Clifford (born between 1328 and 1331 – 1350) and lord of the honour of Skipton Craven was a member of the Clifford family in fourteenth-century England.

He was the son and heir of Robert, the third Baron and was aged somewhere between thirteen and sixteen on his father's death in 1344. Young Robert married into the Neville family in April 1343 when he wed Euphemia, daughter of Ralph, Lord of Raby, in whose wardship Clifford had been placed.

He died in France without heirs, and without ever having come of age, in 1350. Euphemia remarried within two years, to a son of Thomas, Lord Lucy, and lived until November 1393.

He was succeeded by his brother Roger de Clifford, 5th Baron de Clifford.

Peerage of England
Preceded by Robert de Clifford	Baron de Clifford; 1344–1350	Succeeded by Roger de Clifford
