= Robert Clifford, 1st Baron Clifford =

13th and 14th-century English nobleman, sheriff, and baron

Robert de Clifford
- Baron de Clifford
- Arms of Clifford: Chequy or and azure, a fesse gules, recorded by the heralds as having been borne by him in the Caerlaverock Roll of 1300
- Tenure: 1299 – 24 June 1314
- Successor: Roger de Clifford, 2nd Baron de Clifford
- Other titles: Lord of Skipton
- Born: 1 April 1274; Clifford Castle, Herefordshire, England.
- Died: 24 June 1314 (Died at the Battle of Bannockburn); Bannockburn, Stirlingshire, Scotland.
- Residence: Appleby Castle; Brougham Castle; Skipton Castle
- Spouse: Maud de Clare
- Issue: Roger de Clifford, 2nd Baron de Clifford; Idonia de Clifford, Baroness Percy; Robert de Clifford, 3rd Baron de Clifford; Margaret de Clifford, Lady Mauley
- Parents: Roger de Clifford; Isabella de Vipont

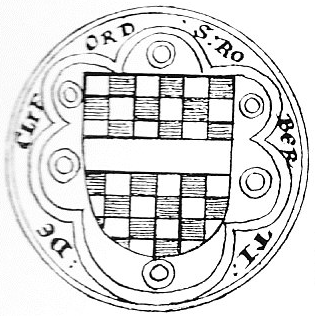
Seal of Robert de Clifford, 1st Baron de Clifford (c.1274–1314) affixed to the 1301 Barons' Letter to the Pope, in the Latin text of which he is described as Robertus de Clifford, Castellanus de Appelby ("Constable of Appleby Castle"). Legend: S(igillum) Roberti de Cliford ("Seal of Robert de Clifford"). Arms: Chequy or and azure, a fesse gules

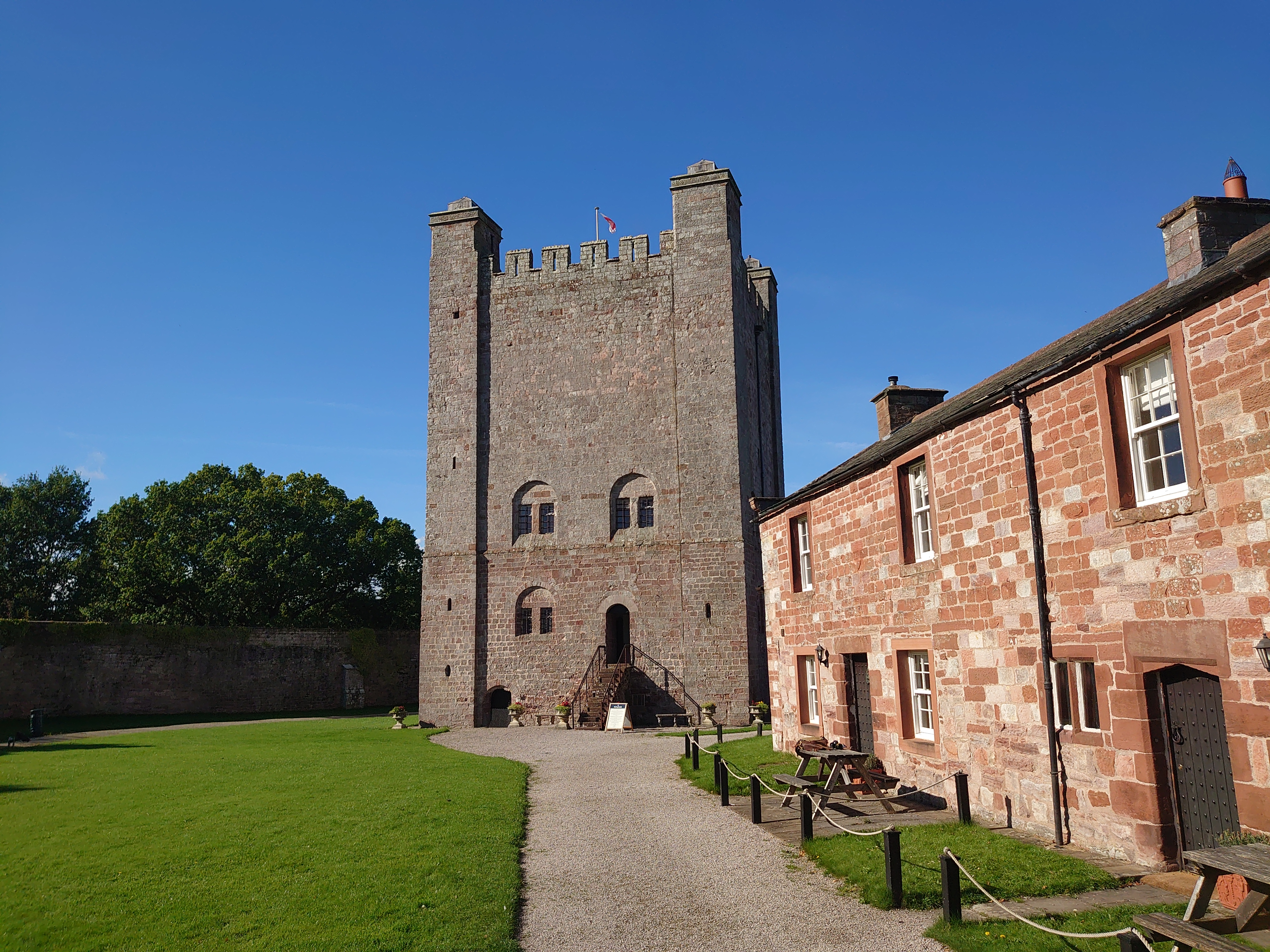
Caesar's Tower, 12th century keep of Appleby Castle, seat of Robert de Clifford

Robert de Clifford, 1st Baron de Clifford (1 April 1274 – 24 June 1314), of Appleby Castle, Westmorland, feudal baron of Appleby and feudal baron of Skipton in Yorkshire, was an English soldier who became 1st Lord Warden of the Marches, responsible for defending the English border with Scotland.

== Origins ==
He was born at Clifford Castle, Herefordshire, a son of Roger de Clifford (died 1282), himself a grandson of Walter II de Clifford (died 1221), feudal baron of Clifford, by his wife Isabella de Vipont (died 1291), one of the two daughters and co-heiresses of Robert II de Vipont (died 1264), feudal baron of Appleby, grandson of Robert I de Vieuxpont (died 1227/8). Thenceforth the Clifford family quartered the arms of Vipont: Gules, six annulets or.

== Inheritances ==
As his father had predeceased his own father, in 1286, Robert inherited the estates of his grandfather, Roger I de Clifford (d.1286). Following the death of his mother, Isabella de Vipont, in 1291, he inherited a one-half moiety of the extensive Vipont feudal barony of Appleby in Westmorland, including Appleby Castle and Brougham Castle. During the outbreak of the Wars of Scottish Independence, in 1296, Brougham Castle became an important military base for Robert, and in 1300, King Edward I of England visited there. In 1308, Robert was granted the remaining moiety of the barony of Appleby, by his childless aunt Idonea de Vipont (d.1333), and thus became one of the most powerful barons in England.

== Career ==
During the reigns of the English Kings, Edward I and Edward II, Clifford was a prominent soldier. In 1296, he was sent with Henry de Percy, 1st Baron Percy to quell the Scots who asked for terms of surrender at Irvine. He was then appointed Governor of Carlisle. During the reign of King Edward I, he was styled Warden of the Marches, and during the reign of King Edward II, as Lord Warden of the Marches, being the first holder of this office. In 1298, he fought for King Edward I at the Battle of Falkirk, in which William Wallace was defeated, for which he was rewarded with Governorship of Nottingham Castle. In 1299, he was created Baron de Clifford by writ and summoned to Parliament. He won great renown at the Siege of Caerlaverock Castle, in 1300, during which his armorials (Chequy or and azure, a fesse gules) were recorded by the heralds on the famous Caerlaverock Roll or Poem, which read (translated from French): "Strength from wisdom drawing, Robert Lord de Clifford's mind is bent on his enemies' subjection. Through his mother his descent comes from that renowned Earl Marshal at Constantinople, said to have battled with a unicorn and struck the monster dead. All the merits of his grandsire, Roger, still in Robert spring. Of no praise is he unworthy; wiser none was with the King. Honoured was his banner, checky gold and blue, a scarlet fess. Were I maiden, heart and body I would yield to such noblesse!" Clifford was one of many who sealed the 1301 Barons' Letter to the Pope, in the Latin text of which he is described as Robertus de Clifford, Castellanus de Appelby ("Constable of Appleby Castle"). After the death of King Edward I, in 1307, he was appointed counsellor to his son, King Edward II, together with Henry de Lacy, 3rd Earl of Lincoln, the Earl of Warwick, and the Earl of Pembroke. In the same year of 1307, the new King appointed him Marshal of England, and in this capacity, he probably organised Edward II's coronation on 25 February 1308. On 12 March 1308, he was relieved of the marshalcy, the custodianship of Nottingham Castle, and of his Forest justiceship, but on 20 August 1308, he was appointed captain and chief guardian of Scotland. In 1310, King Edward II granted him Skipton Castle, and he was created Lord of Skipton, being given the feudal barony of Skipton in Yorkshire, held until that date by Earl Henry de Lacy (1251–1311). Henry had married Margaret Longespée, Clifford's cousin and heiress of the feudal barony of Clifford, which had descended in the female line from Clifford's great-great-uncle, Walter II de Clifford (d.1263), Margaret's maternal grandfather. Skipton Castle would later become the principal seat of the Clifford family until 1676.

In 1312, together with Thomas Crouchback, 2nd Earl of Lancaster, he took part in the movement against Piers Gaveston, King Edward II's favourite, whom he besieged at Scarborough Castle.

Robert de Clifford died fighting at the Battle of Bannockburn on 24 June 1314. He was killed in a cavalry charge against Scottish spearmen on the second and main day of battle.

== Marriage and children ==
In 1295, at Clifford Castle, he married Maud de Clare, eldest daughter of Thomas de Clare, Lord of Thomond and Juliana FitzGerald. By Maud, he had four children:

- Roger de Clifford, 2nd Baron de Clifford (b. 21 January 1300)
- Idoine (Idonia or Idonea) de Clifford (b. c.1303), married Henry de Percy, 2nd Baron Percy.
- Robert de Clifford, 3rd Baron de Clifford (b. 5 November 1305)
- Margaret de Clifford (b.1307), married as her second husband, Piers de Mauley, 5th Lord Mauley (1300–1355).

== Death and burial ==
Clifford was killed on 24 June 1314 fighting at the Battle of Bannockburn and was buried at Shap Abbey in Westmoreland.

Peerage of England
New creation	Baron de Clifford; 1299–1314	Succeeded by Roger de Clifford
Political offices
Preceded by Roger Bigod	Lord Marshal; 1307–1308	Succeeded by Nicholas Seagrave
