= John Russell, 27th Baron de Clifford =

British nobleman

John Edward Southwell Russell, 27th Baron de Clifford (8 June 1928 – 2 November 2018) was Lord de Clifford in the Peerage of England.

== Family ==
Lord de Clifford was the son of Lieutenant-Colonel Edward Russell, 26th Baron de Clifford and Dorothy Evelyn (Meyrick).

Lord de Clifford married Bridget Jennifer Robertson, daughter of Duncan Robertson and Joyce Williams-Wynn, on 27 June 1959. They had no children.

== Education ==
Lord de Clifford received his early education at Eton College, Windsor. He was later educated at the Royal Agricultural College.

Portraits exist from this period, from 1939 and 1948, now held by the National Portrait Gallery, London.

== Succession ==
He became the 27th Lord de Clifford on 3 January 1982.

He died on 2 November 2018 at the age of 90. As he had no children, his heir was his nephew, Miles Edward Southwell Russell (b. 1966).

Peerage of England
Preceded by Edward Russell	Baron de Clifford; 1982–2018	Succeeded by Miles Russell
