= Edward Russell, 26th Baron de Clifford =

British Army officer (1907–1982)

Lieutenant Colonel Edward Southwell Russell, 26th Baron de Clifford, OBE, TD (31 January 1907 – 3 January 1982), was the only son of Jack Southwell Russell, 25th Baron de Clifford, and Eva Carrington.

In 1935 he became the last peer to be tried in the House of Lords for a felony, manslaughter, the result of a traffic collision. He was found not guilty. He lost his father to a road accident; in his maiden speech in 1928 in the House of Lords he called for mandatory driving tests. Later he spoke in favour of speed limits; both of these measures were introduced in 1934. He was one of four peers to have at times before 1945 supported Sir Oswald Mosley and his British Union of Fascists.

== Early life ==
Russell was born in Belgravia, London, educated at Eton College and studied engineering at Imperial College London. In 1926 he was commissioned into the 21st (Royal Gloucestershire Hussars) Armoured Car Company of the Territorial Army; he was promoted lieutenant in 1929 and captain in 1938. His hobby until 1935 was racing cars, and he was a young supporter of fascist Sir Oswald Mosley and his British Union of Fascists.

In 1926 in Marylebone, he married Dorothy Evelyn Meyrick, daughter of 43 Club owner Kate Meyrick. Since he was nineteen, the law at the time required him to have his mother's consent to the marriage, which he knew he could not obtain due to his fiancée's association with the West End. He, therefore, lied about his age claiming to be 21, for which he was fined £50 by the Lord Mayor of London in the magistrates' court.

In 1928 he made his maiden speech in the House of Lords, on the subject of road safety, in which he proposed introducing mandatory driving tests for anyone applying for a driving licence. During his career in the House, he also argued for speed limits to be imposed. (Both measures were introduced by the Road Traffic Act 1934.)

== Racing driver ==
De Clifford took part in the 1934 24 Hours of Le Mans, in a Lagonda Rapier which he had modified to such an extent that he considered it appropriate to name it the De Clifford Special. Teamed with Charles Brackenbury, he finished 16th. De Clifford took two caravans to the race, one for himself and one for his butler.

== Trial in the House of Lords ==
On 15 August 1935, Lord de Clifford was involved in a high-speed head-on collision which caused him injury and killed a 26-year-old driver in Surrey, Douglas George Hopkins, while driving his sports car on the wrong side of the road. When a jury in the coroner's court found unanimously that an 'accident involving others' was the cause of death, and that he had been well beyond the speed limit, the police charged him with manslaughter, a felony. At first he was indicted and committed for trial at the Old Bailey, until it dawned on the courts that, as he was a peer of the realm, only the House of Lords could try him for a felony. Since this had not occurred since 1901, when The 2nd Earl Russell was convicted of bigamy, the House set up a select committee to investigate the precedents and rules for such a proceeding.

The trial commenced on 12 December, with the Lord Chancellor, Lord Hailsham, presiding, in the capacity of Lord High Steward appointed by the Crown for the occasion. The Attorney General prosecuted the case. Admission to the public was by ticket only. This was to be the last ever trial in the House of Lords, since the right of peers to be tried by their peers for felonies was abolished by the Criminal Justice Act 1948. (The House still has the power to try impeachments.)

Lord de Clifford's defence was that Hopkins's vehicle had been travelling at excessive speed on the wrong side and that de Clifford had been compelled to switch lanes at the last moment to avoid a collision, only for the other vehicle to do the same. This defence was successful and he was acquitted.

Lord de Clifford still faced another charge of dangerous driving, which was not a felony and therefore could not be tried in the House. He was due to be tried in the Old Bailey in January. However, in view of his acquittal, the prosecution abandoned their case and a verdict of not guilty was entered.

He made no more speeches in the House of Lords for nearly forty years.

== Life after the trial ==
In 1936 he sued The Spectator for libel, settling out of court. He was named as a co-respondent in a divorce petition. Whether this was true or false, his own marriage survived.

Following his trial in the House of Lords, de Clifford gave up racing cars. During the Second World War he transferred to the Royal Army Ordnance Corps in 1942 and the Royal Electrical and Mechanical Engineers in 1943. In 1946, having reached the rank of lieutenant colonel, he joined the regular army. He was appointed Officer of the Order of the British Empire (OBE) in the 1955 New Year Honours.

Having separated from his wife after the war, he divorced her in 1973 and married Mina Margaret, daughter of Mr G. E. Sands, the same year.

Lord de Clifford, whose last home was in Silvington, Shropshire, died in 1982 aged 74 and was survived by his second wife and two sons by his first wife. He was succeeded in the barony by his elder son, John Edward.

== See also ==
- Henry Dundas, 1st Viscount Melville, the last person to be tried in the House of Lords on impeachment.
- List of trials of peers in the House of Lords

Peerage of England
Preceded by Jack Southwell Russell	Baron de Clifford; 1909–1982	Succeeded by John Edward Southwell Russell
