= Thomas Clifford, 6th Baron Clifford =

Arms of de Clifford: Chequy or and azure, a fesse gules

Thomas de Clifford, 6th Baron de Clifford, also 6th Lord of Skipton (c. 1363 – 1391) was a Knight of The Chamber, hereditary Sheriff of Westmorland, Governor of Carlisle Castle, and Warden of the West Marches.

== Life ==
He was the son of Roger de Clifford, 5th Baron de Clifford. According to Dugdale, he was a knight of the king's chamber in 8 Richard II (1384-5). On 25 June 1386, Northampton, the herald, was allowed to carry a challenge from 'Thomas de Clifford, chivaler l'eisne Fitz-Rogeri, Sire de Clifford,' to Sir Bursigande, eldest son of 'le Sire Bursigande,' in France. According to Dugdale, Sir Thomas crossed the sea for this tournament in the following May. Rymer has preserved a document, dated 28 January 1387, in which the king licenses 'our very dear and loyal knight, Sir Thomas Clifford, to perform all manner of feats of arms' on the Scotch borders.

He inherited his estates and titles on his father's death in 1380. He and two other English knights challenged three French knights to a tourney in the marches between Boulogne and Calais; and on 20 June 1390, he procured safe conduct through England for William de Douglas, who was coming to the English court with forty knights to a wager of battle with Clifford with reference to certain disputed lands.

In 1384, he was granted the custody of Carlisle Castle for life jointly with John Neville, and in 1386 was appointed a warden of the west march. In September 1388, he was master of the king's horses. He was summoned to Parliament by Writ from 6 December 1389. He was hereditary High Sheriff of Westmorland from 1389 until his own death in 1391. His name occurs in the council minutes for 28 April 1390; and according to Dugdale, he received summonses to parliament in 1390-2.

In 1391, Clifford was in the Baltic, and became involved in a brawl with Sir William Douglas, an illegitimate son of the earl of Douglas, in which Douglas was killed. Clifford, overcome by remorse, set off for Jerusalem and died in 1391 on an unidentified Mediterranean island. Dugdale gives the date of his death as 18 August 1391.

== Family ==
He married before 1379 Elizabeth (died March 1424), daughter of Thomas de Ros, 4th Baron de Ros of Helmesley, by Beatrice, daughter of Ralph de Stafford, 1st Earl of Stafford, KG, by whom he had issue. He was succeeded by his eldest son John Clifford, 7th Baron de Clifford.

Lord Clifford is often styled in documents "King's kinsman".

== Issue ==
- John Clifford, 7th Baron de Clifford, married Lady Elizabeth Percy, daughter of Henry 'Hotspur' Percy by Elizabeth, daughter of Edmund Mortimer, 3rd Earl of March.
- Maud Clifford married 1) John Neville, 6th Baron Latimer; 2) Richard of Conisburgh, 3rd Earl of Cambridge

== Sources ==
- Richardson, Douglas, Plantagenet Ancestry, Baltimore Md., 2004, p. 216. ISBN 0-8063-1750-7
- Summerson, Henry (2004). "Clifford, Thomas". Oxford Dictionary of National Biography (online ed.). Oxford University Press. doi:10.1093/ref:odnb/5662. (Subscription, Wikipedia Library access or UK public library membership required.)

Peerage of England
Preceded by Roger de Clifford	Baron de Clifford; 1389–1391	Succeeded by John Clifford
