= Maud de Clare =

English noblewoman (1276–1327)

- Baroness de Clifford; Lady Welle
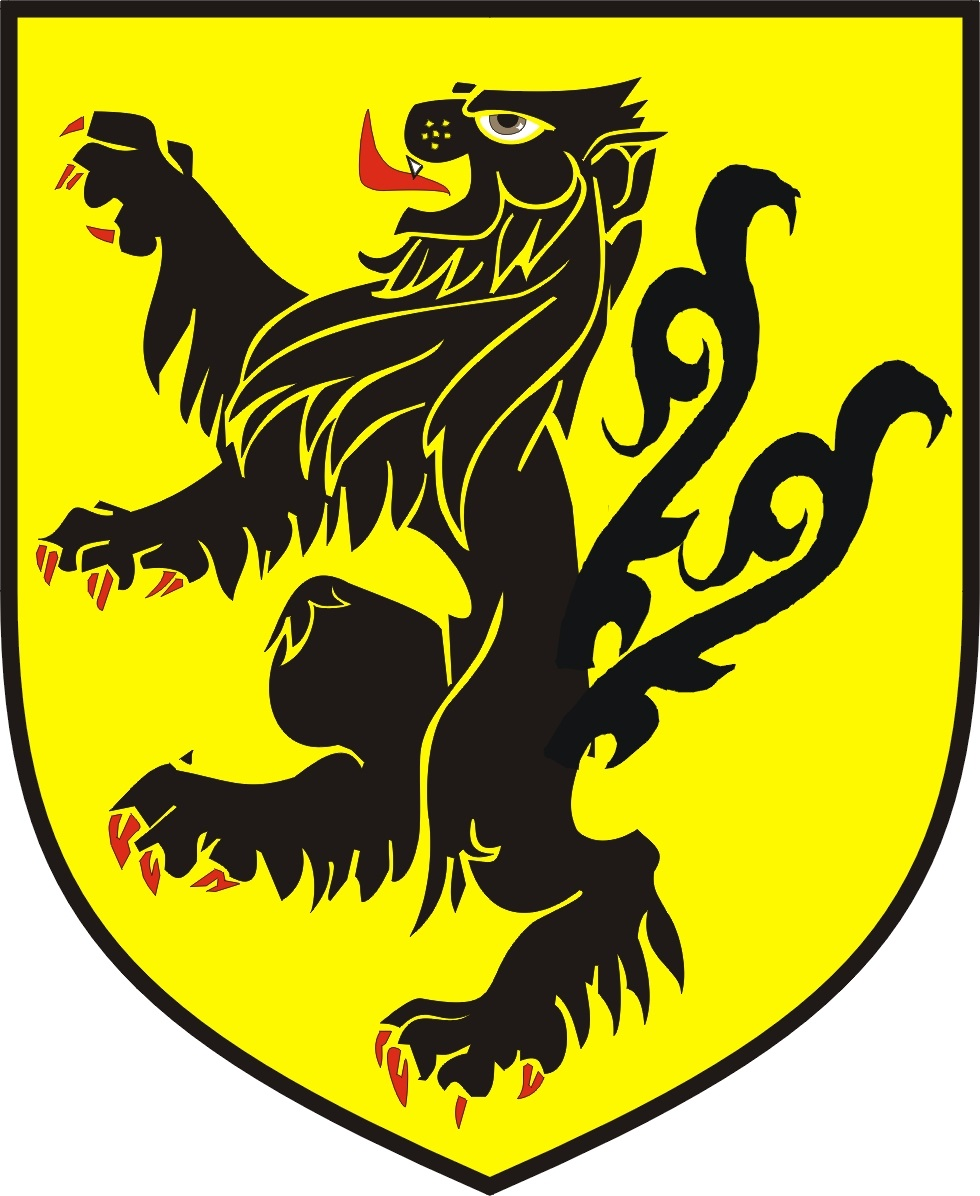
- Arms of the de Welles Family
- Born: 1276; Tewkesbury, Tewkesbury Hundred, Gloucestershire, England
- Died: 4 May 1327 (aged 50–51); Badlesmere, Faversham Hundred, Lathe of Scray, Kent, England
- Family: de Clare
- Spouse: Robert de Clifford, 1st Baron de Clifford; Sir Robert de Welle
- Issue: Roger de Clifford, 2nd Baron de Clifford; Robert de Clifford, 3rd Baron de Clifford; Idonia de Clifford, Baroness de Percy
- Father: Thomas de Clare, Lord of Thomond
- Mother: Juliana FitzGerald of Offaly

Maud de Clare, Baroness de Welles (c.1276 - 4 May 1327), was the eldest daughter of Thomas de Clare, Lord of Inchiquin and Youghal, and Juliana FitzGerald. She married twice, her first marriage was to Robert de Clifford, 1st Baron de Clifford, and her second marriage was to Sir Robert de Welle, Constable of Pendragon Castle. After their deaths, Maud moved to Badlesmere to be near her sister, Margaret de Clare, Baroness Badlesmere and died in Badlesmere in 1327.

== Life ==
Maud was born in 1276 in Tewkesbury, Tewkesbury Hundred, Gloucestershire, England the eldest daughter of Thomas de Clare, Lord of Inchiquin and Youghal, Lord of Thomond, Lord of Bunratty Castle and Juliana FitzGerald. She married Robert de Clifford, 1st Baron de Clifford on 3 November 1295. In 1314 at the Battle of Bannockburn, Maud's husband Robert de Clifford was killed.

Her second marriage to Sir Robert de Welle was done without royal licence and this angered the King of England. She was initially the co-heiress to her nephew's estates along with her sister, Margaret de Clare, Baroness Badlesmere, before the King issued the estates to Lord de Clare's three sisters. Some say this is due to the fact that she married Lord de Welles without royal licence. Maud de Clare and her Sister Margaret were the next heirs of their father's estate which included the Stewardship of the Forest of Essex, the town and castle at Thomond and numerous other properties in Ireland.

== Marriage and issue ==
Maud married Robert de Clifford. They had:

- Roger de Clifford, 2nd Baron de Clifford
- Robert de Clifford, 3rd Baron de Clifford
- Idonia de Clifford, Baroness de Percy

After her husband Robert's death at the battle of Bannockburn, Maud married Sir Robert de Welle, Constable of Pendragon Castle on 16 Nov 1315. They had no children.

== Sources ==
- Altschul, Michael (1965). A Baronial Family in Medieval England: The Clares, 1217–1314. The Johns Hopkins Press.
- King, A. (2001). "Jack Le Irish and the Abduction of Lady Clifford, November 1315; The Heiress and the Irishman". Northern History. 38(2): 187–195.
