= Walter de Clifford (died 1263) =

Original arms of de Clifford, adopted at start of the age of heraldry, c. 1200 – 1215: Chequy or and azure a bend gules.

Walter de Clifford (died 1263) feudal baron of Clifford in Herefordshire, was a Welsh Marcher Lord during the reign of King John (1199–1216).

== Family ==
Walter de Clifford was born before 1190, the son of Walter de Clifford (died 1221) and Agnes Cundy (de Condet). He died before 20 December 1263. He had at least four brothers, Roger, Giles, Richard and Simon, as well as sisters, Maud, Basilia and Cecilia.

== History ==
He took over Clifford barony in 1208 on the disgrace of his father, who appeared disloyal to King John of England who was then in dispute with Walter's lord for Bronllys, William de Braose, 4th Lord of Bramber.

Walter's first marriage proved barren and he married Margaret, the daughter of Prince Llywelyn ab Iorwerth, late in life during 1232 following the accidental death of her first husband, John de Braose. During baronial discontent he rebelled against King Henry III in 1233 and surrendered after Clifford Castle had been reduced by the king. He then joined the king, defending Bronllys Castle in a war against his father-in-law, Llywelyn ab Iorwerth who was at the time besieging nearby Brecon. Twenty years later he nearly rebelled again in a dispute with the king over his Marcher franchises during which he forced a royal messenger to eat a royal writ, which included the wax seal.

With Margaret he left one daughter, Maud, as his sole heiress. She married firstly William Longespée, grandson of the 3rd Earl of Salisbury, and secondly John Giffard of Brimsfield.
