= Baron de Clifford =

Title in the Peerage of England

Barony de Clifford
- Arms of Russell, Barons de Clifford: Argent, a Lion Rampant Gules, on a Chief Sable three Escallops of the first
- Creation date: 1299 (disputed 1605-1678, abeyant 1721-34, 1775-76, 1832-33)
- Created by: Edward I Charles II (terminated abeyance); George II (terminated abeyance); George III (terminated abeyance); William IV (terminated abeyance)
- Peerage: Peerage of England
- First holder: Robert de Clifford, 1st Baron de Clifford
- Present holder: Miles Russell, 28th Baron de Clifford
- Heir apparent: Edward Russell
- Remainder to: Heirs of the body, lawfully begotten
- Former seats: Appleby Castle; Skipton Castle; Brougham Castle
- Motto: CHE SERA SERA (What will be, will be)

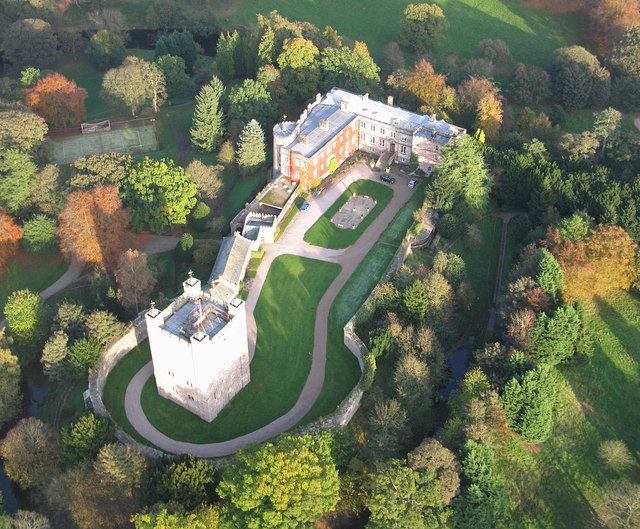
Appleby Castle, Westmorland, ancient caput of the feudal barony of Appleby and seat of the Barons de Clifford

Baron de Clifford is a title in the Peerage of England. It was created in 1299 for Robert de Clifford (c. 1274–1314), feudal baron of Clifford in Herefordshire, feudal baron of Skipton in Yorkshire and feudal baron of Appleby in Westmoreland. The title was created by writ, which means that it can descend through both male and female lines. The Norman family which later took the name de Clifford settled in England after the Norman Conquest of 1066 and was first seated in England at Clifford Castle in Herefordshire. The first Baron served as Earl Marshal of England but was killed at the Battle of Bannockburn in 1314. His 8th generation descendant the 11th Baron, was created Earl of Cumberland in 1525, whose grandson the 3rd Earl was a noted naval commander. On the latter's death in 1605, the earldom passed to his younger brother, the 4th Earl (see the Earl of Cumberland for later history of this title).

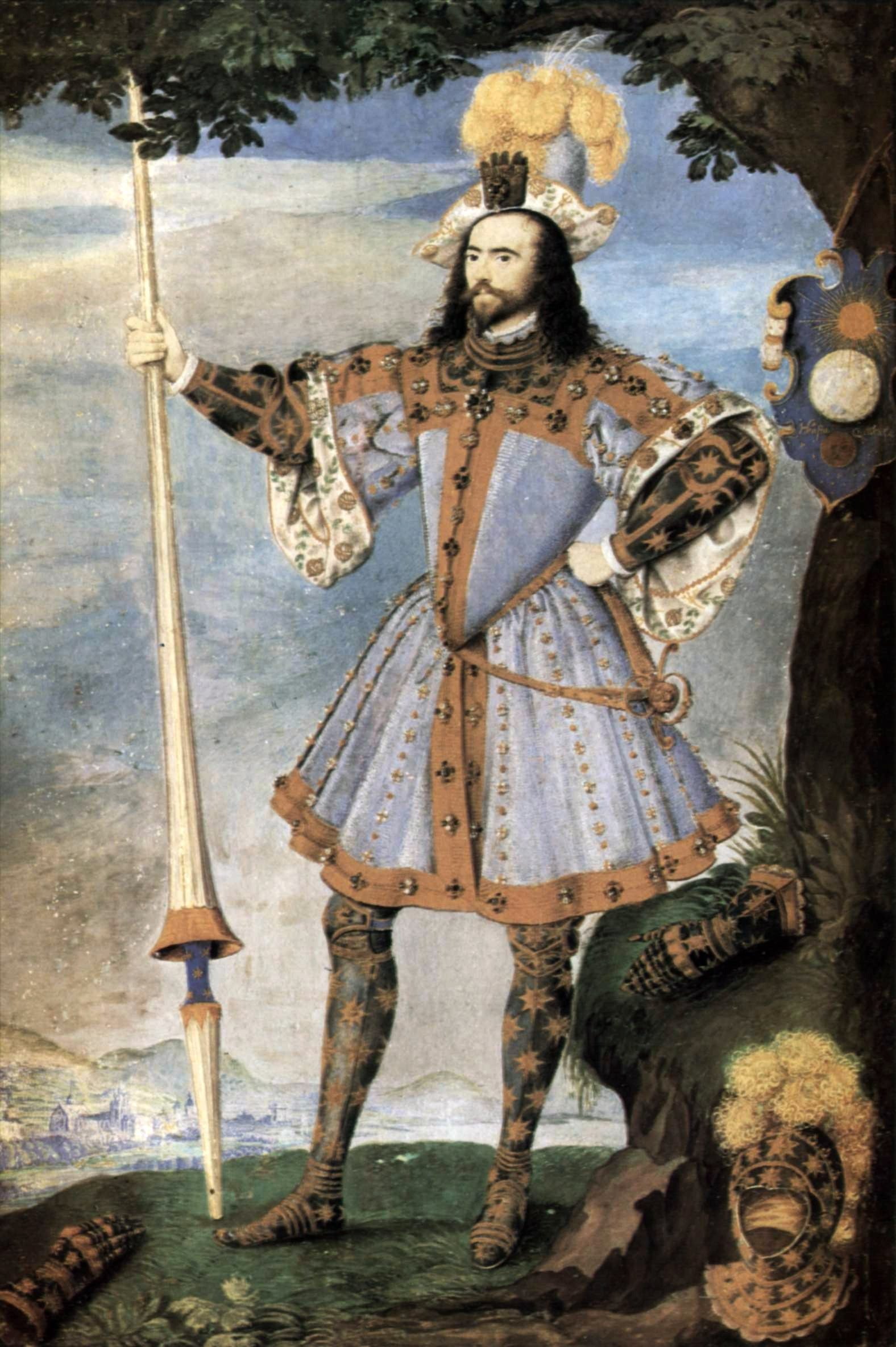
George Clifford, 3rd Earl of Cumberland, 13th Baron de Clifford

The barony of de Clifford was claimed in 1628 by his daughter and only child, Lady Anne Clifford, but the House of Lords postponed the hearing. The barony remained dormant until 1678, when Nicholas Tufton, 3rd Earl of Thanet, was allowed to claim the peerage and became the fifteenth Baron de Clifford. He was the son of Lady Margaret Sackville, daughter of the aforementioned Anne Clifford. On the death of the Earl's younger brother, the sixth Earl, in 1721, the earldom and barony separated. The earldom was inherited by the late Earl's nephew, the seventh Earl (see the Earl of Thanet for further information on this title).

The barony fell into abeyance between the Earl's five daughters, Lady Katherine, Lady Anne, Lady Isabel, Lady Margaret and Lady Mary. It remained in abeyance until 1734 when the abeyance was terminated in favour of the third daughter, Margaret, who became the nineteenth Baroness. She was the wife of Thomas Coke, 1st Earl of Leicester. On her death in 1775, the title again fell into abeyance, this time between her sisters and their heirs. The abeyance was terminated only a year later in favour of Edward Southwell, the 20th Baron. He was the grandson of Lady Catherine Tufton, eldest daughter of the sixth Earl of Thanet. He was succeeded by his son, the 21st Baron. He was childless and on his death in 1832, the barony fell into abeyance between his sisters Hon. Sophia Southwell and Hon. Elizabeth Southwell and the heirs of his deceased sister Hon. Catherine Southwell.

The peerage was called out of abeyance in 1833 in favour of Sophia Coussmaker, the twenty-second holder. She was the only surviving child of Hon. Catherine Southwell and her husband George Coussmaker. The 22nd baroness was the wife of John Russell, third son of Lord William Russell, third son of Francis Russell, Marquess of Tavistock, eldest son and heir of John Russell, 4th Duke of Bedford. She was succeeded by her son, the 23rd Baron, Liberal Member of Parliament for Tavistock.

In 1935 Edward Russell, 26th Baron de Clifford became the last peer to be tried in the House of Lords for a felony, manslaughter, the result of a car accident. He was found not guilty. As of 2026, the title is held by his grandson Miles Russell, 28th Baron de Clifford.

Other members of the Clifford family have been created barons, namely as Baron Clifford (created 1628, in abeyance since 1858) and Baron Clifford of Chudleigh (created 1672), which title is extant and which family is the senior surviving branch of the Norman de Clifford family of Clifford Castle. Members of the family have also been created baronets as Baronet Clifford of Flaxbourne, New Zealand, Baronet Clifford of the Navy and Baronet Clifford-Constable of Tixall, Staffordshire.

== Barons de Clifford (1299) ==
Arms of de Clifford: Chequy or and azure a fess gules.

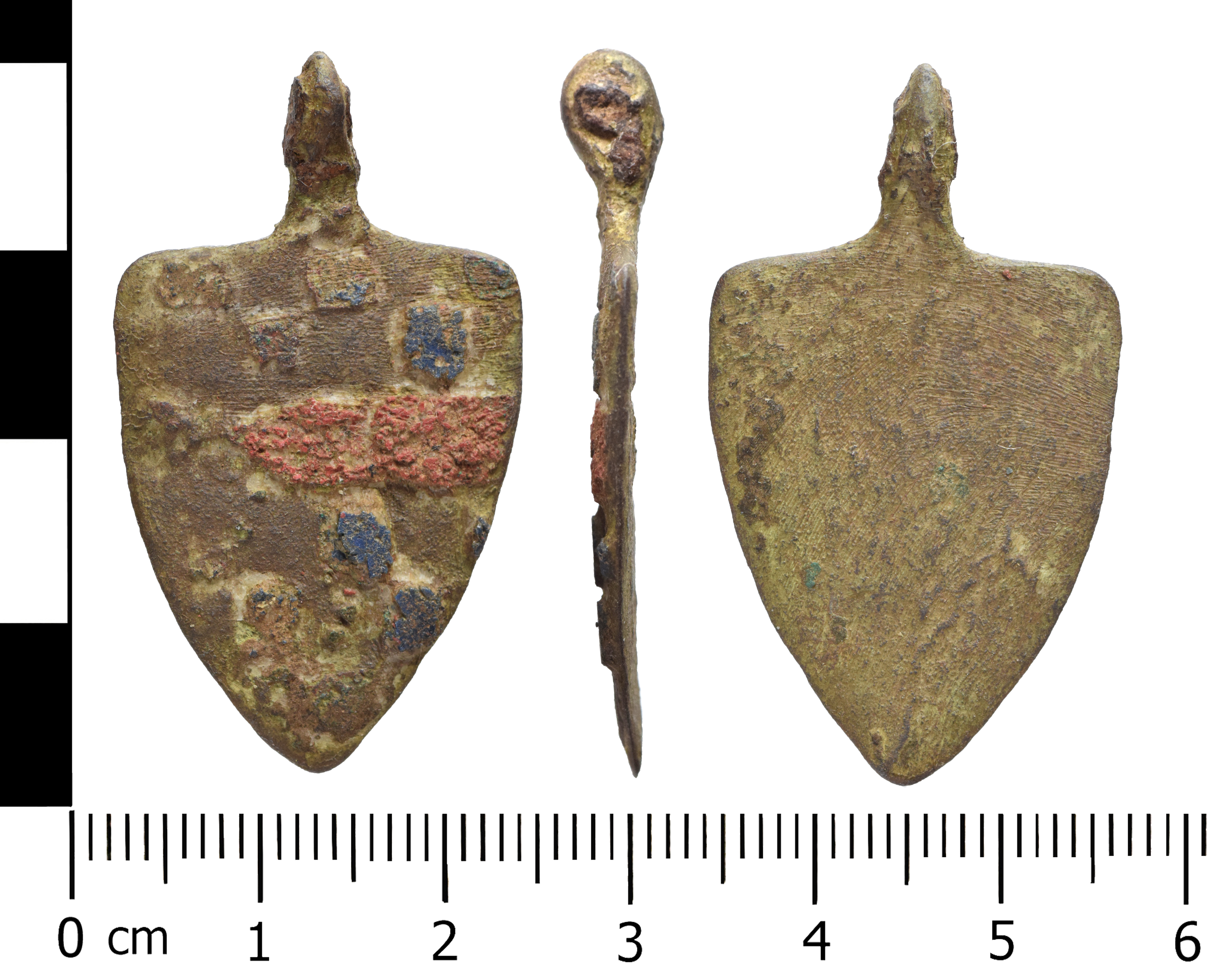
Enamelled copper alloy harness pendant. Dating to c. 14th century, it was found in Denbighshire and appears to bear the de Clifford arms.

- Robert Clifford, 1st Baron Clifford (1274–1314)
- Roger Clifford, 2nd Baron Clifford (1299–1322)
- Robert Clifford, 3rd Baron Clifford (1305–1344)
- Robert Clifford, 4th Baron Clifford (1329–1350)
- Roger Clifford, 5th Baron Clifford (1333–1389)
- Thomas Clifford, 6th Baron Clifford (1363–1391)
- John Clifford, 7th Baron Clifford (1388–1422)
- Thomas Clifford, 8th Baron Clifford (1414–1455)
- John Clifford, 9th Baron Clifford (1435–1461)
- Henry Clifford, 10th Baron Clifford (1454–1524)
- Henry Clifford, 1st Earl of Cumberland, 11th Baron Clifford (1493–1542)
- Henry Clifford, 2nd Earl of Cumberland, 12th Baron Clifford (1517–1569)
- George Clifford, 3rd Earl of Cumberland, 13th Baron Clifford (1558–1605) (dormant until 1678)
- Anne Clifford, 14th Baroness Clifford (1590–1676) (unsuccessfully claimed title in 1628; recognised in 1649)
- Nicholas Tufton, 3rd Earl of Thanet, de jure 15th Baron Clifford (1631–1679) (allowed to claim title in 1678)
- John Tufton, 4th Earl of Thanet, de jure 16th Baron Clifford (1638–1680)
- Richard Tufton, 5th Earl of Thanet, de jure 17th Baron Clifford (1640–1684)
- Thomas Tufton, 6th Earl of Thanet, 18th Baron de Clifford (1644–1721) (abeyant 1721) – first to be summoned to parliament as 'Baron de Clifford'
- Lady Margaret Tufton, 19th Baroness de Clifford (1700–1775) (abeyance terminated 1734; abeyant 1775)
- Edward Southwell, 20th Baron de Clifford (1738–1777) (abeyance terminated 1776)
- Edward Southwell, 21st Baron de Clifford (1767–1832) (abeyant 1832)
- Sophia Coussmaker, 22nd Baroness de Clifford (1791–1874) (abeyance terminated 1833)
- Edward Southwell Russell, 23rd Baron de Clifford (1824–1877)
- Edward Russell, 24th Baron de Clifford(1855–1894)
- Jack Southwell Russell, 25th Baron de Clifford (1884–1909)
- Edward Southwell Russell, 26th Baron de Clifford (1907–1982)
- John Edward Southwell Russell, 27th Baron de Clifford (1928–2018)
- Miles Edward Southwell Russell, 28th Baron de Clifford (b. 1966)

The heir apparent is the present holder's son, Hon. Edward Southwell Russell (b. 1998)

== See also ==
- Duke of Bedford
- Earl of Cumberland
- Earl of Thanet
- Clifford family (bankers) in Holland.
