= Juliana FitzGerald, Lady of Thomond =

Anglo-Norman Noble women

Juliana FitzMaurice
- Lady of Inchiquin and Youghal; Lady of Thomond
- Born: 12 April 1263; Dublin, Ireland
- Died: 29 September 1300 (aged about 37)
- Noble family: FitzGerald
- Spouses: Thomas de Clare, Lord of Thomond, Lord of Inchiquin and Youghal; Nicholas Avenel; Adam de Cretynges
- Issue: Maud de Clare; Gilbert de Clare, Lord of Thomond; Richard de Clare, Steward of Forest of Essex; Margaret de Clare, Baroness Badlesmere
- Father: Maurice FitzGerald, 3rd Lord of Offaly, Justiciar of Ireland
- Mother: Maud de Prendergast

Juliana FitzMaurice, Lady of Thomond (12 April 1263 – 29 September 1300) was an Anglo-Norman noblewoman, the daughter of Maurice FitzGerald, 3rd Lord of Offaly, and the wife of Thomas de Clare, Lord of Thomond, a powerful Anglo-Norman baron in Ireland, who was a younger brother of Gilbert de Clare, 6th Earl of Hertford. Juliana was married three times; Thomas being her first. She is sometimes referred to as Juliane FitzMaurice.

== Early life and family ==
Juliana FitzMaurice was born on 12 April 1263 in Dublin, Ireland, the eldest daughter of Maurice FitzGerald II, 3rd Lord of Offaly, Justiciar of Ireland and Maud de Prendergast. She had a sister Amabel who married but was childless. Her first cousin was John FitzGerald, 1st Earl of Kildare. Her paternal grandparents were Maurice FitzGerald I, 2nd Lord of Offaly and Juliana, and her maternal grandparents were Sir Gerald de Prendergast of Beauvoir and Matilda de Burgh, daughter of Richard Mor de Burgh, Lord of Connacht and Egidia de Lacy. Juliana's maternal ancestors included Niall of the Nine Hostages, Brian Boru, Dermot McMurrough, and Maud de Braose.

Juliana's father, Maurice FitzGerald, was married twice, first to Maud de Prendergast and secondly to Emmeline Longespee. It has been some source of contention as to which of his two wives had issue Juliana. However, at her death, Emmeline de Longespée did not mention Juliana as her daughter and heir; rather, Emmeline's heir was her niece, Maud la Zouche, wife of Robert la Zouche, 1st Lord Holland. It has been concluded by several reputable researchers that Juliana's mother was Maurice FitzGerald's first wife, Maud de Prendergast. Supporters for Emmeline de Longespée being the mother have yet to produce any counter-evidence beyond hearsay.

== Marriages and issue ==
In 1275, at the age of 12, Juliana married her first husband, Thomas de Clare, Lord of Thomond, Lord of Inchiquin and Youghal. He was the second eldest son of Richard de Clare, 5th Earl of Hertford, 2nd Earl of Gloucester and Maud de Lacy. Thomas was a friend of King Edward I of England, with whom he went on a Crusade. He held many important posts including the Office of Governor of Colchester Castle (1266), Governor of the City of London (1273). He was also the commander of the English forces in Munster, Ireland, and on 26 January 1276, he was granted the lordship of Thomond. He was born in 1245, which made him about eighteen years older than Juliana. Throughout their marriage, the couple lived in both Ireland and England. It is recorded that on 5 May 1284, King Edward notified his lieges and bailiffs in Ireland of the attorneys who were to act on behalf of Thomas and Juliana as they were in England at the time. This arrangement continued for another three years except while they were residing in Ireland.

Thomas and Juliana had four children:

- Maud de Clare (c. 1276–1326/27), married firstly on 3 November 1295 Robert de Clifford, 1st Baron de Clifford, by whom she had issue; she married secondly after 1314 Robert de Welle.
- Gilbert de Clare, Lord of Thomond (3 February 1281 – 1308)
- Richard de Clare, Steward of Forest of Essex, 1st Lord Clare, Lord of Thomond (after 1281 – 10 May 1318 at the Battle of Dysert O'Dea), married a woman by the name of Joan by whom he fathered one son, Thomas.
- Margaret de Clare (1 April 1287 – 22 October 1333), married firstly before 1303 Gilbert de Umfreville; she married secondly before 30 June 1308 Bartholomew de Badlesmere, 1st Lord Badlesmere, by whom she had four daughters and one son.

The era was marked by unrest and strife as civil war was waged between rival factions of the powerful O'Brien clan. In 1277, Juliana's husband had his former ally Brian Ruad, the deposed King of Thomond, hanged for treason at Bunratty.

Thomas died on 29 August 1287, leaving Juliana a widow at the age of twenty-four with four small children. On an unknown date she married her second husband, Nicholas Avenel. He presumably died before 11 December 1291/16 February 1292, as this is when she married her third husband, Adam de Cretynges.

== Death and legacy ==
Juliana died on 29 September 1300. Her numerous descendants included Ralph Neville, 1st Earl of Westmorland who married Lady Joan Beaufort and thus their descendant, the English king Edward IV. By Edward IV's daughter, Elizabeth of York, consort of Henry VII, she was an ancestress to all subsequent monarchs of England and the current British royal family. Henry VIII's queens consort Anne Boleyn, Jane Seymour, Catherine Howard, and Catherine Parr also descended from her.

== Ancestry ==
Ancestors of Juliana FitzMaurice

16. Maurice FitzGerald, Lord of Lanstephan
8. Gerald FitzMaurice, 1st Lord of Offaly
17. Alice de Montgomery
4. Maurice FitzGerald, 2nd Lord of Offaly
18. Robert de Bermingham
9. Eve de Bermingham
2. Maurice FitzGerald, 3rd Lord of Offaly
5. Joanna de Geneville
1. Juliana FitzMaurice
24. Maurice de Prendergast, Lord Prendergast
12. Philip de Prendergast, Lord of Enniscorthy
25. N. FitzGerald
6. Gerald de Prendergast
26. Robert de Quincy
13. Maud de Quincy
27. Basilie de Clare
3. Maud de Prendergast
28. William de Burgh
14. Richard Mor de Burgh
29. Princess (Ní Briain) of Thomond
7. Matilda de Burgh
30. Walter de Lacy, Lord of Meath
15. Egidia de Lacy
31. Margaret de Braose
