= Thomas de Clare, Lord of Thomond =

Anglo-Norman nobleman

Thomas de Clare
- Lord of Thomond, Lord of Inchiquin and Youghal
- Arms of the de Clare Family

Hereditary
- Lord of Thomond: 1276–1287
- Predecessor: New Creation
- Successor: Gilbert de Clare, 2nd Lord of Thomond
- Born: c. 1245; Tonbridge Castle, Tonbridge, Kent, England
- Died: 29 August 1287; Thomond, Lordship of Ireland, Ireland
- Family: de Clare
- Spouse: Juliana FitzGerald
- Issue: Maud de Clare, Baroness de Welles; Gilbert de Clare, 2nd Lord of Thomond; Richard de Clare, Steward of Forest of Essex; Margaret de Clare, Baroness Badlesmere
- Father: Richard de Clare, 6th Earl of Hertford, 2nd Earl of Gloucester
- Mother: Maud de Lacy
- Occupation: Peerage of England

Thomas de Clare, Lord of Thomond (c. 1245 – 29 August 1287) was an Anglo-Norman peer and soldier. He was the second son of Richard de Clare, 6th Earl of Gloucester and his wife Maud de Lacy, Countess of Gloucester. In 1272 he served a term as Lieutenant of the Duchy of Aquitaine. On 26 January 1276 he was granted the Lordship of Thomond by Edward I of England; he spent the next eight years attempting to conquer it from the O'Brien dynasty, kings of Thomond.

== Career ==
Thomas was born in about 1245 in Tonbridge, Kent, England, the second eldest son of Richard de Clare and Maud de Lacy. He and his brother Bogo received gifts from King Henry III when they were studying at Oxford from 1257 to 1259. Thomas was a close friend and intimate advisor of Prince Edward of England, who would in 1272 accede to the throne as King Edward I. Together they took part in the Ninth Crusade. He held many important posts such as Governor of Colchester Castle (1266) and Governor of The City of London (1273). He was made Commander of the English forces in Munster, Ireland and created Lord of Inchiquin and Youghal. On 26 January 1276, he was granted the entire lordship of Thomond by King Edward.

That same year, he jointly commanded a Norman army along with Sir Geoffrey de Geneville, Justiciar of Ireland against the Irish clans of County Wicklow. They were joined by a contingent of men from Connacht led by his father-in-law Maurice FitzGerald, 3rd Lord of Offaly. Thomas and Justiciar de Geneville's forces attacked the Irish at Glenmalure, but they were soundly defeated and suffered severe losses.

== Civil War in Thomond ==
Civil war raged in Thomond between the rival factions of the O'Brien dynasty. In 1276, Brian Ruad, the deposed King of Thomond appealed to Thomas for support to help him regain his kingdom from his great-nephew Toirrdelbach MacTaidg O' Brien, who had usurped the throne. In return for his aid, Brian Ruad promised that Thomas would be allowed to colonise all the land between Athsollus in Quin and Limerick. Together, Thomas and Brian Ruad expelled Toirrdelbach MacTaidg O'Brien and recaptured Clonroad which the latter had taken from Brian Ruad. O'Brien escaped to Galway where he elicited the help of his cousin William de Burgh, and in 1277 together with the assistance from clans, MacNamara and O'Dea they defeated the combined forces of Thomas and Brian Ruad. The latter fled to Bunratty Castle, but Thomas had his former ally hanged and drawn for treason. The civil war continued for the next seven years, with Thomas supporting Brian Ruad's son Donnchad against Toirrdelbach; however, following the drowning death of Donnchad in 1284, Toirrdelbach emerged the victor. Thereafter until his death in 1306, Toirrdelbach MacTaidg O'Brien ruled as undisputed King of Thomond and Thomas had no choice but to accommodate him. O'Brien rented part of Bunratty Manor at £121 per annum. In 1280, Thomas embarked on a castle-building project at Quin, but was disrupted in his efforts by the O'Briens and MacNamaras. Thomas also reconstructed Bunratty Castle in stone, replacing the earlier wooden building.

== Marriage and children ==
In February 1275, he married Juliana FitzGerald, the 12-year-old daughter of Maurice FitzGerald, 3rd Lord of Offaly and Maud de Prendergast. During their marriage, Thomas and Juliana lived in Ireland and in England. For instance, on 5 May 1284 the King notified his bailiffs and lieges in Ireland of the attorneys who were to act in Ireland on behalf of the couple as they were then in England. This arrangement was to continue for three years, except when Thomas and Juliana went to Ireland.

Thomas and Juliana had four children:

- Maud de Clare (1276–1327), married firstly, Robert de Clifford, 1st Baron de Clifford, by whom she had issue; and secondly Sir Robert de Welle.
- Gilbert de Clare, Lord of Thomond, (3 February 1281 – 1308)
- Richard de Clare, Steward of Forest of Essex, 1st Lord Clare, Lord of Thomond (after 1281 – 10 May 1318), married a woman by the name of Joan, by whom he had one son, Thomas. He was killed at the Battle of Dysert O'Dea.
- Margaret de Clare (c. 1 April 1287 – 22 October 1333/3 January 1334), married firstly, Gilbert de Umfraville; and secondly Bartholomew de Badlesmere, 1st Baron Badlesmere, by whom she had issue.

== Death ==
When evidence was taken in 1302 to prove the age of his son Gilbert, it was established that Thomas had died on 29 August 1287. A mid-18th century compilation known as the Dublin Annals of Inisfallen states that Thomas was killed in battle against Turlough son of Teige and others. However, none of the earlier records of his death indicate that Thomas met a violent end. Some of the witnesses to Gilbert's age in 1302 referred to the date of Thomas' death in their calculations but all were silent as to its circumstances. This and much other evidence on the subject has been set out and evaluated by Goddard Henry Orpen of Trinity College, Dublin. Thomas was succeeded as Lord of Thomond by his eldest son, Gilbert who was six years old. His widow Juliana, aged 24 years, would go on to marry two more times.

== Ancestry ==
Ancestors of Thomas de Clare, Lord of Thomond

8. Richard de Clare, 3rd Earl of Hertford
4. Gilbert de Clare, 4th Earl of Hertford
9. Amice FitzRobert, Countess of Gloucester
2. Richard de Clare, 6th Earl of Gloucester
10. William Marshal, 1st Earl of Pembroke
5. Isabel Marshal
11. Isabel de Clare, 4th Countess of Pembroke
1. Thomas de Clare, Lord of Thomond
12. Roger de Lacy, Baron of Pontefract
6. John de Lacy, 2nd Earl of Lincoln
13. Maud de Clere
3. Maud de Lacy
14. Robert de Quincy
7. Margaret de Quincy
15. Hawise of Chester, Countess of Lincoln

Peerage of Ireland
Preceded by New creation	Lord of Thomond; 1276–1287	Succeeded by Gilbert de Clare
