= Roger de Clifford (died 1282) =

13th century English nobleman

- Died: 6 November 1282; Menai Straits
- Buried: Shap Abbey, Cumbria, England
- Spouse: Isabel de Vieuxpont
- Issue: Robert Clifford, 1st Baron Clifford
- Father: Roger de Clifford (died 1285?)
- Mother: Hawise Botterell

Roger de Clifford (died 6 November 1282), Lord of Appleby, Master of Topcliffe, was an English noble. He participated in Edward I's conquest of Wales in 1282. From Anglesey, an English force crossed over the Menai Strait where they were defeated at the Battle of Moel-y-don, and Clifford was slain during the battle.

== Life ==
Roger was the eldest son of Roger de Clifford by Hawise Botterell.

He was summoned to take part during the second campaign of Edward I against Wales in 1282. An English army proposed to cross the Menai Strait via a boat bridge over from Anglesay to Gwynedd, in an attempt to form a second front at the rear of the Welsh forces. The English army, led by Luke de Tany, crossed over the boat bridge on 6 November; however, they were attacked by the Welsh on the opposite side. In the ensuing battle of the Menai Strait, the English forces were driven back across the bridge. The boat bridge was destroyed, leaving more than 300 killed or drowned, including Clifford and Tany.

He was succeeded by his only son Robert from his wife Isabella, daughter of Robert de Vieuxpont and his wife Isabel.
