= Walter de Clifford (died 1221) =

Welsh marcher lord (c. 1160 – 1221)

Original arms of de Clifford, adopted at start of the age of heraldry, c. 1200 – 1215: Chequy or and azure a bend gules

Walter de Clifford (c. 1160 – 17 January 1221) was a Welsh marcher lord, feudal baron of Clifford of Clifford Castle in Herefordshire and High Sheriff in England.

He was born in Clifford Castle, Herefordshire, the son of Walter de Clifford (1113–1190).

Walter served as High Sheriff of Herefordshire in 1199, 1207–1208 and 1216. He was a close associate of William de Braose and although he held back from William's rebellion in March 1208, was not thought to have done enough to check it. As a result, King John dismissed him from his Marcher barony of Clifford and made his son Walter de Clifford (died 1263) de facto lord instead.

== Family ==
Walter had married Agnes Cundy of Kent in 1185 and was succeeded by his sons, Walter de Clifford (died 1263) and Roger Clifford, who founded the line of Northumbrian Cliffords. He had at least three other sons, Giles, Richard and Simon, as well as daughters Maud, Basilia and Cecilia.
