= Robert de Vieuxpont (died 1264) =

13th century English nobleman

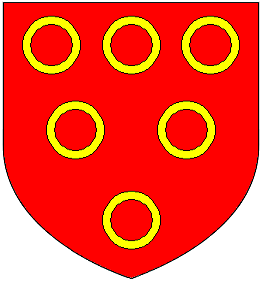
- Arms of Robert de Vieuxpont: Gules, six annulets or
- Died: 1264
- Buried: Shap Abbey, Cumbria, England
- Spouse: Isabel
- Father: John Vieuxpont
- Mother: Sibyl de Ferrers

Robert de Vieuxpont (died 1264), Lord of Appleby, was an English noble. He fought on the side of Simon de Montfort, 6th Earl of Leicester during the Second Barons' War. He was injured and later died from his wounds received at the Battle of Lewes in 1264.

== Life ==
Robert was the second son of John de Vieuxpont and Sibyl de Ferrers. His eldest brother John died in 1241 and Robert became heir to his father in 1242. Wounded during the battle of Lewes on 14 May 1264, Robert later died of his wounds later that year. After Henry III of England defeated de Montfort at the Battle of Evesham in 1265, Robert's estates were seized by the Crown, but later returned as settlement. His estate was divided between his two daughters.

== Marriage and issue ==
Robert married Isabel, daughter of John Fitzgeoffrey and Isabel Bigod, by whom he had the following children:

- Isabella, married Roger de Clifford, and had children.
- Idonea, married firstly Roger de Leybourne, without issue, and secondly John de Cromwell, without issue.

== Bibliography ==
- Richardson, Douglas (2011). Magna Carta Ancestry: A Study in Colonial and Medieval Families, (2nd ed.). p. 500. ISBN 9781461045205.
- Hunt, William (1899). "Vieuxpont, Robert de" . In Lee, Sidney (ed.). Dictionary of National Biography. Vol. 58. London: Smith, Elder & Co. pp. 304–305.
