= Badlesmere =

Badlesmere may refer to:

== Places ==
- Badlesmere, Kent, a village and civil parish in the Swale district of Kent, England

== People ==
- Baron Badlesmere, abeyant barony in the Peerage of England
  - Bartholomew de Badlesmere, 1st Baron Badlesmere (1275–1322), English soldier, Member of Parliament, landowner and nobleman
  - Giles de Badlesmere, 2nd Baron Badlesmere (1314–1338), English nobleman
- Elizabeth de Badlesmere, Countess of Northampton (1313–1356), English noblewoman, wife of two English noblemen
- Gunselm de Badlesmere (c. 1232–c.1301), English Justice of Chester and Cheshire
- Margaret de Clare, Baroness Badlesmere (c.1287 – 1333 or 1334), Norman-Irish noblewoman
- Maud de Badlesmere, Countess of Oxford (1310–1366), English noblewoman
