= Thomas Fitzalan, 5th Earl of Arundel =

English noble who took part in the deposition of Richard II

Sir Thomas Fitzalan
- 5th Earl of Arundel; 10th Earl of Surrey
- Born: 13 October 1381
- Died: 13 October 1415 (aged 34)
- Noble family: FitzAlan
- Spouse: Beatrice, Countess of Arundel
- Father: Richard Fitzalan
- Mother: Elizabeth de Bohun

Lord Treasurer
- In office 1413–1415
- Monarch: Henry V of England
- Preceded by: Sir John Pelham
- Succeeded by: Sir Hugh Mortimer

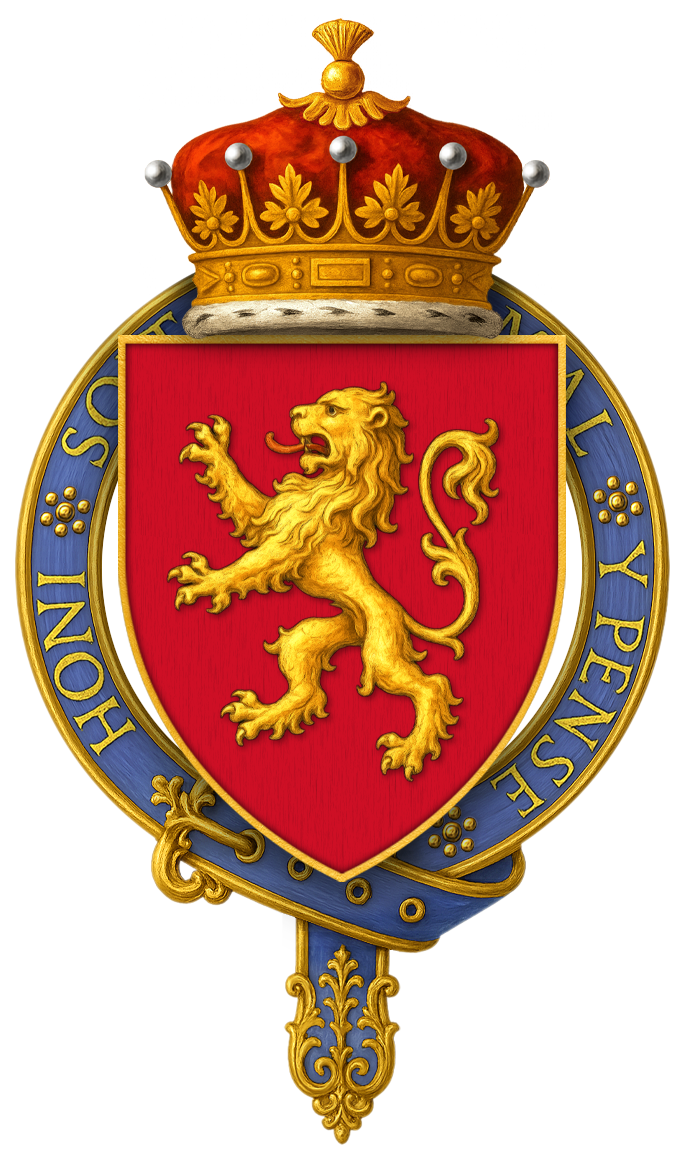
Arms of Sir Richard Fitzalan, 4th Earl of Arundel, KG

Thomas Fitzalan, 5th Earl of Arundel, 10th Earl of Surrey (13 October 1381 – 13 October 1415) was an English nobleman, one of the principals of the deposition of Richard II, and a major figure during the reign of Henry IV.

== Lineage ==
He was the only surviving son of the 4th Earl of Arundel (Second Creation) and his first wife, Elizabeth de Bohun. His father was executed in 1397, when he was 16, and his lands and titles were forfeited. Fitzalan was a royal ward of King Richard's half-brother, John Holland, 1st Duke of Exeter, along with a large part of the Arundel estates. Holland greatly mistreated him, a matter Fitzalan would cruelly repay many years later.

== Escape, exile, return and restoration ==
Fitzalan eventually escaped from his guardian and joined his uncle Thomas Arundel, the deposed Archbishop of Canterbury, in exile. The two eventually joined with another exile, the King's cousin Henry Bolingbroke.

Fitzalan followed Henry in his return to England in July 1399, and in the following events which led to the deposition of King Richard II and Henry's crowning as King Henry IV. He functioned as butler at the coronation, and shortly afterwards the new King restored him to his titles and estates. These included two notable Earldoms; those of Earl of Arundel and Earl of Surrey, and large estates in the Welsh Marches.

== The Epiphany Rising ==
In early January 1400, a group of Barons who had been close to the deposed King Richard II revolted in a rebellion known as the Epiphany Rising—amongst them Fitzalan's former guardian John Holland. The latter was captured by followers of Fitzalan's aunt Joan, Countess of Hereford, and at Fitzalan's behest was soon executed (some claim he was tortured first).

== The rebellion of Owain Glyndŵr in Wales ==
The next few years, Fitzalan was much occupied by events in the Welsh marches, where he had to help deal with the revolt of Owain Glyndŵr which ran in full from 1400 to maybe 1412 but gained a great deal of early momentum until 1405. After the Battle of Shrewsbury in 1403, he was appointed to defend the Marches from further attacks along its full length and then focused on defeating Glyndŵr in the northern March adjacent to North Wales.

== Revolt in the North ==
In 1405 there was a revolt in the north of England, led by Richard le Scrope, Archbishop of York; and Thomas de Mowbray, 4th Earl of Norfolk. Fitzalan was the head of the Commission which condemned the pair to death. This apparently led to a falling out between Fitzalan and his uncle, Archbishop Thomas Arundel, who objected to the execution of a fellow prelate.

== Portuguese alliance and marriages ==
King Henry's sister, Philippa of Lancaster, had married King John I of Portugal, and to further cement the alliance between England and Portugal, Fitzalan married Beatrice, the illegitimate daughter of John I. The wedding took place in London on 26 November 1405, with King Henry IV in attendance.

== Welsh conflicts and alliance with Burgundy ==
In the following years Fitzalan again had to help suppress revolts in Wales and the Welsh Marches. Politically, Fitzalan allied himself with the King's half-brothers the Beauforts, and when Thomas Beaufort, Duke of Exeter, was appointed Chancellor in 1410, Fitzalan became one of the King's principal councillors. Beaufort favoured an alliance with Burgundy, and Fitzalan was one of the leaders of those sent to help fight the rival Armagnac faction in France. Sometime in this period, Fitzalan was made a Knight of the Garter.

Henry IV fell seriously ill in 1411, but was determined to forge an alliance with John the Fearless, Duke of Burgundy. The King announced his intention that a fleet would be sailing to Calais, and issued instructions to ambassadors to go to Burgundy's offer of a military aid against Orleans. But two days before the fleet was due to sail, the king changed his mind, and on 21 September 1411 declared Parliament would meet in November. Instead, Arundel set sail with a private fleet and a mercenary force hired by the Burgundians from the Prince of Wales. Arundel found himself in a difficult dilemma: the king wanted an Armagnac alliance, but the prince preferred to deal with Burgundy. A double-dealing policy commenced negotiating with the duke of Berry while continuing to reinforce Burgundy. But the old king recovered at the November Parliament, and the prince's Regency council was dismissed. On 9 November, Arundel led 1,000 archers to aid the Burgundians to victory before the bridge at the Battle of St Cloud, near Paris. Some of Arundel's men fought in the ranks of Duke's bodyguard.

The Peace of Chartres signed by Henry IV in 1409 was broken. His policy of pro-Valois Armagnac diplomacy was enshrined in the Treaty of Bourges. But no sooner had it been signed on 20 May, the friends of the Burgundian elites declared it illegal, because it was. John the Fearless raised a royal army forcing Berry to surrender Bourges in the name of Charles VI on 15 July. The very next day the peace was renewed by the French nobility in a promissory letter to Henry IV signed by the dukes of Berry, Orleans, Bourbon and Burgundy.

On 10 August 1412, the peace was again threatened by Thomas, Duke of Clarence who extorted a humiliating ransom from the Armagnacs after he had landed at St Vaast-le-Hogue. The King favoured Clarence over his older brother, so the Beauforts lost influence, and Arundel retired to his estates. Clarence was instructed to proceed to Gascony to await; the next spring King Henry IV died.

== Great friend and soldier of Henry V ==
Arundel was with Henry at Westminster for Christmas 1414. As one of the king's close friends, he displayed the cardinal virtues of loyalty to the Lancastrian monarchy, as well as enjoying the honour of personal comradeship. Some lords remained loyal to Richard II and threatened rebellion throughout the North. There were those on the Welsh Marches, such as the Chamberlain of Chester who had deserted to Owain Glendower.

The new King Henry V restored the Earl of Arundel to a place of influence, immediately appointing him Lord Treasurer, as well as constable of Dover Castle and Warden of the Cinque Ports. On 19 March 1415, The Lord Warden was ordered to summon and array seamen for forthcoming fleet operations: 57 ships from the Cinque Ports in 40 days were expected to assemble. No ship of more than 20 tuns was permitted to leave port. All requisitioned vessels were to be taken to Southampton by 8 May. On St George's Day at Windsor Arundel was made a Knight of the Garter with precedence. He was among 16 of the 25 knights preparing for war that summer. The following day 24 April, the king rewarded his friend with an additional £300 on top of a modest salary as Lord Treasurer of £100 per annum. Arundel's experience deploying massed ranks of longbowmen was vital to Henry's strategy to succeed; as many as 2,000 had been used at St Cloud.

But the invasion date was put back to 1 July, at the end of April. On 15 June a service was held at St Paul's; Arundel could not have known he would not return in triumph, so he lingered at least until 24 June. Meanwhile, he was despatched on an expedition "into parts of Wales" to raise more archers to add complement to existing units. The royal household paid him £18 12s expenses, but the coffers being bare, Arundel's troops did not receive all their wages.

On 27 May 1415, Arundel and Thomas Beaufort had been put in charge of provisioning Calais and the army in Normandy. This included a scheme devised by the Keeper of the Privy Seal to extort money out of Italian merchants in London that raised nearly £2000. As they were about to leave (8 August) Southampton by ship, King Henry replaced Arundel with a new Treasurer, Sir John Rothenhale; Arundel was on the campaign to fight. He wrote a will signing over his estates to trustees for his wife, Beatrice, Countess Arundel and the children for which he gained the King's consent.

Noblesse oblige was one of Arundel's personal chivalric codes. When it was revealed the earl of March was inveigled into the Southampton Plot, Arundel and Lord Scrope provided the bulk of the 10,000-mark fine imposed by Henry for this illegal marriage to Anne Stafford. Arundel's astute business dealings saved March and the King at the Michaelmas Council, which was in uproar. Bishop Richard Countenay of Norwich had died, the Duke of Clarence was ill, but Arundel remained the King's "great friend". The Southampton plotters attempted to implicate Arundel, but as their testimony unravelled it became clear Sir Thomas Gray was speaking spiteful lies, and the young earl was held to be without blame.

Arundel was one of the initial commanders of Henry V's 1415 French campaign, he sailed with a minimum one hundred men-at-arms, and three hundred archers. Of his own retinue two men-at-arms and thirteen archers died at the siege of Harfleur. At least 14 men-at-arms and 68 archers were sick, and sent home on the Feast of St Wenceslas (29 September); Arundel was among them with five men-at-arms to help him. The Council advised the king against a proposed march to Calais, but Arundel had to return to Sussex on 10 October 1415. He was nursed by a faithful retainer's wife, Elizabeth Ryman. In his will made on 10 October, he asked to be buried in the church of the Holy Trinity, Arundel. He left 200 marks for a funeral, and required a statue be erected over his father's grave. He had pledged a vow to pray to St John of Bridlington when he was a servant of Prince Hal; and now at Mary Gate, Arundel, a chapel was to be built dedicated to the Virgin. Arundel wanted all the wages arrears to be paid by his heirs that were owed to the soldiery.

== Ancestry ==
Ancestors of Thomas Fitzalan, 5th Earl of Arundel

8. Edmund Fitzalan, 2nd Earl of Arundel
4. Richard Fitzalan, 3rd Earl of Arundel
9. Alice de Warenne
2. Richard Fitzalan, 4th Earl of Arundel
10. Henry, 3rd Earl of Lancaster
5. Eleanor of Lancaster
11. Maud Chaworth
1. Thomas Fitzalan, 5th Earl of Arundel
12. Humphrey de Bohun, 4th Earl of Hereford
6. William de Bohun, 1st Earl of Northampton
13. Elizabeth of Rhuddlan
3. Elizabeth de Bohun
14. Bartholomew de Badlesmere, 1st Baron Badlesmere
7. Elizabeth de Badlesmere
15. Margaret de Clare, Baroness Badlesmere

== Succession ==
Fitzalan left no legitimate children. The castle and lordship of Arundel was inherited by his cousin John Fitzalan, 6th Earl of Arundel. The Earldom of Surrey fell into abeyance (or became extinct; authorities differ on this matter). The rest of his property was split amongst his three surviving sisters.

== See also ==
- List of lord high treasurers of England and Great Britain

Honorary titles
Preceded by The Prince of Wales	Lord Warden of the Cinque Ports; 1412–1415	Succeeded by The Duke of Gloucester
Political offices
Preceded by Sir John Pelham	Lord Treasurer; 1413–1415	Succeeded by Sir Hugh Mortimer
Peerage of England
Forfeit Title last held by Richard Fitzalan III	Earl of Arundel; 1399–1415	Succeeded by John Fitzalan V
Forfeit Title last held by Richard Fitzalan III	Earl of Surrey; 1400–1415	Extinct
