= Elizabeth Fitzalan, Countess of Arundel =

English noblewoman (c.1350–1385)

Elizabeth Fitzalan
- Countess of Arundel; Countess of Surrey
- Born: c.1350 England
- Died: 3 April 1385; England
- Noble family: Bohun
- Spouse: Richard FitzAlan, 11th Earl of Arundel
- Issue: Thomas FitzAlan, 5th Earl of Arundel; Lady Eleanor FitzAlan; Lady Elizabeth FitzAlan; Lady Joan FitzAlan; Lady Alice FitzAlan; Lady Margaret FitzAlan son FitzAlan (name given as either Richard or William)
- Father: William de Bohun, 1st Earl of Northampton
- Mother: Elizabeth de Badlesmere

Elizabeth Fitzalan, Countess of Arundel, Countess of Surrey (née de Bohun; c. 1350 – 3 April 1385), was a member of the Anglo-Norman Bohun family, which wielded much power in the Welsh Marches and the English government.

She was the first wife of Richard FitzAlan, 4th Earl of Arundel and 9th Earl of Surrey. He was a powerful English nobleman and military commander in the reigns of Edward III and Richard II. She was the mother of seven of his children, and as the wife of one of the most powerful nobles in the realm, enjoyed much prestige and took precedence over most of the other peers' wives.

== Family and lineage ==
Lady Elizabeth de Bohun was born around 1350, the daughter of William de Bohun, 1st Earl of Northampton, and Elizabeth de Badlesmere. Her older brother Humphrey de Bohun, 7th Earl of Hereford, married Joan FitzAlan, a sister of the 11th Earl of Arundel, by whom he had two daughters.

Her paternal grandparents were Humphrey de Bohun, 4th Earl of Hereford, and Elizabeth of Rhuddlan, daughter of King Edward I of England and Eleanor of Castile. Her maternal grandparents were Bartholomew de Badlesmere, 1st Baron Badlesmere, and Margaret de Clare.

Lady Elizabeth's parents both died when she was young, her mother having died in 1356, and her father in 1360. She had a half-brother, Roger Mortimer, 2nd Earl of March, by her mother's first marriage to Sir Edmund Mortimer.

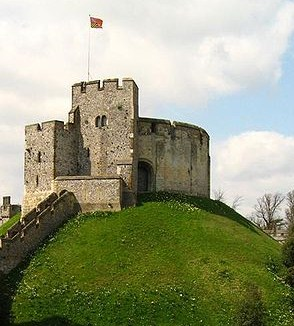
Arundel Castle, principal residence of Richard Fitzalan and Elizabeth de Bohun.

== Marriage and issue ==
On 28 September 1359, by papal dispensation, Elizabeth married Richard FitzAlan, 4th Earl of Arundel and 9th Earl of Surrey. He succeeded to the earldoms of Arundel and Surrey upon the death of his father, Richard FitzAlan, 3rd Earl of Arundel, in 1376. Their marriage was especially advantageous as it united two of the most powerful families in England. The alliance was further strengthened by the marriage of Elizabeth's brother, Humphrey to FitzAlan's sister, Joan.

As the Countess of Arundel, Elizabeth was one of the most important women in England, who enjoyed much prestige, and after the Queen, the Duchesses of Lancaster and York, and the Countess of Buckingham, took precedence over the other noble ladies in the realm.

At the coronation of King Richard II, FitzAlan carried the crown. In the same year, 1377, he was made Admiral of the South and West. The following year, 1378, he attacked Harfleur, but was repelled by the French.

FitzAlan allied himself with the King's uncle, Thomas of Woodstock, Duke of Gloucester, who was married to FitzAlan's niece, Eleanor de Bohun, who was also Elizabeth's niece. The two men eventually became members of the Council of Regency, and formed a strong and virulent opposition to the King. This would later prove fatal to both men.

Richard and Elizabeth had seven children:

- Thomas FitzAlan, 5th Earl of Arundel, Earl of Surrey KG (13 October 1381 – 13 October 1415), married 26 November 1405, Beatrice, Countess of Arundel, illegitimate daughter of King John I of Portugal and Inês Pires. The marriage was arranged and paid for by Henry IV to strengthen his alliance with Portugal. It produced no issue.
- Lady Eleanor FitzAlan (c. 1365 - 1375), on 28 October 1371, at the age of about six, married Robert de Ufford. Died before reaching adulthood.
- Lady Elizabeth FitzAlan (1366 - 8 July 1425), married firstly before 1378, Sir William de Montagu, secondly in 1384, Thomas Mowbray, 1st Duke of Norfolk, by whom she had four children, thirdly before 19 August 1401, Sir Robert Goushill, by whom she had two daughters, and fourthly before 1411, Sir Gerard Afflete. The Howard Dukes of Norfolk descend from her daughter Margaret Mowbray who married Sir Robert Howard.
- Lady Joan FitzAlan (1375 - 14 November 1435), married William de Beauchamp, 1st Baron Bergavenny, by whom she had a son, Richard de Beauchamp, 1st Earl of Worcester and a daughter Joan de Beauchamp, wife of James Butler, 4th Earl of Ormonde.
- Lady Alice Fitzalan (1378 - before October 1415), married before March 1392, John Cherlton, Lord Cherlton. Had an affair with Cardinal Henry Beaufort, by whom she had an illegitimate daughter, Jane Beaufort.
- Lady Margaret FitzAlan (1382 - after 1423), married Sir Rowland Lenthall, of Hampton Court, Herefordshire, by whom she had two sons.
- Son FitzAlan (his name is given as either Richard or William).

== Death ==
Elizabeth Fitzalan, Countess of Arundel, Countess of Surrey, died on 3 April 1385. She was buried at Lewes in Sussex. Her husband married secondly Philippa Mortimer on 15 August 1390, by whom he had a son: John FitzAlan (born 1394 - died after 1397).

Richard FitzAlan was executed by decapitation on 21 September 1397 at Tower Hill Cheapside, London for having committed high treason against King Richard. His titles and estates were attainted until October 1400, when they were restored to his son and heir, Thomas FitzAlan, 5th Earl of Arundel, by the new king, Henry IV, who had ascended to the English throne upon the deposition of King Richard in 1399.

== Ancestry ==
Ancestors of Elizabeth Fitzalan, Countess of Arundel

Humphrey de Bohun
Humphrey de Bohun, 3rd Earl of Hereford
Eleanor de Braose
Humphrey de Bohun, 4th Earl of Hereford
Enguerrand II de Fiennes
Maud de Fiennes
Isabelle de Conde
William de Bohun, 1st Earl of Northampton
Henry III of England
Edward I of England
Eleanor of Provence
Elizabeth of Rhuddlan
Ferdinand III of Castile
Eleanor of Castile
Jeanne, Countess of Ponthieu
Elizabeth de Bohun
Bartholomew de Badlesmere
Gunselm de Badlesmere
Margaret Leveland
Bartholomew de Badlesmere, 1st Baron Badlesmere
Ralph FitzBernard
Joan FitzBernard
Joan Aquillon
Elizabeth de Badlesmere
Richard de Clare, 6th Earl of Hertford, 2nd Earl of Gloucester
Thomas de Clare, Lord of Thomond
Maud de Lacy
Margaret de Clare
Maurice FitzGerald, 3rd Lord of Offaly
Juliana FitzGerald of Offaly
Maud de Prendergast
