= Elizabeth FitzAlan =

Elizabeth FitzAlan may refer to:

- Elizabeth Fitzalan, Duchess of Norfolk (1366–1425), English noblewoman and the wife of Thomas Mowbray, 1st Duke of Norfolk
- Elizabeth Fitzalan, Countess of Arundel (died 1385), wife of Richard FitzAlan, 9th Earl of Arundel
- Elizabeth le Despenser (died 1408), also Elizabeth FitzAlan, English noblewoman and the wife of John FitzAlan, 2nd Baron Arundel, 2nd Baron Maltravers (1364–1390)
