= Upper Sundon =

Village in Bedfordshire, England

Coordinates: 51.93834°N 0.481°W

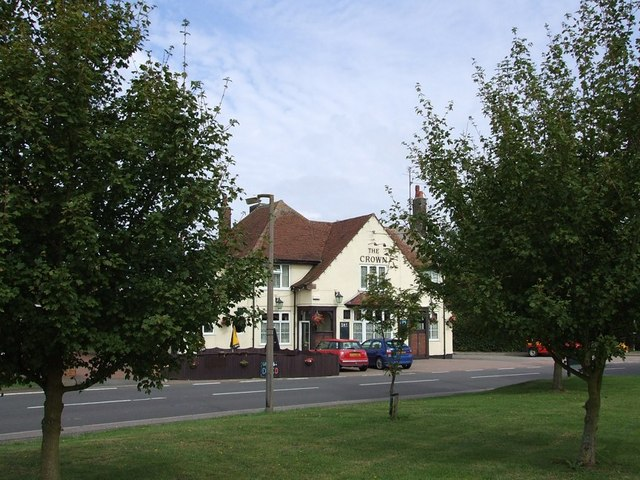
- The Crown, Upper Sundon

- Location within Bedfordshire
- OS grid reference: TL045277
- Civil parish: Sundon
- Unitary authority: Central Bedfordshire
- Ceremonial county: Bedfordshire
- Region: East
- Country: England
- Sovereign state: United Kingdom
- Post town: LUTON
- Postcode district: LU3
- Dialling code: 01525
- Police: Bedfordshire
- Fire: Bedfordshire
- Ambulance: East of England
- UK Parliament: Mid Bedfordshire

Upper Sundon is a village located in the Central Bedfordshire district of Bedfordshire, England.

The village is the largest settlement in the wider Sundon civil parish, though Lower Sundon is presumed to be older, as the parish church (first built in the 13th Century) is located there.

The manor of Sundon is listed in the Domesday Book of 1086. The manor was held by the de Clare, Badlesmere and Scrope families until the mid 16th century, when it passed to the Cheyne family. In 1716 it was sold to William Clayton, 1st Baron Sundon. It later passed to the Page-Turner family.

Today, Upper Sundon houses most of the amenities located in the parish, including Sundon Lower School and a pub. Historically the village contained three pubs but two have since closed leaving The Red Lion as the only public house in Upper Sundon. The village is close to the large town of Luton, and is bordered on the west by the M1 motorway.

The village has a Site of Special Scientific Interest, Sundon Chalk Quarry.

The Icknield Way Path passes through the village on its 110-mile journey from Ivinghoe Beacon in Buckinghamshire to Knettishall Heath in Suffolk. The Icknield Way Trail, a multi-user route for walkers, horse riders and off-road cyclists also passes near the village.
