= Tonge, Kent =

Village in Kent, England

Coordinates: 51.3385°N 0.7758°E

Tonge
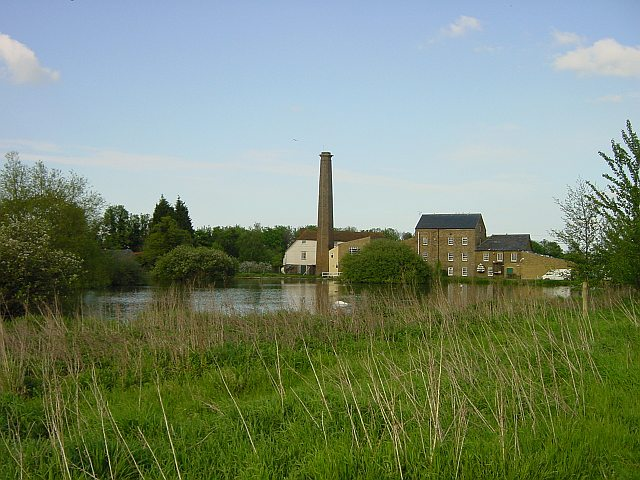
- Tonge Pond and Mill

- Location within Kent
- OS grid reference: TQ9363
- District: Swale
- Shire county: Kent
- Region: South East
- Country: England
- Sovereign state: United Kingdom
- Post town: Sittingbourne
- Postcode district: ME9
- Police: Kent
- Fire: Kent
- Ambulance: South East Coast

Tonge is a village near Sittingbourne in Kent, England. The hamlet is north of Bapchild (where at the 2011 Census the population was included), close to Murston Marshes beside the Swale.

It is mainly farmland with one road (Church Road and Blacketts Road) passing through it towards Blacketts Farm.

== History ==
In 1798, Edward Hasted records that it was once called 'Thwang' (a Saxon name).

Vortigern, King of Saxon Britain, rewarded two Saxon chiefs Hengist and Horsa after his victory over the Scots and Picts. Hengist requested, as a pledge of the king's affection, only as much land as on ox-hide could surround. This being granted, he cut the whole hide into small thongs (long, thin strips, generally of sturdy fiber or leather, typically used for binding), and inclosed within them a space of ground, this was large enough to contain a castle, which he accordingly built on it, and named it Thwang-ceastre (i. e. Thong-castle). The castle later became a ruin in the later years of the Saxon age.

Some writers record it at Thong Castle, near Grimsby, in Lincolnshire, others place it at Doncaster. Leland, Richard Kilburne (A Topographie, or Brief Survey of the County of Kent) and John Philipott (Visitation of the County of Kent, 1619) all record it near Sittigbourne. These events happened in 461, Bede and Gildas mention nothing of it in their writings, and Malmsbury tells it only as a report.

Leland also records a poor hospital called Pokeshaulle (during King Richard III of England's reign). In 1662, during Queen Mary's reign it became the hospital of St. James, of Puckleshall. It was given to Sir John Parrot.

After the Domesday Survey, the village belonged to Odo, Earl of Kent, (as the Bishop of Bayeux). After Odo's trial for fraud, the lands were then granted to 'Hugh de Port' (an English feudal barony) for the defence of Dover Castle. In 1306 Bartholomew de Badlesmere became the owner of the manor. It passed to Giles de Badlesmere, 2nd Baron Badlesmere, and then to Elizabeth de Badlesmere, Countess of Northampton, then to Roger Mortimer, 2nd Earl of March, then to Richard, Duke of York. When he died at the Battle of Wakefield in 1460, the manor was granted by King Henry VI to Thomas Browne, esquire of Beechworth Castle. His son sir George Brown in 1472, surrendered the manor to Cecily Neville, Duchess of York. In 1547, it passed to Sir Ralph Fane. He then transferred it in 1558, to Sir Rowland Clerke (whose wife was Grisold the 3rd daughter of William Paget. Who then passed it on through various private hands.

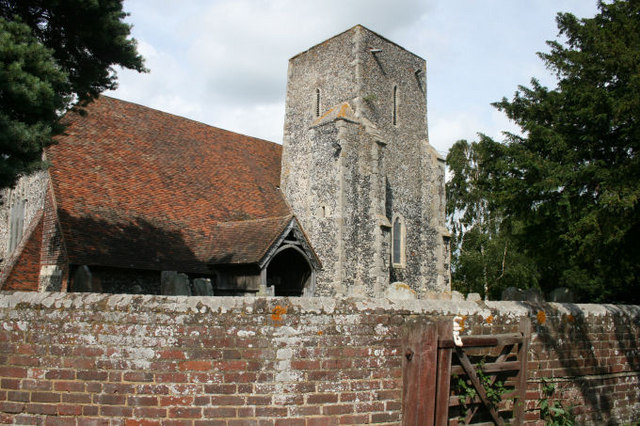
The Church of St Giles

Also in the parish is the estate of Cheeks Court (which was anciently recorded as Chicks-court). One owner in 1444, Sir William Cromer (a High Sheriff of Kent) This survives as the Grade II listed Cheke Court.

Also the estate of Newburgh, commonly called Newbarrow (which was on the southern portion of the parish (close to Lynsted). Before 1524, John Roper, esq. of Eltham had possession of it. He was attorney-general to King Henry VIII. In 1616, another owner, Sir John Roper became Lord Teynham.

In the nineteenth century the village was sometimes referred to as Tong - see for example the dedication stone on the original building of Bapchild and Tonge primary school.

The village has a parish church. The Church of St Giles, which is in the diocese of Canterbury, and deanery of Sittingbourne. This is Grade I listed.

== See also ==
- Listed buildings in Tonge, Kent
