= Elizabeth Fitzalan, Duchess of Norfolk =

English noblewoman

Elizabeth de Mowbray
- Duchess of Norfolk
- Born: Lady Elizabeth Fitzalan; 1366
- Died: 8 July 1425 (aged 58–59); Wighill, Yorkshire
- Spouses: Sir William Montacut; Thomas de Mowbray, 1st Duke of Norfolk; Sir Robert Goushill; Sir Gerard Usflete
- Issue: Thomas de Mowbray, 4th Earl of Norfolk; Margaret de Mowbray; John Mowbray, 2nd Duke of Norfolk; Isabel de Mowbray; Elizabeth de Mowbray; Elizabeth Goushill; Joan Goushill
- Father: Richard Fitzalan, 4th Earl of Arundel
- Mother: Elizabeth de Bohun

Elizabeth de Mowbray, Duchess of Norfolk (née Lady Elizabeth Fitzalan; 8 July 1366 – 8 July 1425) was an English noblewoman and the wife of Thomas Mowbray, 1st Duke of Norfolk.

Through her eldest daughter, Lady Margaret Mowbray, Elizabeth was an ancestress of Queens consort Anne Boleyn and Katherine Howard, and the Howard Dukes of Norfolk. Her other notable descendants include Charles Brandon, 1st Duke of Suffolk; Thomas Stanley, 1st Earl of Derby; Sir Thomas Wyatt, the younger; and Lady Jane Grey (through both parents).

== Marriages and children ==
Lady Elizabeth was born in Derbyshire, England, a daughter of Richard Fitzalan, 4th Earl of Arundel and his first wife Elizabeth de Bohun, daughter of William de Bohun, 1st Earl of Northampton and Elizabeth de Badlesmere.

Elizabeth had four husbands and at least seven children:

- Sir William Montacute, the eldest son of William de Montagu, 2nd Earl of Salisbury (before December 1378).
- Thomas de Mowbray, 1st Duke of Norfolk (1384), married July 1384.
  - Thomas de Mowbray, 4th Earl of Norfolk (b. 17 September 1385)
  - Margaret de Mowbray (b. 1388), who married Sir Robert Howard (1385–1436) of Stoke by Nayland in Suffolk, by whom she was the mother of John Howard, 1st Duke of Norfolk.
  - John de Mowbray, 2nd Duke of Norfolk (b. 1392)
  - Isabel de Mowbray (b. 1396), married James Berkeley, 1st Baron Berkeley
  - Elizabeth de Mowbray (b.1398), who married Michael de la Pole, 3rd Earl of Suffolk.
- Sir Robert Goushill or Gousell of Hoveringham, Nottinghamshire (d. 21 July 1403), married before 19 August 1401.
  - Elizabeth Goushill or Gousell (b. c. 1402), wife of Sir Robert Wingfield of Letheringham, Suffolk (c. 1403–1451), they were great-grandparents to Charles Brandon, 1st Duke of Suffolk.
  - Joan or Jean Goushill or Gousell (b. c. 1403), wife of Thomas Stanley, 1st Baron Stanley, Lord of Mann, and parents of Thomas Stanley, 1st Earl of Derby. Through their daughter Katherine, they are ancestors of U.S. President James Madison.
- Sir Gerard Usflete, son of Sir Gerard Usflete (d. 1406), MP, married before 3 July 1414.

She died 8 July 1425 in Wighill, Yorkshire, and was buried with her third husband in St. Michael's Church, Hoveringham, Nottinghamshire.

== Ancestry ==
Ancestors of Lady Elizabeth FitzAlan

8. Edmund FitzAlan, 9th Earl of Arundel
4. Richard FitzAlan, 10th Earl of Arundel
9. Alice de Warenne
2. Richard FitzAlan, 11th Earl of Arundel
10. Henry, 3rd Earl of Lancaster
5. Eleanor of Lancaster
11. Maud Chaworth
1. Elizabeth FitzAlan
12. Humphrey de Bohun, 4th Earl of Hereford
6. William de Bohun, 1st Earl of Northampton
13. Elizabeth of Rhuddlan
3. Elizabeth de Bohun
14. Bartholomew de Badlesmere, 1st Baron Badlesmere
7. Elizabeth de Badlesmere
15. Margaret de Clare
