= Listed buildings in Tonge, Kent =

Civil Parish in Kent, England

Tonge is a village and civil parish in the Swale District of Kent, England. It contains 19 listed buildings that are recorded in the National Heritage List for England. Of these one is grade I, two are grade II* and 16 are grade II.

This list is based on the information retrieved online from Historic England .

== Key ==
| Grade | Criteria |
|---|---|
| I | Buildings that are of exceptional interest |
| II* | Particularly important buildings of more than special interest |
| II | Buildings that are of special interest |

== Listing ==
| Name | Grade | Location | Type | Completed (Note: The date given is the date used by Historic England as significant for the initial building or that of an important part in the structure's description.) | Date designated | Grid ref. (Note: The grid reference is based on the British national grid reference system, sometimes known as OSGB36, used by the Ordnance Survey.) Geo-coordinates | Notes | Entry number (Note: The "List Entry Number" is a unique number assigned to each listed building and scheduled monument by Historic England.) | Image | Wikidata |
|---|---|---|---|---|---|---|---|---|---|---|
| Cheke Court | II | Blacketts Road | | | 21 March 1985 | TQ9403864800; 51°20′57″N 0°47′06″E | | 1343948 | Upload Photo | Q26627709 |
| Fox Cottage | II | Blacketts Road | | | 21 March 1985 | TQ9408864813; 51°20′57″N 0°47′09″E | | 1121527 | Upload Photo | Q26414692 |
| West Tonge Farm | II | 1 and 2, Church Road | | | 21 March 1985 | TQ9321164281; 51°20′41″N 0°46′22″E | | 1069266 | Upload Photo | Q26322111 |
| Church of St Giles | I | Church Road | church building | | 24 January 1967 | TQ9342464035; 51°20′33″N 0°46′33″E | | 1322821 | Church of St Giles More images | Q17530128 |
| Granary 20 Yards South of West Tonge Farmhouse | II | Church Road | | | 21 March 1985 | TQ9324064260; 51°20′40″N 0°46′24″E | | 1343949 | Upload Photo | Q26627710 |
| Mill House Old Mill | II | Church Road | | | 21 March 1985 | TQ9344863599; 51°20′19″N 0°46′33″E | | 1069265 | Upload Photo | Q26322109 |
| Stables 30 Yards East of West Tonge Farmhouse | II | Church Road | | | 21 March 1985 | TQ9325364293; 51°20′41″N 0°46′25″E | | 1338157 | Upload Photo | Q26622504 |
| Tonge Mill | II | Church Road | | | 27 August 1952 | TQ9344163568; 51°20′18″N 0°46′33″E | | 1338569 | Upload Photo | Q26622883 |
| Newbury Farm House North | II* | Dully Road | | | 24 January 1967 | TQ9279859946; 51°18′21″N 0°45′53″E | | 1069267 | Upload Photo | Q17546253 |
| Bax Farmhouse | II* | London Road | | | 27 August 1952 | TQ9435963823; 51°20′25″N 0°47′21″E | | 1338557 | Upload Photo | Q17546479 |
| Beeches | II | London Road | | | 21 March 1985 | TQ9409762845; 51°19′54″N 0°47′05″E | | 1121878 | Upload Photo | Q26415020 |
| Little Radfield | II | London Road | | | 29 October 1973 | TQ9412562828; 51°19′53″N 0°47′07″E | | 1343950 | Upload Photo | Q26627711 |
| Radfield House and Railings to Forecourt | II | London Road | | | 24 January 1967 | TQ9400662848; 51°19′54″N 0°47′01″E | | 1069268 | Upload Photo | Q26322114 |
| Bunces Farm | II | 1-2, Scrapes Hill | | | 24 January 1967 | TQ9376663804; 51°20′25″N 0°46′50″E | | 1069269 | Upload Photo | Q26322116 |
| Barn 20 Yards North West of Bunces Farmhouse | II | Scrapes Hill | | | 21 March 1985 | TQ9376763830; 51°20′26″N 0°46′50″E | | 1121884 | Upload Photo | Q26415025 |
| The Old Vicarage | II | Sittingbourne, ME9 9NP | | | 21 April 2022 | TQ9346862760; 51°19′52″N 0°46′33″E | | 1480835 | Upload Photo | Q111853422 |
| Tonge Corner Farmhouse | II | Tonge Corner | | | 24 January 1967 | TQ9388265218; 51°21′11″N 0°46′59″E | | 1069270 | Upload Photo | Q26322118 |
| Woodstreet Cottage | II | Woodstreet | | | 27 August 1952 | TQ9381561682; 51°19′16″N 0°46′48″E | | 1069271 | Upload Photo | Q26322120 |
| Woodstreet House | II | Woodstreet | | | 24 January 1967 | TQ9378461644; 51°19′15″N 0°46′47″E | | 1121893 | Upload Photo | Q26415034 |

== See also ==
- Grade I listed buildings in Kent
- Grade II* listed buildings in Kent

== Sources ==
- Newman, John (2013) [1969], Kent: North-East and East, The Buildings of England, New Haven and London: Yale University Press, ISBN 978-0-300-18506-5
