= Lower Sundon =

Hamlet in Bedfordshire, England

Coordinates: 51.94204°N 0.45679°W

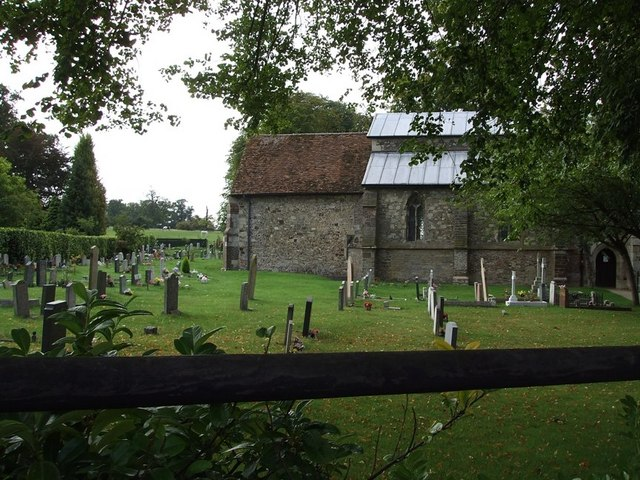
- Church of St Mary

- Location within Bedfordshire
- OS grid reference: TL061281
- Civil parish: Sundon
- Unitary authority: Central Bedfordshire
- Ceremonial county: Bedfordshire
- Region: East
- Country: England
- Sovereign state: United Kingdom
- Post town: LUTON
- Postcode district: LU3
- Dialling code: 01582
- Police: Bedfordshire
- Fire: Bedfordshire
- Ambulance: East of England
- UK Parliament: Mid Bedfordshire

Lower Sundon is a hamlet located in the Central Bedfordshire district of Bedfordshire, England.

The settlement was established before 1066. The manor of Sundon is listed in the Domesday Book of 1086. The manor was held by the de Clare, Badlesmere and Scrope families until the mid 16th century, when it passed to the Cheyne family. In 1716 it was sold to William Clayton, 1st Baron Sundon. It later passed to the Page-Turner family.

The St Mary the Virgin Church was first built in Lower Sundon in the 13th Century. It is a Grade I listed building. The Victorian vicarage is Grade II listed, and features very fine latticed windows.

Today, Lower Sundon lies in the wider Sundon civil parish, and is close to the large town of Luton.
