= Sundon =

- Civil parish
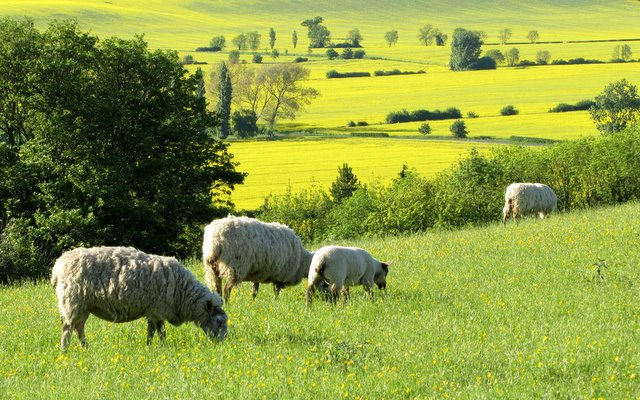
- View from Sundon Hills Country Park
- Interactive map of Sundon
- Coordinates: 51°56′20″N 0°28′48″W
- Country: England
- Primary council: Central Bedfordshire
- County: Bedfordshire
- Region: East of England
- Status: Parish
- Main settlements: Lower Sundon; Upper Sundon

Government
  - Type: Parish Council
  - UK Parliament: Mid Bedfordshire

Population
  - Total: 478
- Website: Sundon Parish Council

Sundon is a civil parish in the English county of Bedfordshire.

There are two settlements: the one called Upper Sundon at the top of the hill is now the main village, and the presumably older one by the church is now a hamlet called Lower Sundon.

Sundon Lower School is located in the village of Upper Sundon. Sundon has a village hall and a pub, the Red Lion.

The manor of Sundon is listed in the Domesday Book of 1086. The manor was held by the de Clare, Badlesmere and Scrope families until the mid 16th century, when it passed to the Cheyne family. In 1716 it was sold to William Clayton, 1st Baron Sundon. It later passed to the Page-Turner family.

The parish church, dedicated to St Mary, is a Grade I listed building. It dates back largely to the 14th century, with some 13th century elements. The Victorian vicarage is Grade II listed, and features very fine latticed windows.

Because of changes to its boundary, the parish no longer includes Sundon Park (which is now an area of Luton) or the "Sundon Substation" of the National Grid for electricity (which lies west of the railway, near the village of Chalton).
