= Giles de Badlesmere, 2nd Baron Badlesmere =

English nobleman

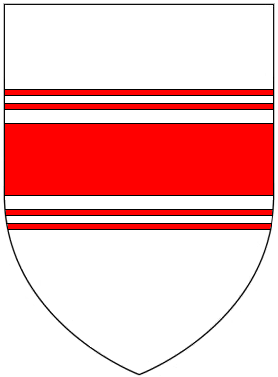
Arms of Badlesmere: Argent, a fess between two bars gemeles gules. As blazoned for Guncelin de Badlesmere, on the Herald's Roll of Arms also on The Camden Roll & St George's Roll

Giles de Badlesmere, 2nd Baron Badlesmere (18 October 1314 – 7 June 1338) was an English nobleman.

== Background and Biography ==
The son and heir of Bartholomew de Badlesmere, 1st Baron Badlesmere and his wife Margaret de Clare, he was born at Hambleton, Rutland.

Giles' father was executed in April 1322 for having participated in the Earl of Lancaster's rebellion against King Edward II of England. After Bartholomew had joined the rebels, his wife and their children were arrested and sent to the Tower of London because she refused to admit the Queen consort Isabella to Leeds Castle which had been granted to Bartholomew. His title and estates were attainted, therefore Giles did not immediately succeed to the barony on his father's death.

In November 1328, Giles obtained a reversal of the attainder and succeeded by writ of summons as the 2nd Baron Badlesmere. However, when he died in June 1338, the barony of Badlesmere fell into abeyance as his marriage to Elizabeth Montagu had not produced children.

== Property ==
Records of numerous inquisitions post mortem that were held in the summer of 1338 demonstrate that Giles' extensive possessions were to be found in London, Kent and 13 other counties as well as Ireland. Apart from the assets reserved to his widow, Giles' estates went to his four sisters as coheirs. The evidence given at each hearing rested on local knowledge and there were some inconsistencies about the names of the sisters and their precise ages. However, taken as a whole, it is clear from the inquisition records that the names of the sisters were as follows, listed in descending order of age:

- Margery de Badlesmere, married William de Ros, 2nd Baron de Ros, then Thomas de Arundel
- Maud de Badlesmere, married John de Vere, 7th Earl of Oxford
- Elizabeth de Badlesmere, married Sir Edmund Mortimer, then William de Bohun, 1st Earl of Northampton
- Margaret de Badlesmere, married John Tiptoft, 2nd Baron Tibetot

== Ancestry ==
Ancestors of Giles de Badlesmere, 2nd Baron Badlesmere

Bartholomew de Badlesmere
Gunselm de Badlesmere
Bartholomew de Badlesmere, 1st Baron Badlesmere
John de Lacy, 2nd Earl of Lincoln
Maud de Lacy, Countess of Gloucester
Margaret de Quincy
Giles de Badlesmere
Richard de Clare, 6th Earl of Hertford
Thomas de Clare, Lord of Thomond
Maud de Lacy
Margaret de Clare
Maurice FitzGerald, 3rd Lord of Offaly
Juliana FitzGerald
Maud de Prendergast

== Notes ==
Peerage of England
Preceded by Bartholomew de Badlesmere	Baron Badlesmere; 1328–1338	Abeyant
