= John Northwood, 1st Baron Northwood =

Landowner, soldier and administrator from Kent

John Northwood (1254–1319), who became the first Baron Northwood, was an English landowner, soldier and administrator from Kent.

== Origins ==
Born on 24 June 1254, he was the son and heir of Roger Northwood, who died on 9 November 1285, and his first wife Bona Waltham.

== Career ==
In 1278 he had a position in the household of Robert Kilwardby, Archbishop of Canterbury and, after succeeding his father in 1285, was chosen as High Sheriff of Kent in 1291, sitting also on the commission of oyer and terminer for the county. Further tenures as sheriff followed in 1299 and 1304, the third being accepted reluctantly. Summoned by King Edward I to an urgent assembly of notables in 1294, he was excused joining the military expedition to Aquitaine. However he was summoned to the war in Flanders in 1297 but may not have attended in person, being an assessor of tax for Sussex that year. From 1298 to 1319 he was regularly summoned to the war in Scotland, serving in person or sending deputies, and combined these duties with a wide range of administrative posts in his native Kent.

After being knighted by the King at the Siege of Caerlaverock in 1300, he and his wife were invited in 1308 to the coronation of the new King Edward II. In 1313 he was summoned to Parliament as a baron, which can be taken as the creation of a hereditary peerage, and was continuously summoned for the rest of his life. In 1317 he and his eldest son were deputed to escort two cardinals from Dover to London, on a mission from the Vatican to help negotiate a peace between England and Scotland, and in 1318 he was referred to as one of the country's “major barons”.

He died on 26 May 1319 and is commemorated by a brass in the church of Minster-in-Sheppey His arms, recorded on the Parliamentary roll, were: ermine, a cross engrailed gules. His eldest son having died before him, his lands and title were inherited by his grandson Roger.

== Family ==
About 1275 he married Joan Badlesmere, daughter of Sir Guncelin Badlesmere, and they had six sons. She died on 2 June 1319, a week after her husband, and is also commemorated by a brass at Minster-in-Sheppey.

Their eldest son was John Northwood, who in 1306 married Agnes Grandison (died 1349), daughter of William Grandison, 1st Baron Grandison, but died before his father in 1318. His eldest son was Roger Northwood, 2nd Baron Northwood, and another son was the cleric and academic John Northwood.
