= Charter of Liberties =

Written proclamation by Henry I of England

The Charter of Liberties (Latin: Carta Libertatum), also called the Coronation Charter, or Statutes of the Realm, was a written proclamation by Henry I of England, issued upon his accession to the throne in 1100. It sought to bind the King to certain laws regarding the treatment of nobles, church officials, and individuals. The nineteenth-century historians Frederick Maitland and Frederick Pollock considered it a landmark document in English legal history and a forerunner of Magna Carta. It was issued in Latin, Anglo-Norman and Old English versions, a sign of the increasing status of the English language at the time.

The document addressed abuses of royal power by his predecessor William II (Henry's brother, r. 1087–1100), as perceived by the nobility, specifically the over-taxation of the barons, the abuse of vacant sees, and the practices of simony and pluralism.

The Charter of Liberties was generally ignored by subsequent English kings, until in 1213 Stephen Langton, Archbishop of Canterbury, reminded the nobles that their liberties had been guaranteed over a century prior in Henry I's Charter of Liberties.

== Background ==
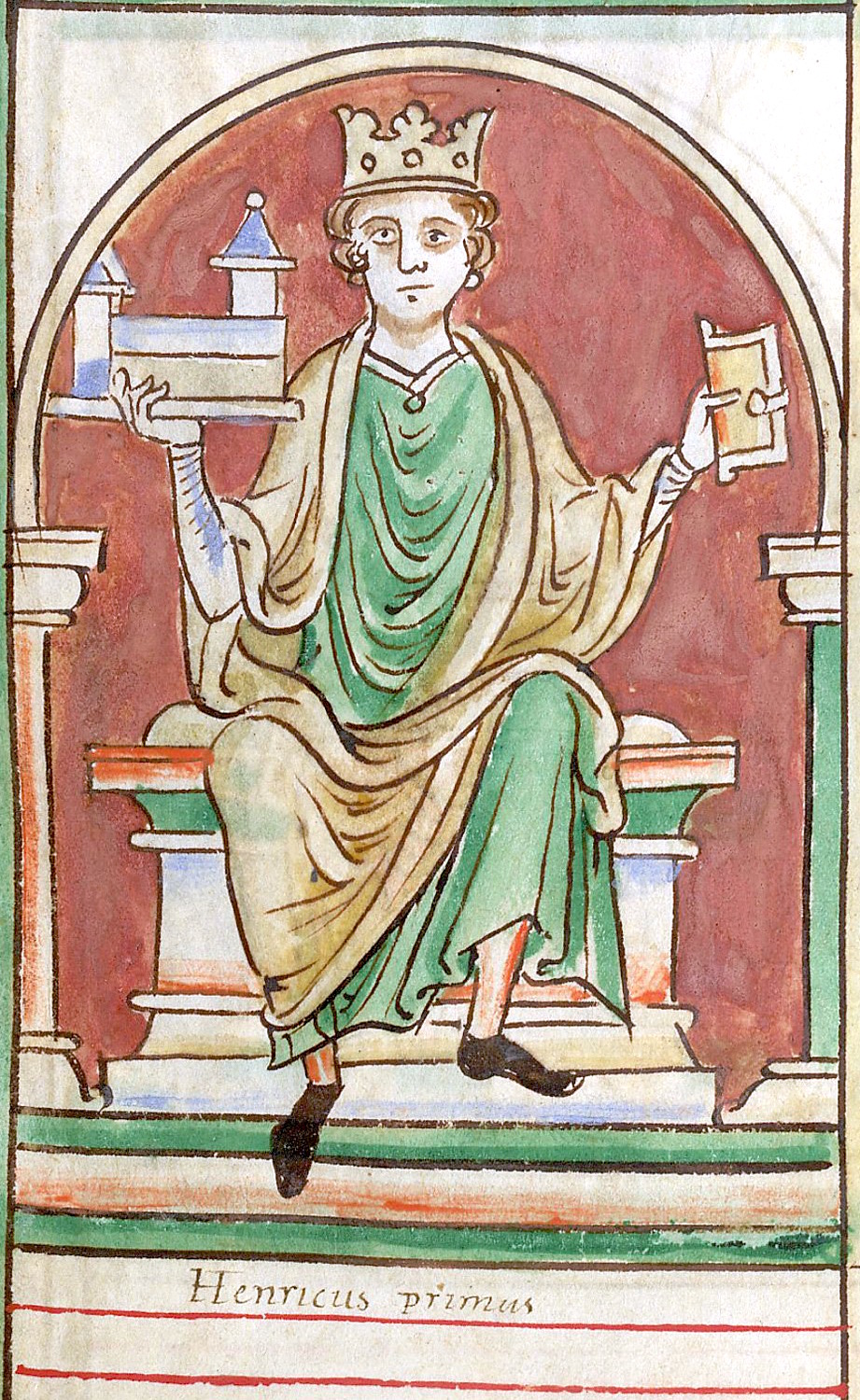
Henry I of England was forced to make concessions to the barons in the Charter of Liberties when he assumed the throne in 1100.

Henry I of England, nicknamed Beauclerc, was the fourth and youngest son of William I (William the Conqueror) by his queen Matilda of Flanders. The name Beauclerc was given because Henry was well educated, being able to read and write Latin, and possessed a knowledge of English law and natural history. He had received 5,000 pounds of silver from his father, but no land holdings. He used this to purchase a district in the Cotentin Peninsula in Normandy for 3,000 pounds from his brother Robert of Normandy. Robert had been left the Duchy of Normandy by their father, but needed money. Various political intrigues occurred in France, which led to the imprisonment of Henry for two years by his brother William II, then King of England. In 1096, Robert left Normandy for the First Crusade. Henry swore fealty to William, who took over Normandy in Robert's absence. William was killed in a hunting accident on 2 August 1100. (Henry was present on this hunting trip.) With William dead and Robert absent, Henry claimed the English crown.

Henry was immediately faced with three political problems

- The earls and barons did not accept him.
- There was antagonism from the Church, especially Archbishop Anselm of Canterbury.
- The native Anglo-Saxon population was not receptive to the new king.

Henry made concessions to the Church and reconciled with Anselm. He married Edith, the daughter of King Malcolm III of Scotland, who was of mixed English and Scottish heritage, and so garnered great favour with the Anglo-Saxons. She changed her name to the Norman "Mathilda." However, the choice displeased the barons and earls. Henry needed to mollify the nobles and secure his throne.

William II had issued a charter in 1093, when he was ill and fearing death. The text of this charter has been lost to history. It is believed to have freed prisoners, forgiven debts, and assured that holy and good laws would be maintained. Whatever promises William made, he quickly broke after he recovered his health.

Henry went further. He negotiated with the leading barons and earls, making various concessions to them. When all sides were agreed, the agreement was issued as the Charter of Liberties.

== Summary ==
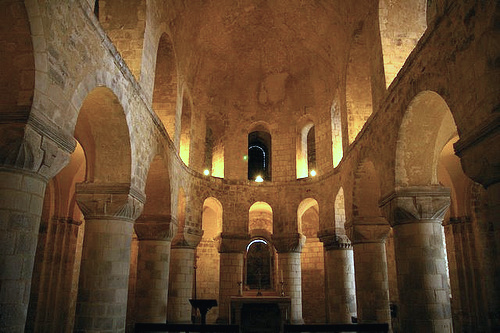
The Charter was issued from the Norman Chapel in the Tower of London in 1100.

After a traditional greeting, the Charter of Liberties contained fourteen declarations, summarised as follows:

Henry, king of the English, to Bishop Samson and Urso de Abetot and all his barons and faithful, both French and English, of Worcestershire, [copies were sent to all the shires] greeting.

1. I, Henry, by the grace of God having been crowned the King of England, shall not take or sell any property from a Church upon the death of a bishop or abbot, until a successor has been named to that Church property. I shall end all the oppressive practices which have been an evil presence in England.
2. If any baron or earl of mine shall die, his heirs shall not be forced to purchase their inheritance, but shall retrieve it through force of law and custom.
3. Any baron or earl who wishes to betroth his daughter or other women kinsfolk in marriage should consult me first, but I will not stand in the way of any prudent marriage. Any widow who wishes to remarry should consult with me, but I shall abide by the wishes of her close relatives, the other barons and earls. I will not allow her to marry one of my enemies.
4. Any wife of my barons, who becomes a widow shall not be denied her dowry. She should be allowed to remarry according to her wishes, so long as she maintains the integrity of her body, in a lawful manner. Barons overseeing the children of a dead baron shall maintain their land and interest in a lawful manner.
5. Common seigniorages took in the cities and counties, which was not taken in the time of Edward I (Edward the Confessor), shall henceforth be forbidden.
6. I shall remit [cancel] all debts and pleas which were owing to my brother, except those which were lawfully made through an inheritance.
7. If any of my barons should grow feeble, and give away money or other possessions, these shall be honored, so long as the heirs are properly remembered. Gifts given by feeble barons under force of arms shall not be enforced.
8. If any of my barons commit a crime, he shall not bind himself to the crown with a payment as was done in the time of my father and brother, but shall stand for the crime as was custom and law before the time of my father, and make amends as are appropriate. Anyone guilty of treachery or other heinous crime shall make proper amends.
9. I forgive all murders committed before I was crowned. Subsequent murders shall stand before the justice of the Crown.
10. With the common consent of my barons, I shall maintain all the forests as was done in the time of my father.
11. Those knights who render military service and horses shall not be required to give grain or other farm goods to me.
12. I impose a strict peace on the land and command it be maintained.
13. I restore the law of King Edward and the amendments which my father introduced upon the advice of his barons.
14. Anything taken from me after the death of my father shall be returned immediately, without fine. If it is not returned, a heavy fine shall be enforced.

Witnesses Maurice bishop of London, and William bishop elect of Winchester, and Gerard bishop of Hereford, and earl Henry, and earl Simon, and Walter Giffard, and Robert de Montfort, and Roger Bigot, and Eudo the steward, and Robert son of Hamo, and Robert Malet. At London when I was crowned. Farewell.

== Aftermath ==
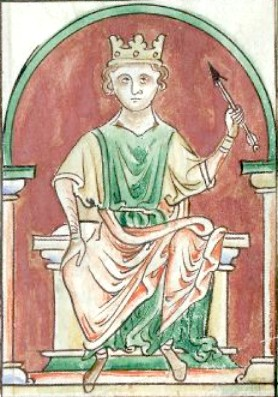
William II of England was killed in a hunting accident, allowing his brother, Henry I of England to assume the throne in 1100.

William I had been a great admirer of the laws of Edward the Confessor. He had reformed many laws in an effort to make the law of Edward the common law of England while establishing a strong Norman rule and custom. During the entire Norman period, there was little legislation.

Henry began his reign with the Charter of Liberties, sending a strong message: he was returning to his father's ways, which were viewed with great nostalgia. The perceived abuses of William II were to be abolished. The corruption and larceny of reliefs, wardships, marriages, murder fines and so forth, was to end. Debts and past offences were to be forgiven. The demesne lands and military tenants were to be freed from the danegeld of Danelaw. Above all, the "laga Eadwardii" Law of Edward the Confessor, as amended by William I, would be restored. The proclamation was made with the assumption that the barons would make the same concessions to their tenants as the king had promised to them. Plucknett is of the opinion that this good will probably did flow down the feudal chain. The Charter was not legislation, but rather a promise to return to the law, as it existed in the time of William I, before it had been corrupted by William II.

The promises made in the Charter could not be enforced. There is ample evidence that Henry I ignored them. The Pipe Rolls which came thirty-one years into Henry's reign indicate he had extended the power of the crown well beyond the limits set in the Charter. The establishment of the Exchequer, ostensibly to end corruption and fraud in the taking and holding of taxes, in reality, led to greater power of the crown. The direction of its chief minister, Bishop Roger of Salisbury, evolved the law for tenants in chief which became the harshest and most severe in Europe. This occurred silently, and placed precedent upon precedent. Early in his reign, Henry issued a writ declaring the county and hundred courts should be held as in the days of Edward the Confessor. These had the result of bringing the ancient traditional tribunals in accordance with newer Norman methods. Chroniclers of the age state that Henry legislated about theft, restored capital punishment (which had been suspended for a great many crimes by William II), and harshly treated utterers of bad money and rapacious exactions of his courtiers. He made his roving court and army the terror of every neighborhood. Henry made the measure of his own arm the standard ell.

The drowning of his son, William, in the loss of the White Ship in 1120, led to the end of the Norman dynasty. Stephen of England claimed the throne in 1135. He was the last Norman king. His conflict with Henry's daughter Matilda led to The Anarchy.

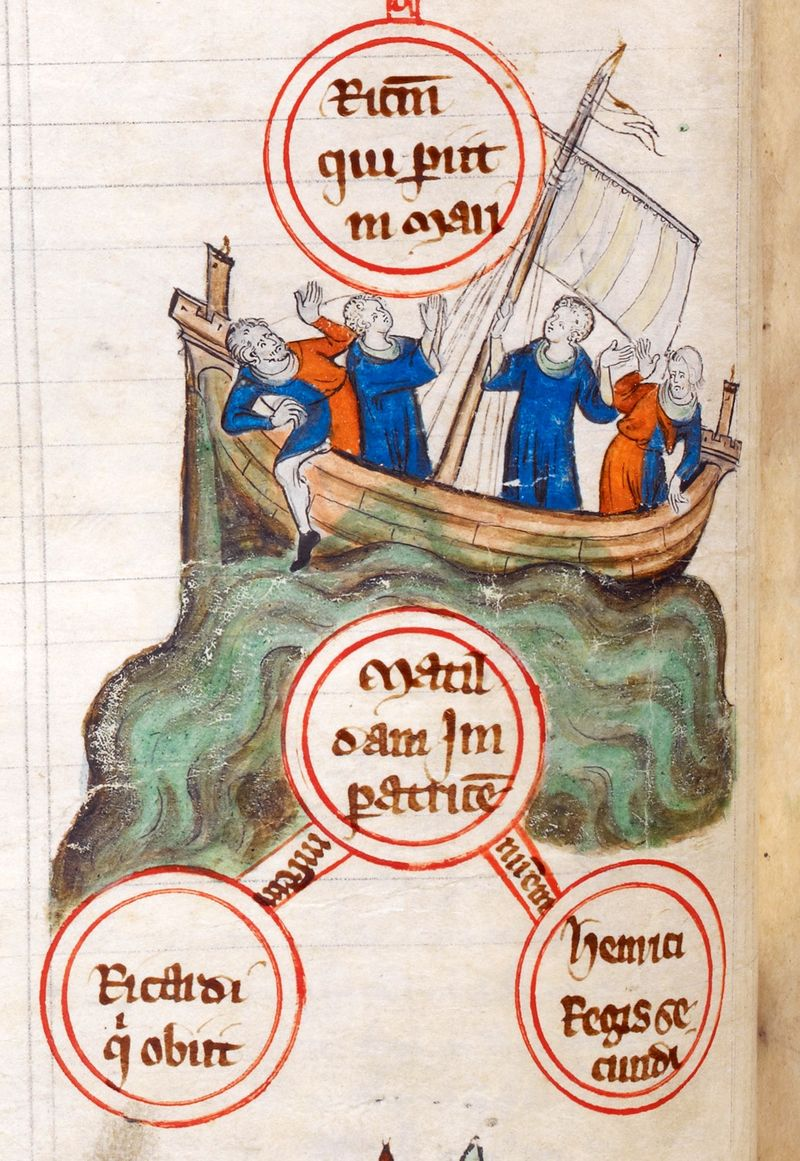
The sinking of the White Ship in 1120, drowning Henry's heir, William, effectively marked the end of the Norman era in England.

Plucknett describes the Charter of Liberties as a forerunner to legislation in later years. There was no legislation as such either under the Saxons or the Normans. The Charter was a great concession, born of political need. Large portions of the charter were a withdrawal of practices which were of questionable legality, and corrosive politically. Various feudal dues, instead of being arbitrary and ad hoc, were declared to be reduced to reasonable limits. The Charter led to an obscure decree of Stephen (1135–1154), the statutum decretum that established where there was no son, daughters would inherit. This was remarkable in its day, and pre-dated the reforms of Henry II of England.

The problems with the Church had been brewing for some time. William I had tried to invest bishops with his temporal seal. Pope Gregory VII in 1075 had prohibited lay investiture, holding the Church was independent of the state. A long struggle ensued. This was still going on when Henry I assumed the throne and entered into open conflict with Anselm. This conflict was moderated and ameliorated by the canon lawyer Ivo of Chartres. It was agreed that Henry could observe the selection of bishops, without interference. This accord was extended to all of Europe by 1122. The Concordat of Worms in 1122 did not last, but only changed the nature of tension between Church and State. The government of Henry I at Westminster became exquisitely effective. The mechanism of Norman government needed a strong hand. Stephen was not up to it. Henry's death was viewed as a great tragedy for several centuries:

Then there was tribulation soon in the land, for every man that could forthwith robbed another...A good man he [Henry I] was, there was great awe of him. No man durst misdo against another in his time. He made peace for man and beast. Whoso bare his burden of gold and silver, no man durst say aught but good.

During the reign of Stephen, Henry I came to be known as the "Lion of Justice".

The Charter of Liberties was a precedent for Magna Carta (Great Charter) of 1215, at the end of the reign of John of England.
