= Beatrice, Countess of Arundel =

Portuguese noble

Beatrice of Portugal
- Countess of Arundel; Countess of Huntingdon
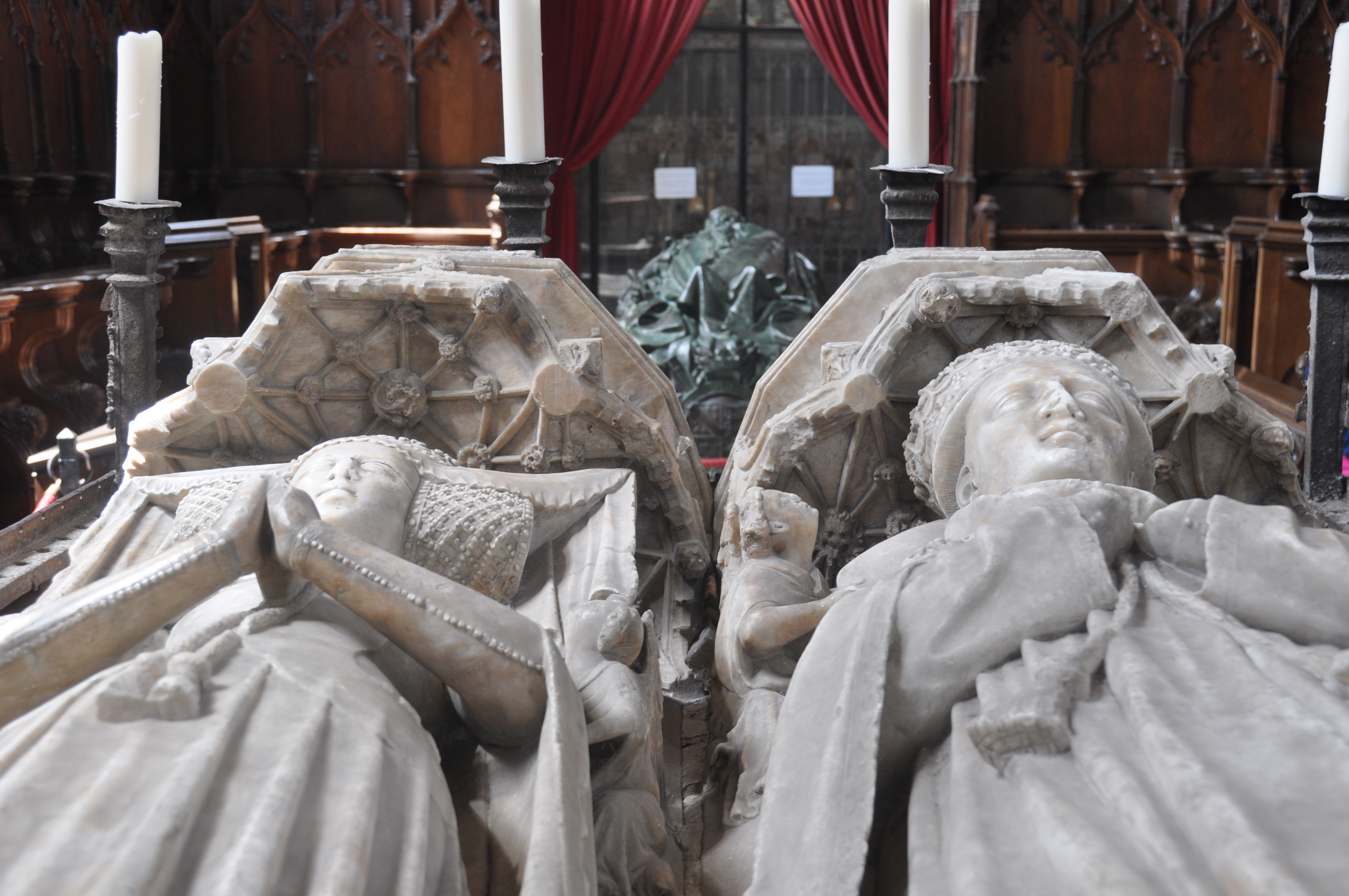
- Fitzalan Chapel at Arundel Castle - Statues 2 Funeral Effigy at Arundel Chapel
- Born: c. 1380; Veiros, Alentejo, Portugal
- Died: November 1439 (aged 59); Bordeaux, France
- Buried: Fitzalan Chapel, Sussex
- Spouses: Thomas Fitzalan, 12th Earl of Arundel (m. 1405; died 1415) John Holland, 2nd Duke of Exeter (m. 1432)
- Father: John I of Portugal
- Mother: Inês Pires

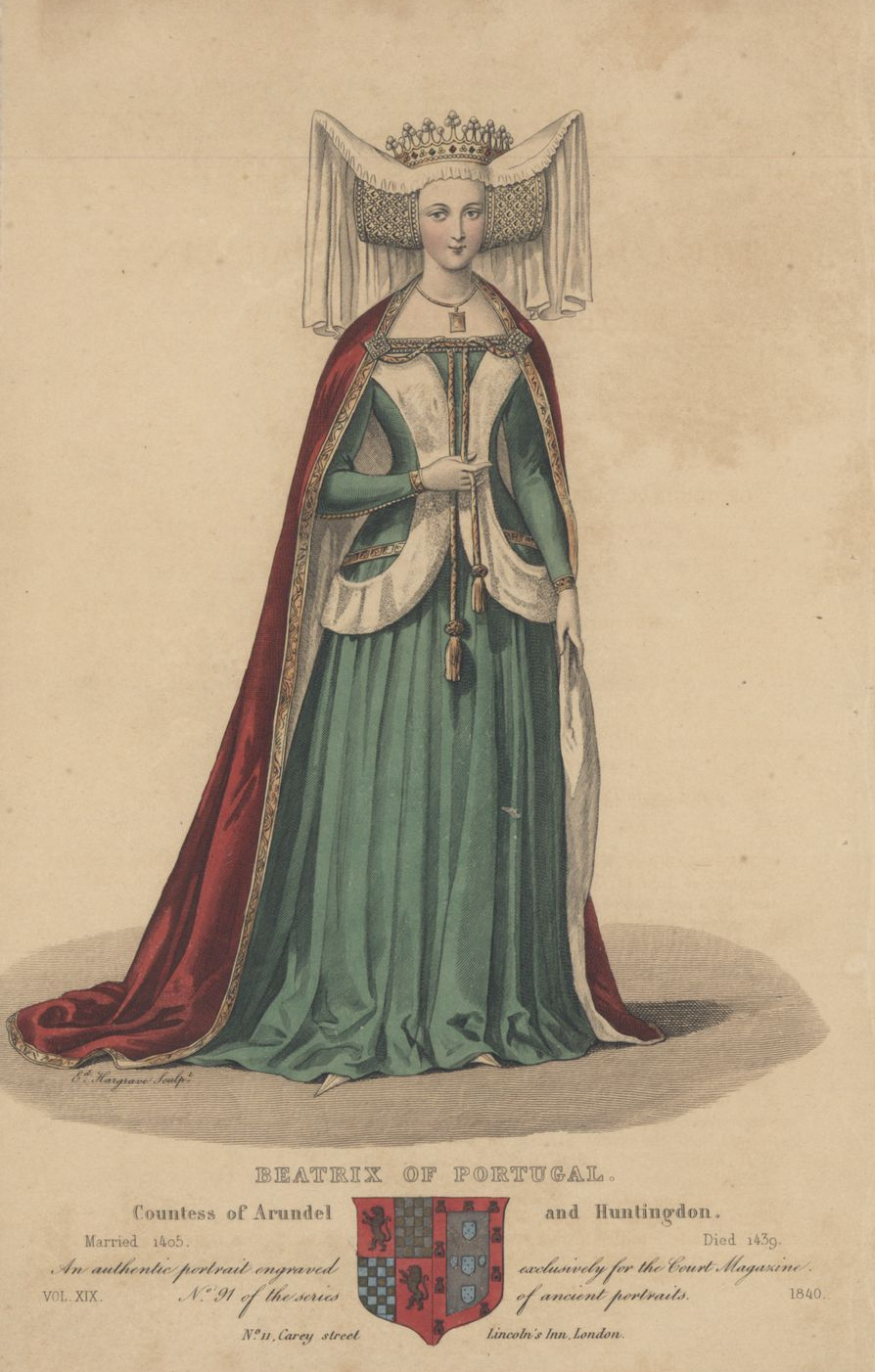
Beatrice of Portugal, Countess of Arundel

Beatrice of Portugal (Portuguese: Beatriz [bi.ɐˈtɾiʃ]; c. 1380 – November 1439), LG, was a natural daughter of John I of Portugal and Inês Pires, born before the marriage of her father with Philippa of Lancaster, daughter of John of Gaunt. She was a sister of Afonso, Duke of Braganza and half-sister of King Edward of Portugal, Infante Peter, Duke of Coimbra, Henry the Navigator, Isabella of Portugal, Duchess of Burgundy, John, Constable of Portugal, and Ferdinand the Saint Prince. Queen Philippa was in charge of the education of both of her husband's children out of wedlock.

Beatrice was born c. 1380, possibly in Veiros, Alentejo, Portugal. Some say that her mother Inês Pires was "the daughter of a Jewish cobbler." But others say she came from an old Portuguese noble line. In April 1405 her wedding with Thomas Fitzalan, 12th Earl of Arundel by proxy was celebrated in Lisbon and, in the same year, she travelled to England, accompanied by her brother Afonso and many of the king's vassals and her ladies-in-waiting where the marriage ceremony took place on 26 November 1405 in London, with King Henry IV in attendance.

Thomas died on 13 October 1415. Beatrice then married John Holland, 2nd Earl of Huntingdon, nephew of her stepmother Queen Philippa, in 1432. She is sometimes confused with another Portuguese lady, Beatrice Pinto, wife of Gilbert Talbot and Thomas Fittiplace. It is unknown if Beatrice had children from any of her marriages. Beatrice died in Bordeaux, France in November 1439. After her death her husband married Lady Anne Montagu.

== Ancestry ==
Ancestors of Beatrice, Countess of Arundel

8. Afonso IV of Portugal
4. Peter I of Portugal
9. Beatrice of Castile
2. John I of Portugal
10. Lourenço Martins
5. Teresa Lourenço
11. Sancha Martins
1. Beatrice of Portugal
12. Estevão Peres
6. Pero Esteves, o Barbadão
13. Leonor Anes
3. Inês Pires
14. Joane Anes Marceiro
7. Maria Anes
15. Constança Garcês

== Bibliography ==
- Elbl, Martin Malcolm (2023). "The Pregnant Abbess: Sex, Social 'Norms', and Nuns in the Lower Douro Valley Southern Hill Country, 1410s – 1440s". Portuguese Studies Review 31 (2) (2023). Peterborough - Toronto: PSR. pp. 7–69..
- Rodrigues Oliveira, Ana (2010). Rainhas medievais de Portugal. Dezassete mulheres, duas dinastias, quatro séculos de História (in Portuguese). Lisbon: A esfera dos livros. ISBN 978-989-626-261-7.
- Santos Silva, Manuela (2007). "O casamento de D. Beatriz de Portugal (filha natural de D. João I) com Thomas Fitzalan (Conde de Arundel) – paradigma documental da negociaçião de uma aliança". Problematizar a História (in Portuguese). Casal de Cambra: Caleidoscópio. pp. 77–91. OCLC 828194156. Archived from the original on 13 November 2023.
