= Thomas de Mowbray, 4th Earl of Norfolk =

English nobleman (1385–1405)

Thomas de Mowbray, 4th Earl of Norfolk, 2nd Earl of Nottingham, 8th Baron Segrave, 7th Baron Mowbray (17 September 1385 – 8 June 1405), English nobleman and rebel, was the son of Thomas de Mowbray, 1st Duke of Norfolk, and Lady Elizabeth FitzAlan.

Arms of Thomas Mowbray, Surrey Roll, ca.1395

Upon the death of his father in Venice, he succeeded him as Earl of Norfolk and Nottingham, but not as Duke of Norfolk. He also received his father's title of Earl Marshal, but on a strictly honorary basis, the military rank being held by Ralph Neville, 1st Earl of Westmorland, as the Marshal of England. He was betrothed to Constance Holland, daughter of John Holland, 1st Duke of Exeter, then a child, but the marriage was never consummated.

He became involved with the latest rebellion of the Percies in the north, and raised an army with Richard le Scrope, Archbishop of York. Deserted by the Earl of Northumberland, Norfolk and Scrope were brought to book on Shipton Moor by a large royal army under John of Lancaster and the Earl of Westmorland. Seeking a parley, they were arrested as soon as they disbanded their followers. When Chief Justice Sir William Gascoigne refused to pass sentence upon them before they were tried by their peers, Henry IV had both Norfolk and Scrope summarily beheaded in York on 8 June 1405. This conspiracy is the main historical context for Shakespeare's Henry IV, Part 2, and the execution is described with the words "Some guard these traitors to the block of death, / Treason's true bed and yielder up of breath."

Upon his death, Thomas de Mowbray was succeeded by his younger brother, John de Mowbray, 2nd Duke of Norfolk.

He was buried in the Church of the Greyfriars in York. His head was displayed for two months on a pike at Bootham Bar before it was taken down and reunited with the body. Legend had it that the head retained the freshness of life.

Political offices
Preceded by The Duke of Surrey	Earl Marshal; 1399–1405	Succeeded by The Earl of Westmorland
Peerage of England
Preceded by Thomas Mowbray I	Earl of Norfolk; Earl of Nottingham; 1399–1405	Succeeded by John Mowbray V
