= Elmley Castle (castle) =

11th-century fortification in Worcestershire, England

- Elmley Castle, Worcestershire
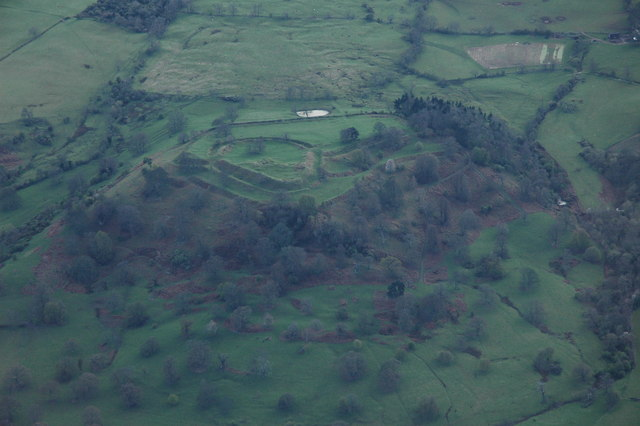
- Remains of Elmley Castle

Site information
- Type: Motte and bailey
- Open to the public: No
- Condition: Earthworks only survive

Location
- Shown within Worcestershire.
- Coordinates: 52.06107°N 2.03204°W
- Grid reference: grid reference SO979403

Site history
- Materials: Timber

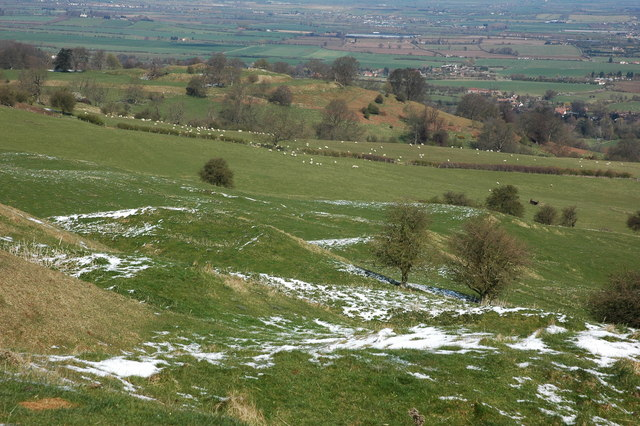
Earthworks of Elmley Castle

Arms of Beauchamp of Elmley, later Earls of Warwick: Gules, a fesse between six cross crosslets or

Elmley Castle was a late 11th-century earthwork and timber castle which received stone additions in the 12th and possibly 13th centuries, located 0.5 miles (0.8 km) south of the village of Elmley Castle and 12 miles (19 km) southeast of the city of Worcester, in Worcestershire. Nothing but the earthworks survive.

== History ==
The ruins of this important Norman and medieval castle, built within the former manor of Elmley, are located on the flanks of Bredon Hill, 1/2 mile to the south of the village to which it gives its name. The site is likely to have been an Iron Age camp, close to two other Iron Age sites on Bredon Hill, Kemerton Camp and Conderton Camp. The castle is believed to have been built by Robert le Despenser d'Abetot, Steward to King William II. Robert died childless in about 1098, when his sole heir was his brother Urse d'Abetot (c. 1040 –1108), first feudal baron of Salwarpe in Worcestershire, Sheriff of Worcestershire in about 1069, whose daughter Emmeline married Walter de Beauchamp. It remained the seat of the Beauchamp family until 1268 when William de Beauchamp, 9th Earl of Warwick inherited the Earldom of Warwick together with Warwick Castle from his maternal uncle William Maudit, 8th Earl of Warwick.

Thereafter, Elmley Castle remained a secondary possession of the Earls of Warwick until it was surrendered to the Crown in 1487. In 1528 the Castle seems to have been still habitable, as Walter Walshe was then appointed constable and keeper. In 1544, prior to its grant by the Crown to Sir William Herbert and Christopher Savage, a survey was made of the manor and castle of Elmley which found that the castle was completely uncovered and in decay. John Leland wrote at about this time:

"Ther stondithe now but one tower, and that partly broken. As I went by I saw carts carienge stone thens to amend Persore (Pershore) Bridge about ii miles of. It is set on the tope of a hill full of wood, and a townelet hard by."

Only earthworks now survive, which are designated as a Scheduled Monument. The outline of the former medieval deer park surrounding the castle survives.

== See also ==
- Castles in Great Britain and Ireland
- List of castles in England
