= Margaret de Clare, Baroness Badlesmere =

Anglo-Norman noblewoman

Margaret de Clare
- Baroness Badlesmere
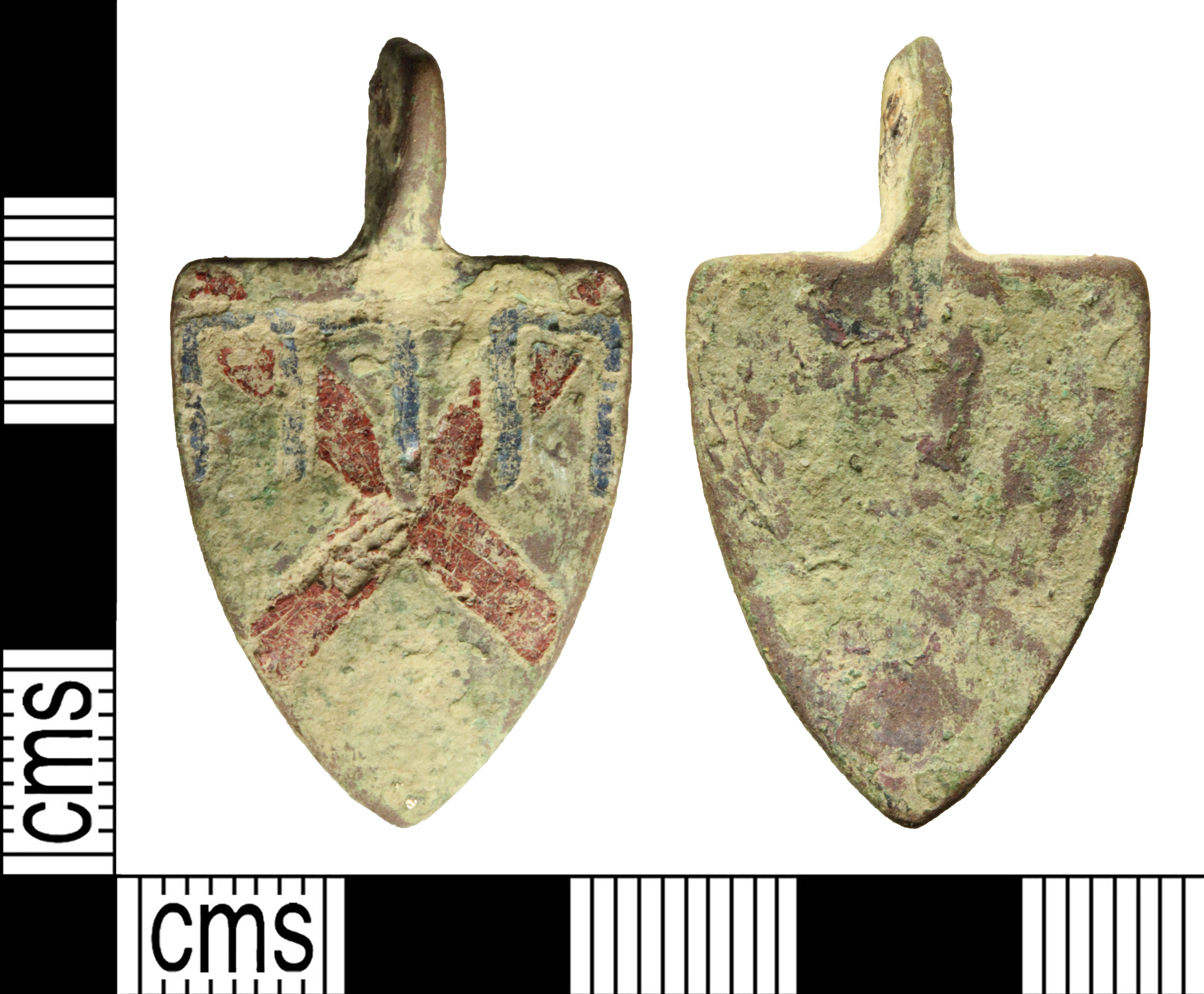
- Harness pendant of the 13th century, believed to bear Margaret's arms: Argent a saltire gules over all a label azure.
- Born: c. April 1287; Ireland
- Died: 22 October 1333 or 3 January 1334 (disputed); Convent house of the Minorite Sisters, Aldgate, London
- Noble family: de Clare
- Spouses: Gilbert de Umfraville; Bartholomew de Badlesmere, 1st Baron Badlesmere
- Issue: Margery de Badlesmere; Maud de Badlesmere; Elizabeth de Badlesmere; Giles de Badlesmere, 2nd Baron Badlesmere; Margaret de Badlesmere
- Father: Thomas de Clare, Lord of Thomond
- Mother: Juliana FitzGerald of Offaly

Margaret de Badlesmere, Baroness Badlesmere (née de Clare; c. 1 April 1287 – 22 October 1333/January 1334, disputed) was an Anglo-Norman noblewoman, suo jure heiress, and the wife of Bartholomew de Badlesmere, 1st Baron Badlesmere.

She was jailed at the Tower of London for a year, from November 1321 to November 1322, on account of having refused admittance and then ordering arrows to be fired on Isabella of France, Queen consort of Edward II of England and her group. Before Margaret had instructed her archers to fire upon Isabella and her escort, she had refused the Queen admittance to Leeds Castle, Kent, where her husband, Baron Badlesmere, held the post of governor, but which was legally the property of Queen Isabella as part of the latter's dower. Margaret surrendered the castle on 31 October 1321, after it was besieged by the King's forces using ballistas. Edward's capture of Leeds Castle was the catalyst that led to the Despenser War in the Welsh Marches and the north of England. Margaret became the first recorded female prisoner in the Tower's history.

Upon her release from the Tower, Margaret entered a religious life at the convent house of the Minorite Sisters outside Aldgate. King Edward granted her a stipend to pay for her maintenance.

== Background ==
Margaret was born at Bunratty Castle in County Clare, Ireland, circa 1 April 1287, the youngest child of Thomas de Clare, Lord of Thomond and Juliana FitzGerald of Offaly, and was a granddaughter of Richard de Clare, Earl of Hertford and Gloucester. She had two brothers, Gilbert de Clare, Lord of Thomond, and Richard de Clare, 1st Lord Clare, Lord of Thomond, who was killed at the Battle of Dysert O'Dea in 1318; and an elder sister, Maud, whose first husband was Robert de Clifford, 1st Baron de Clifford. Margaret had an illegitimate half-brother, Richard.

Her parents resided in both Ireland and England throughout their marriage; it has not been established where Juliana was residing at the time of Margaret's birth, although the date is known.

Her father died on 29 August 1287, when Margaret was almost five months of age. His cause of death has not been ascertained by historians. Her mother married her second husband, Nicholas Avenel, sometime afterwards, but the exact date of this marriage is not known. Between 11 December 1291 and 16 February 1292, Margaret acquired another stepfather when her mother married her third husband, Adam de Cretynges.

== Inheritance ==
A series of inquisitions post mortem, held in response to writs issued on 10 April 1321, established that Margaret, the wife of Bartholomew de Badlesmere and Maud, wife of Sir Robert de Welle (sisters of Richard de Clare and both aged 30 years and above) were the next heirs of Richard's son Thomas. Thomas' estate included the stewardship of the Forest of Essex, the town and castle at Thomond and numerous other properties in Ireland.

== First marriage ==
She married firstly before the year 1303, Gilbert de Umfraville, son of Gilbert de Umfraville, Earl of Angus, and Elizabeth Comyn. Upon their marriage, the Earl of Angus granted Gilbert and Margaret the manors of Hambleton and Market Overton; however, when Gilbert died childless prior to 1307, the manors passed to Margaret.

== Second marriage ==
On an unrecorded date earlier than 30 June 1308, when the couple were jointly granted the manor of Bourne, Sussex, Margaret married Bartholomew de Badlesmere, an English soldier and court official who was afterwards created 1st Baron Badlesmere by writ of summons. He had held the post of Governor of Bristol Castle since 1307, and during his life accumulated many remunerative grants and offices. It is feasible that Margaret's marriage to Badlesmere had been arranged by her brother-in-law, Baron Clifford; Badlesmere having been one of Clifford's retainers during the Scottish Wars. Clifford was later killed at the Battle of Bannockburn, where Badlesmere also fought.

Margaret was styled as Baroness Badlesmere on 26 October 1309 (the date her husband was by writ summoned to Parliament by the title of Baron Badlesmere) and henceforth known by that title.

When Margaret was staying at Cheshunt Manor in Hertfordshire in 1319, she was taken hostage by a group of sixty people, both men and women, who took her and the servants hostage. Her captors demanded a ransom of £100 for her release. She was held prisoner for one night before being rescued the following day by the King's favourite, Hugh Despenser the Younger. Hugh was married to Margaret's first cousin, Eleanor de Clare, eldest daughter of Gilbert de Clare, 7th Earl of Gloucester and Joan of Acre, hence Edward II's niece. The King ordered the arrest and imprisonment of twenty of Margaret's kidnappers; they all, however, were eventually pardoned.

== Issue ==
The five children of Margaret and Baron Badlesmere were:

- Margery de Badlesmere (1308/1309 – 18 October 1363), married before 25 November 1316 William de Ros, 2nd Baron de Ros of Helmsley, by whom she had six children.
- Maud de Badlesmere (1310 – 24 May 1366), married firstly, Robert FitzPayn; secondly, John de Vere, 7th Earl of Oxford, by whom she had seven children.
- Elizabeth de Badlesmere (1313 – 8 June 1356), married firstly in 1316, when she was aged three, Sir Edmund Mortimer, eldest son of Roger Mortimer, 1st Earl of March and Joan de Geneville, 2nd Baroness Geneville, but she did not start living with him until in her teens; following Mortimer's death she married secondly in 1335, William de Bohun, 1st Earl of Northampton. She had children by both marriages.
- Giles de Badlesmere, 2nd Baron Badlesmere (18 October 1314 – 7 June 1338), married Elizabeth Montagu, but did not have any children by her.
- Margaret de Badlesmere (born 1315), married Sir John Tiptoft, 2nd Lord Tiptoft, by whom she had one son, Robert Tiptoft.

== The siege of Leeds Castle ==
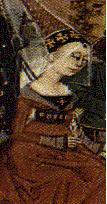
Queen consort Isabella, whom Margaret offended by refusing her admittance to Leeds Castle

Margaret's husband, Baron Badlesmere was appointed Governor of the Royal Castle of Leeds in Kent in the fifth year of Edward II's reign (1312). In October 1321, nine years after he assumed office, queen consort Isabella went on a pilgrimage to the shrine of Thomas Becket at Canterbury. She decided to interrupt her journey by stopping at Leeds Castle which legally belonged to her, as the fortress and its demesne were part of her dower to be retained in widowhood. Badlesmere, who by then had become disaffected with King Edward and had joined the swelling ranks of his opponents, was away at a meeting of the Contrariants near Oxford at the time and had left Margaret in charge of the castle.

Shortly before, Baron Badlesmere had deposited all of his treasure and goods inside Leeds Castle for safekeeping.

Due to her strong dislike of Isabella as well as her own feisty character, (Note: Margaret's paternal grandmother, Maud de Lacy, was known as the most litigious woman in the 13th century. [Reference: Linda Elizabeth Mitchell. Portraits of Medieval Women: Family, Marriage and Politics in England 1225–1350]) Margaret refused the Queen admittance. It was suggested by Francis Lancellott that Margaret's antipathy towards Queen Isabella had its origins in about 1317 when she had asked Isabella to use her influence on behalf of a friend who was seeking an appointment in the Exchequer Office. When Isabella refused her request, for reasons unknown, henceforth Margaret became the Queen's enemy. Margaret allegedly told Isabella's marshal, whom she met on the lowered drawbridge, that "the Queen must seek some other lodging, for I would not admit anyone within the castle without an order from my lord [Baron Badlesmere]". After issuing her message, the Queen, having ignored Margaret's directive, approached the outer barbican in an attempt to enter the castle by force. Margaret subsequently ordered her archers to loose their arrows upon Isabella's group from the battlements.

The unexpected, lethal volley of arrows, which killed six of the royal escort, compelled Isabella to make a hasty retreat from the castle and to seek alternative accommodation for the night. Historian Paul C. Doherty suggests that the pilgrimage was a ruse on the part of the King and Queen to create a casus belli. Edward would have known beforehand that Baron Badlesmere was with the Contrariants and had left Leeds Castle in the hands of the hostile Baroness Badlesmere; therefore he had given instructions for Isabella to stop at Leeds, aware she would likely be refused admittance. Using the insult against the Queen as a banner, he would then be able to gather the moderate nobles and outraged populace to his side as a means of crushing the Contrariants.

When Edward heard of the brutal reception his consort was given by Margaret, he was outraged and personally mustered a sizeable force of men "aged between sixteen and sixty", including at least six earls, to join him in a military expedition which he promptly led against Margaret and her garrison at Leeds Castle to avenge the grievous insult delivered to the Queen by one of his subjects. Following a relentless assault of the fortress, which persisted for more than five days (Note: According to Edward II's biographer, Roy Martin Haines, the siege lasted 15 days. [Reference: Haines, p.132]) and with the King's troops using ballistas, Margaret surrendered at curfew on 31 October having received a "promise of mercy" from Edward.

Throughout the siege, Margaret had expected the Earl of Lancaster to arrive with his soldiery to relieve her, but he refused as he was related to Isabella; (Note: Thomas, 2nd Earl of Lancaster was the uterine half-uncle of Queen Isabella, being the son of her maternal grandmother Blanche of Artois by the latter's second marriage to Edmund Crouchback, 1st Earl of Lancaster.) nor had any of the other Contrariants or the Marcher Lords (Note: Margaret's daughter, Elizabeth was married to Edmund Mortimer, eldest son of the powerful Marcher Lord Roger Mortimer, the future 1st Earl of March) come to her assistance, which left her to defend the castle with merely her husband's nephew, Bartholomew de Burghersh, and the garrison troops. Baron Badlesmere, although supportive of Margaret's conduct, had only managed to despatch some knights from Witney to augment the garrison troops in the defence of Leeds.

Once King Edward had gained possession of the castle and the Badlesmere treasure within, the seneschal, Walter Colepepper and twelve of the garrison were hanged from the battlements. (Note: The Calendar of Fine Rolls names the 13 executed men as Walter Colpepper, Richard Prat, Roger de Coumbe, Richard de Chidecroft, Thomas de Chidecroft, Richard Brisynge, William Colyn, Roger de Rokayle, Simon de Tyerst, Robert de Bromere, Nicholas de Bradefeld, Robert de Cheigny, and Adam le Wayte. [Reference:Calendar of Fine Rolls 1319–1327. p.76]) Margaret was arrested and sent as a prisoner, along with her five children and Bartholomew de Burghersh, to the Tower of London; she thus became the first recorded woman imprisoned in the Tower.

On her journey to the fortress, her progress was watched by the hostile citizens of London who were loyal to Isabella.

=== Aftermath ===
The King's military victory at Leeds, accomplished with the help of six influential earls including the Earls of Pembroke and Richmond, encouraged him to reclaim and assert the prerogative powers that Lancaster and the Lords Ordainers had so long denied him. (Note: The Ordinances were repealed at the parliament held in York in May 1322.) The dominant baronial oligarchy broke up into factions. Many of the nobles who had previously been hostile to Edward rushed to his side to quell the insurrection of the Marcher Lords, known as the Despenser War, which had erupted in full force after the King defiantly recalled to England the two Despensers (father and son,) whom the Ordainers had compelled him to banish in August 1321. The first sparks to the uprising had been ignited when, prior to his expulsion, the rapacious Hugh le Despenser the Younger had persuaded the infatuated King to grant him lands in the Welsh Marches which rightfully belonged to entrenched Marcher barons such as Roger Mortimer, his uncle Roger Mortimer de Chirk, and Humphrey de Bohun, 4th Earl of Hereford, a staunch Ordainer albeit the King's brother-in-law. (Note: In 1302, Humphrey de Bohun married Edward II's youngest sister, Elizabeth of Rhuddlan; she died in 1316.) They had formed a confederation and made devastating raids against Despenser holdings in Wales; and Mortimer led his men in an unsuccessful march on London. These mutinous events, in addition to other incidents which created a tense situation and called for a mobilisation of forces throughout the realm, eventually led to the Ordainers constraining the King to exile the favourites. However, subsequent to his capture of Leeds Castle and the harsh sentences he had meted out to the insubordinate Margaret de Clare and her garrison, King Edward defied the Contrariants by persuading the bishops to declare the Despensers' banishment illegal at a convocation of the clergy, and he summoned them home. This act had dire consequences in addition to the Despenser War: it paved the way for the complete domination of the grasping Despensers over Edward and his kingdom, leading to Roger Mortimer and Queen Isabella's 1326 Invasion of England, their assumption of power, the execution of the two Despensers, and finally, Edward's deposition.

== Imprisonment ==
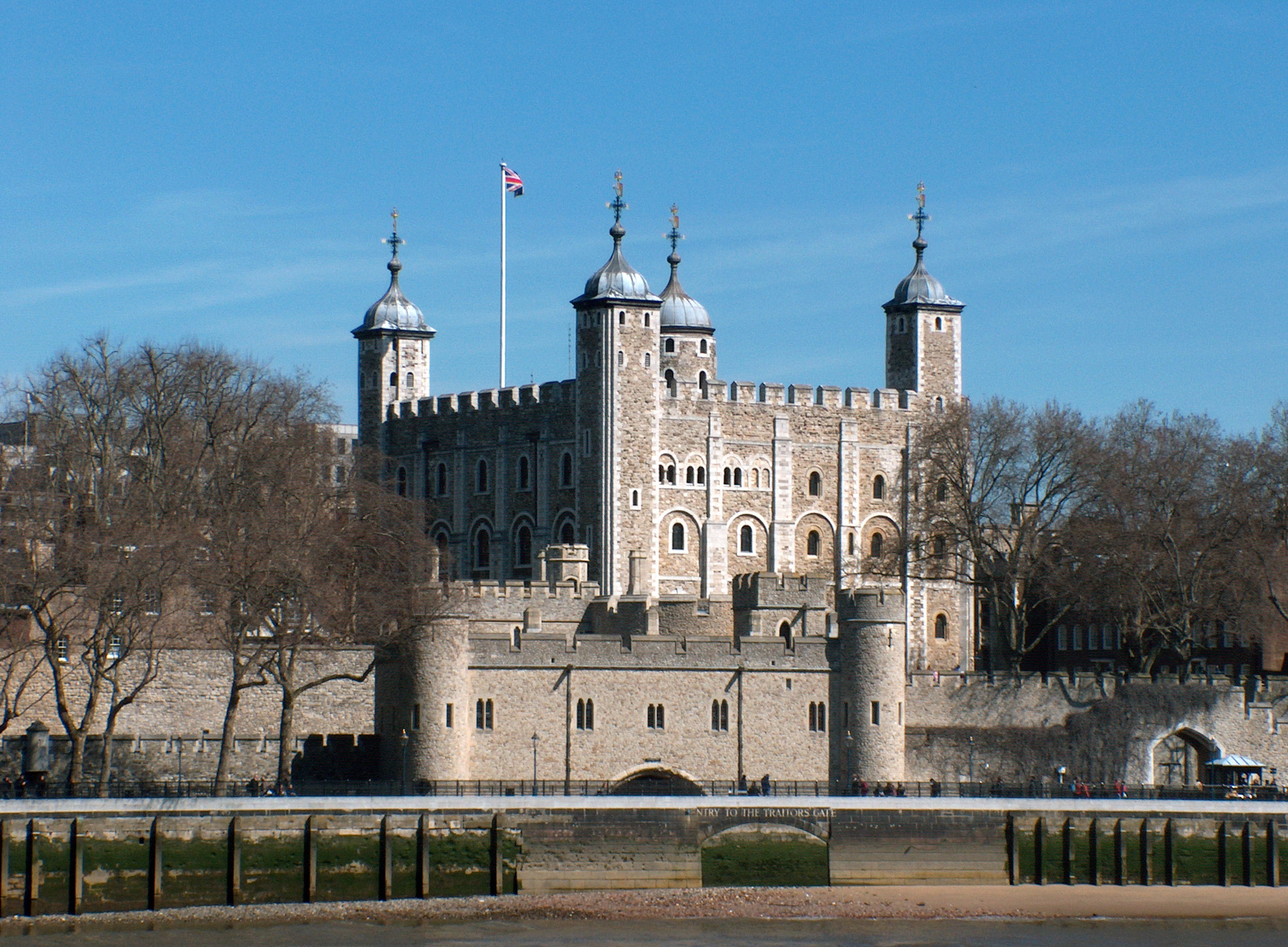
Margaret was the first recorded woman imprisoned in the Tower of London.

Baron Badlesmere excused his wife's bellicose actions at Leeds with his declaration that when he had left Margaret in charge of Leeds, he had given her strict instructions not to admit anyone inside the castle without his specific orders. This, he had insisted, included the Queen, with the words that "the royal prerogative of the King in the case of refusal of entry should not be assumed to provide a legal right for the Queen, who was merely his wife". As a result of Margaret's imprisonment, Badlesmere remained firmly aligned with the King's opponents; shortly afterwards he participated in the Earl of Lancaster's rebellion. Badlesmere was captured after taking part in the Battle of Boroughbridge on 16 March 1322 which had ended with a royalist victory. Following trial at Canterbury, he was executed at Blean on 14 April 1322.

Margaret remained imprisoned in the Tower until 3 November 1322, when she was released on the strength of a bond from her son-in-law William de Ros and five others. Presumably her children were released with her, but a record of the exact dates of their liberation has not been found.

== Later life ==
Margaret retired to the convent house of the Minorite Sisters, outside Aldgate, where the abbess Alice de Sherstede was personally acquainted with Queen Isabella, who took an interest in the convent's business affairs. On 13 February 1323, the King granted Margaret a stipend of two shillings a day for her maintenance, which was paid to her by the Sheriff of Essex. She also received a considerable proportion of her late husband's manors for her dower.

Edward demonstrated his goodwill toward Margaret again on 1 July 1324, by giving her "permission to go to her friends within the realm whither she will, provided that she be always ready to come to the king when summoned". It appears that after then she lived at Hambleton, Rutland as it was from there that on 27 May 1325 she submitted a petition in connection with property at Chilham.

Her son Giles obtained a reversal of his father's attainder in 1328, and succeeded by writ to the barony as the 2nd Baron Badlesmere. By this time, Edward II had been deposed in favour of his son Edward III in January 1327.

Margaret died between 22 October 1333 and 3 January 1334.

== Seal ==
In 1328, Margaret's seal displayed three shields, consisting of those of each of her parents and a shield impaling the arms of her two dead husbands.

== Ancestry ==
Ancestors of Margaret de Clare, Baroness Badlesmere

Richard de Clare, 4th Earl of Hertford
Gilbert de Clare, 5th Earl of Hertford
Amice FitzRobert, Countess of Gloucester
Richard de Clare, 6th Earl of Hertford, 2nd Earl of Gloucester
William Marshal, 1st Earl of Pembroke
Isabel Marshal
Isabel de Clare, 4th Countess of Pembroke
Thomas de Clare, Lord of Thomond
Roger de Lacy
John de Lacy, 1st Earl of Lincoln
Maud de Clare
Maud de Lacy, Countess of Gloucester
Robert de Quincy
Margaret de Quincy, suo jure Countess of Lincoln
Hawise of Chester, Countess of Lincoln
Margaret de Clare
Gerald FitzMaurice, 1st Lord of Offaly
Maurice FitzGerald, 2nd Lord of Offaly
Eve de Bermingham
Maurice FitzGerald, 3rd Lord of Offaly
Juliana
Juliana FitzGerald
Philip de Prendergast
Gerald de Prendergast
Maud de Quincy
Maud de Prendergast
Richard Mor de Burgh
Matilda de Burgh
Egidia de Lacy

== Bibliography ==
1. Cokayne, G. E. The Complete Peerage of England, Scotland, Ireland, Great Britain and the United Kingdom, Extant, Extinct, or Dormant. ISBN 978-0342059508
2. Costain, Thomas B. (1958). The Three Edwards. Garden City, New York: Doubleday and Company, Inc. ISBN 978-1568493701
3. Haines, Roy Martin (2003). King Edward II: Edward of Caernarfon, his life, his reign and its aftermath, 1284–1330. Montreal: McGill-Queens University Press. ISBN 978-0773524323
4. Richardson, Douglas, Everingham, Kimball G. (2004). Magna Carta Ancestry: A Study in Colonial and Medieval Families. Baltimore: Genealogical Publishing Company, Inc. ISBN 978-1461045205
