= Elizabeth de Bohun, Countess of Northampton =

English noblewoman (1313–1356)

Elizabeth de Bohun
- Countess of Northampton
- Born: 1313; Castle Badlesmere, Kent, England
- Died: 8 June 1356 (aged 43); Blackfriars, London
- Noble family: Badlesmere (by birth); Mortimer (by marriage); Bohun (by marriage)
- Spouses: Sir Edmund Mortimer (m. 1316; died 1331) William de Bohun, 1st Earl of Northampton (m. 1335)
- Issue: Roger Mortimer, 2nd Earl of March; John Mortimer; Humphrey de Bohun, 7th Earl of Hereford; Elizabeth de Bohun
- Father: Bartholomew de Badlesmere, 1st Baron Badlesmere
- Mother: Margaret de Clare

Elizabeth de Bohun (née de Badlesmere), Countess of Northampton (1313 – 8 June 1356) was the wife of two English noblemen, Sir Edmund Mortimer and William de Bohun, 1st Earl of Northampton. She was a co-heiress of her brother Giles de Badlesmere, 2nd Baron Badlesmere.

At the age of eight she was sent to the Tower of London along with her mother, Margaret de Clare, Baroness Badlesmere and her four siblings after the former refused entry to Queen consort Isabella to Leeds Castle by ordering archers to open fire against her group.

== Family ==
Elizabeth was born at Castle Badlesmere, Kent, England in 1313 to Bartholomew de Badlesmere, 1st Baron Badlesmere and Margaret de Clare. Her paternal grandparents were Guncelin de Badlesmere and Joan FitzBernard, and her maternal grandparents were Thomas de Clare, Lord of Thomond and Juliana FitzGerald of Offaly.

Elizabeth's father was hanged, drawn and quartered on 14 April 1322 for having participated in the Earl of Lancaster's rebellion against King Edward II of England; and her mother imprisoned in the Tower of London until 3 November 1322. She had been arrested the previous October for ordering an attack upon Queen consort Isabella after refusing her admittance to Leeds Castle, where Baron Badlesmere held the post of governor. Elizabeth and her siblings were also sent to the Tower along with their mother. Elizabeth was eight years old at the time and had been married for five years to her first husband; although the marriage had not yet been consummated due to her young age.

In 1328, Elizabeth's brother Giles obtained a reversal of his father's attainder, and he succeeded to the barony as the 2nd Baron Badlesmere. Elizabeth, along with her three sisters, was a co-heiress of Giles, who had no children. Upon his death in 1338, the barony fell into abeyance. The Badlesmere estates were divided among the four sisters, and Elizabeth's share included the manors of Drayton in Sussex, Kingston and Erith in Kent, a portion of Finmere in Oxfordshire as well as property in London.

== Marriages and issue ==
On 27 June 1316, when she was just three years old, Elizabeth was married to her first husband Sir Edmund Mortimer. The marriage contract was made on 9 May 1316. Lord Badlesmere paid Roger Mortimer the sum of £2000, and in return Mortimer endowed Elizabeth with five rich manors for life and the reversion of other lands.

Elizabeth and Edmund had:

- Roger Mortimer, 2nd Earl of March (11 November 1328 Ludlow Castle- 26 February 1360), married Philippa Montagu, daughter of William Montagu, 1st Earl of Salisbury and Catherine Grandison, by whom he had issue, including Edmund Mortimer, 3rd Earl of March).
- John Mortimer (died young)

Elizabeth's father-in-law, the Earl of Mortimer was hanged in November 1330 for having assumed royal power, along with other crimes. His estates were forfeited to the Crown, therefore Elizabeth's husband did not succeed to the earldom and died a year later. Elizabeth's dower included the estates of Maelienydd and Comot Deuddwr in the Welsh Marches.

In 1335, Elizabeth married secondly William de Bohun, 1st Earl of Northampton (1312–1360), fifth son of Humphrey de Bohun, 4th Earl of Hereford and Elizabeth of Rhuddlan. Their marriage was arranged to end the mutual hostility which had existed between the Bohun and Mortimer families.

Elizabeth and William had:

- Humphrey de Bohun, 7th Earl of Hereford 6th Earl of Essex, 2nd Earl of Northampton (24 March 1342 – 16 January 1373), after 9 September 1359, married Joan Fitzalan, Countess of Hereford, by whom he had two daughters, Eleanor de Bohun, Duchess of Gloucester, and Mary de Bohun, wife of Henry of Bolingbroke (who later reigned as King Henry IV).
- Elizabeth de Bohun (c.1350- 3 April 1385), on 28 September 1359, married Richard Fitzalan, 11th Earl of Arundel, by whom she had seven children including Thomas Fitzalan, 12th Earl of Arundel, Elizabeth FitzAlan, and Joan FitzAlan, Baroness Bergavenny.

== Death ==
Elizabeth de Badlesmere died on 8 June 1356. She was buried in Black Friars Priory, London. Her will, dated 31 May 1356, requested burial at the priory.
