= Bartholomew Badlesmere, 1st Baron Badlesmere =

Member of the Parliament of England

- 1st Baron Badlesmere
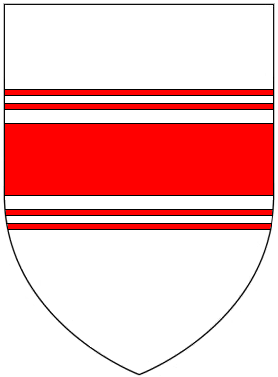
- Arms of Badlesmere: Argent, a fess between two bars gemeles gules. As blazoned for Sir Gunselm de Badlesmere, on the Herald's Roll of Arms also on The Camden Roll & St George's Roll
- Tenure: 1309-1322
- Successor: Giles Badlesmere
- Born: 1275
- Died: 14 April 1322 (aged 46–47); Blean near Canterbury
- Residence: Leeds Castle, Chilham Castle
- Offices: Lord Warden of the Cinque Ports
- Spouse: Margaret Clare
- Issue: Margery Badlesmere; Maud Badlesmere; Elizabeth Badlesmere; Giles Badlesmere; Margaret Badlesmere
- Father: Gunselm Badlesmere
- Mother: Joan FitzBernard

Bartholomew de Badlesmere, 1st Baron Badlesmere (18 August 1275 – 14 April 1322) was an English soldier, diplomat, member of parliament, landowner and nobleman. He was the son and heir of Sir Gunselm de Badlesmere (died ca. 1301) and Joan FitzBernard. He fought in the English army both in France and Scotland during the later years of the reign of Edward I of England and the earlier part of the reign of Edward II of England. He was executed after participating in an unsuccessful rebellion led by Thomas, 2nd Earl of Lancaster.

== Career ==
The earliest records of Bartholomew's life relate to his service in royal armies, which included campaigns in Gascony (1294), Flanders (about 1297) and Scotland (1298, 1300, 1301–04, 1306–08, 1310–11, 1314–19). However, even at a relatively young age his activities were not limited to soldiering.

In October 1300, he was one of the household of Henry de Lacy, Earl of Lincoln who were permitted by the King to accompany the Earl when he set out for Rome during the following month in order to complain to Pope Boniface VIII of injury done by the Scots.

A writ issued on 13 April 1301, presumably soon after the death of Jocelin, Sir Gunselm de Badlesmere, initiated inquests into the identity of the next heir of lands that he held direct from the King. This led to a hearing on 30 April of that year in relation to property in Kent at Badlesmere and Donewelleshethe, where it was confirmed that the heir was his son Bartholomew, then aged 26.

Bartholomew de Badlesmere and Fulk Payfrer were the knights who represented the county of Kent at the Parliament that sat at Carlisle from January 1306/7 until 27 March 1307. Also in 1307 Bartholomew was appointed governor of Bristol Castle. In that role he took charge of the subjugation of the city when it defied royal authority in 1316.

In 1310, Bartholomew acted as deputy Constable of England on behalf of the Earl of Hereford. Bartholomew served as his lieutenant when Hereford refused to perform his duties in the Scottish campaign of 1310–11. He was one of the retinue of the Earl of Gloucester at the Battle of Bannockburn on 24 June 1314, Bartholomew's own sub-retinue consisting of at least 50 men. He was criticised for not coming to his aid when Gloucester lost his life in an impetuous attack on the Scottish schiltron on that occasion.

In the following January, Bartholomew was one of the many notables who attended the funeral of Piers Gaveston.

On 28 April 1316, Bartholomew was one of four men who were authorised to grant safe conducts in the King's name to Robert Bruce and other Scots so that they could come to England to negotiate a truce. In December of that year, he was commissioned, along with the Bishop of Ely and the Bishop of Norwich to go on an embassy to Pope John XXII at Avignon to seek his help against the Scots and request a Bull to release the King from his oath to the Ordinances. In June of the same year, Bartholomew's daughter Elizabeth married Edward, the son and heir of Roger Mortimer. Bartholomew was sufficiently wealthy to pay £2,000 for the marriage, in exchange for which extensive property was settled on the bride.

On 1 November 1317, the King appointed Bartholomew as custodian of Leeds Castle in Kent This was followed by a transaction on 20 March 1318 by which the King granted the castle and manor of Leeds along with the advowson of the priory of Leeds to Bartholomew and his heirs in exchange for the manor and advowson of Adderley, Shropshire, which Bartholomew surrendered to the King

By late November 1317, Bartholomew made a compact with a number of noblemen and prelates, including Aymer de Valence, 2nd Earl of Pembroke, Humphrey de Bohun, 4th Earl of Hereford and the Archbishop of Canterbury with the aim of reducing the influence on the King of advisors of whom they disapproved. Bartholomew and his associates formed a loose grouping which has been referred to by modern historians as the "Middle Party", who detested alike Edward's minions, such as the Hugh le Despenser, 1st Earl of Winchester, and his violent enemies such as Lancaster. Although he was hostile to Thomas, 2nd Earl of Lancaster, Bartholomew helped to make peace between the king and Lancaster in 1318.

On 1 October 1318, Bartholomew was with the King at York, setting out to repel an invasion by the Scots. Nineteen days later, he was appointed as the King's household steward in place of William Montagu. This position was of major importance, as it provided continual access to the King's presence and considerable influence over who could obtain access to the king. Bartholomew was still holding this appointment in June 1321. Financial grants that he received during this period included £500 on appointment as steward and over £1,300 in October 1319.

In 1319, Bartholomew obtained the king's licence to found a priory on his manor of Badlesmere, but the proposed priory was never established. In June of the following year, he hosted a splendid reception at Chilham Castle for Edward II and his entourage when they were travelling to Dover en route for France. Also in 1320, he was granted control of Dover Castle and Wardenship of the Cinque Ports and in 1321 was appointed governor of Tunbridge Castle.

During the earlier part of 1321, Bartholomew, along with the Bishop of Worcester and the Bishop of Carlisle and others represented the King in unsuccessful negotiations with the Scots for either a permanent peace or an extended truce.

== Rebellion ==
By the summer of 1321, Bartholomew defied the King by associating with their mutual enemy the Earl of Lancaster and his allies in their active opposition to Edward's "evil councillors" such as the Despensers. The Lancastrian forces moved from the North to London, reaching the capital by the end of July.

In the autumn, the King started to apply pressure targeted on Bartholomew, probably partly because many of his manors were closer to London than those of magnates such as Lancaster and partly because of anger at the disloyalty of his own household steward. Edward took control of Dover Castle and forbade Bartholomew entrance to the county of Kent, an injunction that he promptly breached. Bartholomew then returned to Witney, Oxfordshire, where a tournament attended by many of his new allies was being held. When returning to London from a pilgrimage to Canterbury, the Queen did not take the most direct route but detoured to Leeds Castle, where she and her armed retinue demanded access, precipitating the siege and its aftermath that is described in detail in the article about Bartholomew's wife Margaret de Clare, Baroness Badlesmere.

Although Bartholomew assembled an armed force and marched from Witney towards Kent, by the time he reached Kingston upon Thames it was clear that he would not receive help from Lancaster and his followers and so he was not able to take effective action to relieve the siege. During the following months, civil war broke out.

On 26 December 1321, the King ordered the Sheriff of Gloucester to arrest Bartholomew. Shortly afterwards, the King offered safe conducts to the rebels who would come over to him, with the specific exception of Bartholomew de Badlesmere.

Details contained in arrest warrants signpost the progress of Bartholomew and his companions across England. By 15 January 1321/2, they had occupied and burned the town of Bridgnorth and sacked the castles at Elmley and Hanley. By 23 February, the rebels had been sighted in Northamptonshire. On 1 March, Bartholomew was reported as one of a number of prominent rebels who had reached Pontefract.

On 11 March the sheriff of Nottingham and Derby was ordered to arrest the same group, who had taken Burton upon Trent but they departed from that town when the royal army approached. On 16 March 1321/22, the Earl of Lancaster and his allies were defeated at the Battle of Boroughbridge.

== Death ==
Bartholomew fled south from Boroughbridge and, according to the "Livere de Reis", was captured in a small wood near Brickden and taken by the Earl of Mar to Canterbury. Alternative details appear in John Leland's "Collectanea", which states that "Syr Barptolemew Badelesmere was taken at Stow Parke yn the Manoyr of the Bishop of Lincoln that was his nephew." Stow Park is about 10 miles north-west of the centre of Lincoln, where the bishop was Henry Burghersh. Stow Park was one of the principal residences of the Bishop in that era but none of the medieval buildings still survive above ground. The identity of "Brickden" is uncertain but may well refer to Buckden, Huntingdonshire, another place where the Bishop of Lincoln had a manor house (Buckden Towers). If so, that may be the reason for the differing accounts of the place that Bartholomew had reached when he was arrested, as they both featured residences of his nephew.

Bartholomew was tried at Canterbury on 14 April 1322 and sentenced to death. On the same day he was drawn for three miles behind a horse to Blean, where he held property. There he was hanged and beheaded. His head was displayed on the Burgh Gate at Canterbury and the rest of his body left hanging at Blean. There it probably remained for quite some time, as it was not until the Lent Parliament of 1324 that the prelates successfully petitioned for the bodies of the nobles still hanging on the gallows to be given ecclesiastical burial. In a book that was first published in 1631, the antiquary John Weever stated that Bartholomew was buried at White Friars, Canterbury; this was a community of the Order of St Augustine.

== Property ==
By the latter part of his life, Bartholomew possessed a vast portfolio of properties, either in his own right or jointly with his wife Margaret. These assets were forfeited because of Bartholomew's rebellion. During the first four years of reign of Edward III, a series of inquisitions post mortem established the properties to which Margaret was entitled and also those of which her son Giles would be the right heir. Much of the property was restored to Bartholomew's widow or assigned to Giles, who at that juncture was still a minor in the King's wardship.

Some of the properties that Bartholomew held are listed below; the list is not exhaustive and he did not necessarily hold all of them at the same time.

- Bedfordshire: The manor of Sondyington (i.e. Sundon).
- Buckinghamshire: The manor of Hambleden. Also the manors of Cowley and Preston, both of which were in the parish of Preston Bissett.
- Essex: The manors of Chingford, Latchley (i.e. Dagworth Manor at Pebmarsh), Little Stambridge and Thaxted.
- Gloucestershire: The manor of Oxenton.
- Herefordshire: The manor of Lenhales and Lenhales Castle at Lyonshall.
- Hertfordshire: The manors of Buckland, Mardleybury (at Welwyn) and Plashes (at Standon).
- Kent: The manors of Badlesmere, Bockingfold (north of Goudhurst), Chilham, Hothfield, Kingsdown, Lesnes, Rydelyngwelde (i.e. Ringwould), Tonge and Whitstable. Bartholomew's possessions in this county included Chilham Castle and Leeds Castle.
- Oxfordshire: The manor of Finmere.
- Shropshire: The manors of Adderley and Ideshale (at Shifnal).
- Suffolk: The manors of Barrow and Brendebradefeld (i.e. Bradfield Combust).
- Sussex: The manors of Eastbourne and Laughton, and reversions of the manors of Drayton, Etchingham and West Dean.
- Wiltshire: The manors of Castle Combe, Knook, Orcheston and West Heytesbury.

The relevant inquisitions post mortem also contain details of numerous advowsons and other property rights that Bartholomew owned.

== Family ==
Bartholomew married Margaret de Clare, childless widow of Gilbert Umfraville, son of Gilbert Umfraville, 2nd Earl of Angus. The marriage had taken place by 30 June 1308, when the couple were jointly granted the manor of Bourne, Sussex. Margaret was a daughter of Thomas de Clare and his wife Juliana FitzGerald. A comprehensive overview of their children can be seen in the records of numerous inquisitions post mortem that were held after the death of their son Giles on 7 June 1338. The evidence given at each hearing rested on local knowledge and there were some inconsistencies about the names of Giles' sisters and their precise ages. However, taken as a whole, it is clear from the inquisition records that the names of Bartholomew's children were as follows, listed in descending order of age:

- Margery de Badlesmere, married William de Ros, 2nd Baron de Ros of Helmsley (Hamlake)
- Maud de Badlesmere, married Robert FitzPayn, then John de Vere, 7th Earl of Oxford
- Elizabeth de Badlesmere, married Sir Edmund Mortimer, then William de Bohun, 1st Earl of Northampton
- Giles de Badlesmere, 2nd Baron Badlesmere, married Elizabeth Montagu, and died without issue
- Margaret de Badlesmere, married John Tiptoft, 2nd Baron Tibetot. Her tomb was at the Ipswich Greyfriars.

Bartholomew Badlesmere, 1st Baron Badlesmere Born: 1275 Died: 14 April 1322
Peerage of England
Preceded by New Creation	Baron Badlesmere; 1309–1322	Succeeded by Giles de Badlesmere
Political offices
Preceded by The Lord Cobham	Lord Warden of the Cinque Ports; 1320	Succeeded by The Lord le Despencer
