= John Tiptoft, 2nd Baron Tibetot =

English nobleman

Arms of Tibetot (or Tiptoft): Argent, a saltire engrailed gules

John Tiptoft (or Tibetot), 2nd Baron Tibetot (20 July 1313 – 13 April 1367), English nobleman, was the son of Pain Tiptoft, 1st Baron Tibetot and Agnes de Ros.

He brought his retinue to fight in Edward III's Flanders campaign of 1338–1340. He was appointed Keeper of Berwick-upon-Tweed on 16 April 1346 and Chancellor of Berwick on 21 May 1346.

He married Margaret de Badlesmere, daughter of Bartholomew de Badlesmere, 1st Lord Badlesmere, and had two children:

- Robert Tiptoft, 3rd Baron Tibetot (1341–1372)
- John Tiptoft, died without issue

He married a second time to Elizabeth Aspall, daughter of Sir Robert Aspall, and had one child:

- Sir Payn Tiptoft (d. c. 1413)

Peerage of England
| Preceded by Pain Tiptoft | Baron Tibetot; 1314–1367 | Succeeded by Robert Tiptoft |
