= Guncelin Badlesmere =

English knight and Justice of Chester

- Born: before 1243
- Died: 1301
- Noble family: Badlesmere
- Father: Bartholomew Badlesmere

Sir Guncelin Badlesmere (died 1301), also written as Gunselm, was an English judge and administrator from Kent.

== Origins ==
From a family of minor gentry in the village of Badlesmere, who had served as knights and judges, he was born before 1243 as the son of Batholomew Badlesmere.

== Career ==
Attached to the royal household as a knight banneret, in 1274 he replaced Reginald Grey as Justice of Chester on an annual salary of 67 pounds. To this responsibility was added in 1278 the custody of Flint Castle and Rhuddlan Castle, plus another 67 pounds a year. He remained justice of Chester until 1281, when Grey was reappointed. In 1285 and in 1297 he is recorded as serving overseas and in 1297 he was one of the witnesses to the ceremony in Tonbridge Castle at which John Langton was invested with the royal seal as Lord Chancellor.

He died shortly before 13 April 1301, and was reportedly buried in Badlesmere church, where a wooden cross-legged effigy was erected.

== Family ==
The name of his wife is in fact unknown, though older accounts used to name her as Margaret or Joan FitzBernard, and sources mention three children:

- Bartholomew Badlesmere, 1st Baron Badlesmere (died 1322), his heir, who married Margaret Clare.
- Maud Badlesmere (died before 1345), who married Robert Burghersh, 1st Baron Burghersh.
- Joan Badlesmere (died 1319), who married John Northwood, 1st Baron Northwood. She is commemorated by a brass in the church of Minster-in-Sheppey.
