= Baron Badlesmere =

Former barony in the Peerage of England

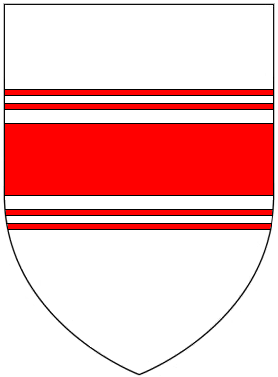
Arms of Badlesmere: Argent, a fess between two bars gemeles gules. As blazoned for Guncelin de Badlesmere, on the Herald's Roll of Arms also on The Camden Roll & St George's Roll

Baron Badlesmere was a title in the Peerage of England.

On 26 October 1309 Bartholomew Badlesmere, Governor of Bristol Castle, was summoned to Parliament, regarded as a barony by writ. In 1322, he was attainted and executed for joining the rebellion of the Earl of Lancaster, and the barony was forfeited. In 1328, the attainder was reversed for his only son, Giles Badlesmere, who became the second and last baron. On his death in 1338 without a son, the barony lapsed.

Theoretically, the title remains "abeyant" between the descendants of his four sisters.

== Barons Badlesmere (1309–1338) ==
- Bartholomew Badlesmere, 1st Baron (1275–1322) (forfeit 1322)
- Giles Badlesmere, 2nd Baron (1314–1338) (reversed 1328, abeyant 1338)
