= List of peers 1300–1309 =

This page lists all peers who held extant titles between 1300 and 1309.

== Peerage of England ==
Title	Holder	Date gained	Date lost	Notes
Earl of Surrey (1088)	John de Warenne, 6th Earl of Surrey	1240	1304	Died
Earl of Surrey (1088)	John de Warenne, 7th Earl of Surrey	1304	1347	
Earl of Warwick (1088)	Guy de Beauchamp, 10th Earl of Warwick	1298	1315	
Earl of Gloucester (1122)	Gilbert de Clare, 8th Earl of Gloucester	1295	1314	
Earl of Arundel (1138)	Richard FitzAlan, 8th Earl of Arundel	1272	1302	Died
Earl of Arundel (1138)	Edmund FitzAlan, 9th Earl of Arundel	1302	1326	
Earl of Norfolk (1140)	Roger Bigod, 5th Earl of Norfolk	1270	1306	Died, title extinct
Earl of Oxford (1142)	Robert de Vere, 6th Earl of Oxford	1297	1331	
Earl of Salisbury (1145)	Margaret Longespée, 4th Countess of Salisbury	1261	1310	
Earl of Hereford (1199)	Humphrey de Bohun, 4th Earl of Hereford	1298	1322	
Earl of Lincoln (1217)	Henry de Lacy, 3rd Earl of Lincoln	1266	1310	
Earl of Cornwall (1225)	Edmund, 2nd Earl of Cornwall	1272	1300	Died, title extinct
Earl of Pembroke (1247)	Aymer de Valence, 2nd Earl of Pembroke	1296	1324	
Earl of Leicester (1265)	Thomas Plantagenet, 2nd Earl of Leicester and Lancaster	1296	1322	
Earl of Richmond (1268)	John II, Duke of Brittany	1268	1305	Died, the Earldom reverted to the Crown
Earl of Chester (1301)	Edward of Caernarvon, Earl of Chester	1301	1307	New creation; succeeded to the Throne, and the title merged in the Crown
Earl of Richmond (1306)	John of Brittany, Earl of Richmond	1306	1334	New creation; also created Baron of Brittany in 1305
Earl of Cornwall (1307)	Piers Gaveston, 1st Earl of Cornwall	1307	1312	New creation
Baron de Ros (1264)	William de Ros, 1st Baron de Ros	1285	1316	
Baron le Despencer (1264)	Hugh le Despencer, 2nd Baron le Despencer	1265	1326	
Baron Basset of Drayton (1264)	Ralph Basset, 2nd Baron Basset of Drayton	1299	1343	
Baron Basset of Sapcote (1264)	Simon Basset, 2nd Baron Basset of Sapcote	1282	1300	Died
Baron Basset of Sapcote (1264)	Ralph Basset, 3rd Baron Basset of Sapcote	1300	1326	Never summoned to Parliament
Baron Mowbray (1283)	John de Mowbray, 2nd Baron Mowbray	1297	1322	
Baron Hastings (1290)	John Hastings, 1st Baron Hastings	1290	1313	
Baron Astley (1295)	Andrew of Astley, 1st Baron Astley	1295	1301	Died
Baron Astley (1295)	Nicholas de Astley, 2nd Baron Astley	1301	1314	
Baron Beke (1295)	John Beke, 1st Baron Beke	1295	1304	Died; Barony fell into abeyance
Baron Berkeley (1295)	Thomas de Berkeley, 1st Baron Berkeley	1295	1321	
Baron Boteler (1295)	William le Boteler, 1st Baron Boteler	1295	1328	
Baron Brus (1295)	Robert de Brus, 1st Baron Brus	1295	1304	Died
Baron Brus (1295)	Robert de Brus, 2nd Baron Brus	1304	1306	His estates in England had been taken into the King's hand
Baron Canville (1295)	Geoffrey de Canville, 1st Baron Canville	1295	1308	Died
Baron Canville (1295)	William de Canville, 2nd Baron Canville	1308	1338	
Baron Clavering (1295)	Robert FitzRoger, 1st Baron Clavering	1295	1310	
Baron Corbet (1295)	Peter Corbet, 1st Baron Corbet	1295	1300	Died
Baron Corbet (1295)	Peter Corbet, 2nd Baron Corbet	1300	1322	
Baron Fauconberg (1295)	Walter de Fauconberg, 1st Baron Fauconberg	1295	1304	Died
Baron Fauconberg (1295)	Walter de Fauconberg, 2nd Baron Fauconberg	1304	1318	
Baron FitzAlan (1295)	Brian FitzAlan, 1st Baron FitzAlan	1295	1305	Died, title fell into abeyance
Baron FitzWalter (1295)	Robert FitzWalter, 1st Baron FitzWalter	1295	1325	
Baron FitzWarine (1295)	Fulke FitzWarine, 1st Baron FitzWarine	1295	1315	
Baron FitzWilliam (1295)	Ralph FitzWilliam, 1st Baron FitzWilliam	1295	1315	
Baron Giffard (1295)	John Giffard, 2nd Baron Giffard	1299	1322	
Baron Grey de Wilton (1295)	Reginald de Grey, 1st Baron Grey de Wilton	1295	1308	Died
Baron Grey de Wilton (1295)	John Grey, 2nd Baron Grey de Wilton	1308	1323	
Baron Greystock (1295)	John de Greystock, 1st Baron Greystock	1295	1306	Died, title extinct
Baron Huntercombe (1295)	Walter de Huntercombe, 1st Baron Huntercombe	1295	1312	
Baron Hussee (1295)	Henry Hussee, 1st Baron Hussee	1295	1332	
Baron Hylton (1295)	Robert Hylton, 1st Baron Hylton	1295	1322	
Baron Knovill (1295)	Bogo de Knovill, 1st Baron Knovill	1295	1306	Died
Baron Knovill (1295)	Bogo de Knovill, 2nd Baron Knovill	1306	1338	
Baron Kyme (1295)	Philip de Kyme, 1st Baron Kyme	1295	1323	
Baron Martin (1295)	William Martin, 1st Baron Martin	1295	1325	
Baron Mauley (1295)	Peter de Mauley, 1st Baron Mauley	1295	1310	
Baron Meinill (1295)	Nicholas Meinill, 2nd Baron Meinill	1299	1322	
Baron Montfort (1295)	John de Montfort, 2nd Baron Montfort	1296	1314	
Baron Mortimer of Wigmore (1295)	Edmund Mortimer, 1st Baron Mortimer de Wigmore	1295	1304	Died
Baron Mortimer of Wigmore (1295)	Roger Mortimer, 2nd Baron Mortimer de Wigmore	1304	1330	
Baron Neville de Raby (1295)	Ralph Neville, 1st Baron Neville de Raby	1295	1331	
Baron Plugenet (1295)	Alan de Plugenet, 2nd Baron Plugenet	1299	1326	
Baron Poyntz (1295)	Hugh Poyntz, 1st Baron Poyntz	1295	1308	Died
Baron Poyntz (1295)	Nicholas Poyntz, 2nd Baron Poyntz	1308	1311	
Baron Segrave (1295)	John Segrave, 2nd Baron Segrave	1295	1325	
Baron Segrave of Barton Segrave (1295)	Nicholas de Segrave, 1st Baron Segrave of Barton Segrave	1295	1322	
Baron Strange (1295)	Roger le Strange, Baron Strange	1295	1311	
Baron Tateshall (1295)	Robert de Tateshall, 2nd Baron Tateshall	1298	1303	Died
Baron Tateshall (1295)	Robert de Tateshall, 3rd Baron Tateshall	1303	1306	Died, title extinct
Baron Umfraville (1295)	Gilbert de Umfraville, 1st Baron Umfraville	1295	1307	Died
Baron Umfraville (1295)	Robert de Umfraville, 2nd Baron Umfraville	1307	1325	
Baron Verdun (1295)	Theobald de Verdun, 1st Baron Verdun	1295	1309	Died
Baron Verdun (1295)	Theobald de Verdun, 2nd Baron Verdun	1309	1316	
Baron Wake (1295)	John Wake, 1st Baron Wake	1295	1300	Died
Baron Wake (1295)	Thomas Wake, 2nd Baron Wake of Liddell	1300	1349	
Baron Ap-Adam (1299)	John Ap-Adam, 1st Baron Ap-Adam	1299	1311	
Baron Bardolf (1299)	Hugh Bardolf, 1st Baron Bardolf	1299	1304	Died
Baron Bardolf (1299)	Thomas Bardolf, 2nd Baron Bardolf	1304	1328	
Baron Basset of Weldon (1299)	Richard Basset, 1st Baron Basset of Weldon	1299	1314	
Baron Chaurces (1299)	Thomas de Chaurces, 1st Baron Chaurces	1299	1315	
Baron Clinton (1299)	John de Clinton, 1st Baron Clinton	1299	1310	
Baron de la Mare (1299)	John De La Mare, 1st Baron de la Mare	1299	1316	
Baron De La Warr (1299)	Roger la Warr, 1st Baron De La Warr	1299	1320	
Baron Deincourt (1299)	Edmund Deincourt, 1st Baron Deincourt	1299	1327	
Baron Devereux (1299)	William Devereux, Baron Devereux of Lyonshall	1299	1314	
Baron Engaine (1299)	John Engaine, 1st Baron Engaine	1299	1322	
Baron Ferrers of Chartley (1299)	John de Ferrers, 1st Baron Ferrers of Chartley	1299	1312	
Baron FitzPayne (1299)	Robert FitzPayne, 1st Baron FitzPayne	1299	1316	
Baron Genevill (1299)	Geoffrey de Genevill, 1st Baron Genevill	1299	1307	Died, Barony became dormant
Baron Grandison (1299)	William de Grandison, 1st Baron Grandison	1299	1335	
Baron Hache (1299)	Eustace de Hache, 1st Baron Hache	1299	1306	Died; title extinct
Baron Havering (1299)	John de Havering, 1st Baron Havering	1299	1329	
Baron Lancaster (1299)	Henry Plantagenet, 1st Baron Lancaster	1299	1345	
Baron Leyburn (1299)	William de Leyburn, 1st Baron Leyburn	1299	1310	
Baron Lovel (1299)	John Lovel, 1st Baron Lovel	1299	1311	
Baron Moels (1299)	John de Moels, 1st Baron Moels	1299	1309	Died
Baron Moels (1299)	Nicholas de Moels, 2nd Baron Moels	1309	1315	
Baron Mohun (1299)	John de Mohun, 1st Baron Mohun	1299	1330	
Baron Mortimer of Chirke (1299)	Roger de Mortimer, 1st Baron Mortimer of Chirke	1299	1336	
Baron Mortimer of Richard's Castle (1299)	Hugh de Mortimer, 1st Baron Mortimer of Richard's Castle	1299	1304	Died; Barony fell into abeyance
Baron Multon of Egremont (1299)	Thomas de Multon, 1st Baron Multon of Egremont	1299	1322	
Baron Muncy (1299)	Walter de Muncy, 1st Baron Muncy	1299	1308	Died; title extinct
Baron Percy (1299)	Henry Percy, 1st Baron Percy	1299	1315	
Baron Peyvre (1299)	John Peyvre, 1st Baron Peyvre	1299	1316	
Baron Pinkeny (1299)	Henry de Pinkeney, 1st Baron Pinkeney	1299	1301	Died; Barony extinct
Baron Plessets (1299)	Hugh de Plessets, 1st Baron Plessets	1295	1301	Died; none of his heirs were summoned to the Parliament
Baron Rivers of Ongar (1299)	John Rivers, 1st Baron Rivers	1299	1311	
Baron Saint Amand (1299)	Almaric de St Amand, 1st Baron Saint Amand	1299	1310	
Baron Scales (1299)	Robert de Scales, 1st Baron Scales	1299	1305	Died
Baron Scales (1299)	Robert de Scales, 2nd Baron Scales	1305	1324	
Baron Stafford (1299)	Edmund de Stafford, 1st Baron Stafford	1299	1309	Died
Baron Stafford (1299)	Ralph de Stafford, 2nd Baron Stafford	1309	1372	
Baron Tregoz (1299)	John de Tregoz, 1st Baron Tregoz	1299	1300	Died; Barony in abeyance 1301-1305
Baron Tregoz (1299)	Henry de Tregoz, 2nd Baron Tregoz	1305	1318	
Baron Teyes (1299)	Henry de Teyes, 1st Baron Teyes	1299	1308	Died
Baron Teyes (1299)	Henry de Teyes, 2nd Baron Teyes	1308	1321	
Baron Valence (1299)	Aymer de Valence, 1st Baron Valence	1299	1323	
Baron Vavasour (1299)	William de Vavasour, 1st Baron Vavasour	1299	1313	
Baron Vere (1299)	Hugh de Vere, 1st Baron Vere	1299	1318	
Baron Welles (1299)	Adam de Welles, 1st Baron Welles	1299	1311	
Baron Zouche (1299)	Alan la Zouche, 1st Baron la Zouche of Ashby	1299	1314	
Baron Toni (1299)	Robert de Toni, 1st Baron Toni	1299	1310	
Baron Grandison (1299)	Otho de Grandison, 1st Baron Grandison	1299	1305?	Died; title extinct
Baron Beauchamp of Somerset (1299)	John de Beauchamp, 1st Baron Beauchamp	1299	1336	
Baron Braose (1299)	William de Braose, 1st Baron Braose	1299	1326	
Baron Cauntelo (1299)	William de Cauntelo, 1st Baron Cauntelo	1299	1308	Died
Baron Cauntelo (1299)	William de Cauntelo, 2nd Baron Cauntelo	1308	1321	
Baron Chavent (1299)	Piers de Chavent, 1st Baron Chavent	1299	1303	Died; none of his heirs were summoned to the Parliament
Baron de Clifford (1299)	Robert de Clifford, 1st Baron de Clifford	1299	1314	
Baron Darcy (1299)	Philip Darcy, Baron Darcy	1299	1332	
Baron De La Ward (1299)	Robert de La Ward, 1st Baron De La Ward	1299	1307	Died
Baron De La Ward (1299)	Simon de La Ward, 2nd Baron De La Ward	1307	1324	
Baron Ferrers of Groby (1299)	William Ferrers, 1st Baron Ferrers of Groby	1299	1325	
Baron FitzReginald (1299)	John FitzReginald, 1st Baron FitzReginald	1299	1310	
Baron Furnivall (1299)	Thomas de Furnivall, 1st Baron Furnivall	1299	1332	
Baron Grendon (1299)	Ralph Grendon, 1st Baron Grendon	1299	1331	
Baron Hastings of Inchmahome (1299)	Edmund Hastings, 1st Baron Hastings of Inchmahome	1299	1314	
Baron Lancaster (1299)	John de Lancastre, 1st Baron Lancaster	1299	1334	
Baron Lansladron (1299)	Serlo de Lansladron, 1st Baron Lansladron	1299	1306	Died, title extinct
Baron Latimer (1299)	Thomas Latimer, 1st Baron Latimer	1299	1334	
Baron Latimer (1299)	William Latimer, 1st Baron Latimer	1299	1305	Died
Baron Latimer (1299)	William Latimer, 2nd Baron Latimer	1305	1327	
Baron Lisle (1299)	John de Lisle, 1st Baron Lisle	1299	1304	Died
Baron Lisle (1299)	John de Lisle, 2nd Baron Lisle	1304	1337	
Baron Montagu (1299)	Simon de Montacute, 1st Baron Montagu	1299	1316	
Baron Morley (1299)	William de Morley	1299	1310	
Baron Paynel (1299)	John Paynel, 1st Baron Paynel	1299	1318	
Baron Pecche (1299)	Gilbert Peche	1299	1322	
Baron Rithre (1299)	William de Rithre, 1st Baron Rithre	1299	1310	
Baron Roche (1299)	Thomas de la Roche, 1st Baron Roche	1299	1320	
Baron Saint John of Basing (1299)	John St John, 1st Baron Saint John of Basing	1299	1329	
Baron Saint John of Lageham (1299)	John St John, 1st Baron Saint John of Lageham	1299	1317	
Baron Sampson (1299)	William Sampson, 1st Baron Sampson	1299	1306?	Died
Baron Strange of Knockyn (1299)	John le Strange, 1st Baron Strange of Knockyn	1299	1309	Died
Baron Strange of Knockyn (1299)	John le Strange, 2nd Baron Strange of Knockyn	1309	1311	
Baron Sudeley (1299)	John de Sudeley, 1st Baron Sudeley	1299	1336	
Baron Tuchet (1299)	William Touchet, 1st Baron Touchet	1299	1306	Died
Baron Balliol (1300)	Alexander de Balliol, 1st Baron Balliol	1300	c. 1311	New creation
Baron Ferrers of Groby (1300)	William Ferrers, 1st Baron Ferrers of Groby	1300	1325	New creation
Baron Burghersh (1300)	Robert de Burgersh, 1st Baron Burgersh	1300	1325	New creation; Died; none of his heirs were summoned to the Parliament
Baron Paynel (1303)	William Paynel, 1st Baron Paynel	1303	1317	New creation
Baron Grendon (1305)	Robert de Grendon, 1st Baron Grendon	1305	13??	New creation; nothing further is known of him
Baron Botetourt (1305)	John de Botetourt, 1st Baron Botetourt	1305	1324	New creation
Baron Multon of Gilsland (1307)	Thomas de Multon, 1st Baron Multon of Gilsland	1307	1313	New creation
Baron Thweng (1307)	Marmaduke Thweng, 1st Baron Thweng	1307	1323	New creation
Baron Boteler of Wemme (1308)	William Le Boteler, 1st Baron Boteler of Wemme	1308	1334	New creation
Baron Cromwell (1308)	John de Cromwell, 1st Baron Cromwell	1308	1335	New creation
Baron Grelle (1308)	Thomas de Grelle, 1st Baron Grelle	1308	1347	New creation
Baron Somery (1308)	John de Somery, 1st Baron Somery	1308	1321	New creation
Baron Zouche of Haryngworth (1308)	William la Zouche, 1st Baron Zouche	1308	1352	New creation
Baron Marshal (1309)	William Marshal, 1st Baron Marshal	1309	1314	New creation
Baron Ufford (1309)	Robert de Ufford, 1st Baron Ufford	1309	1316	New creation
Baron Beaumont (1309)	Henry Beaumont, 1st Baron Beaumont	1309	1340	New creation
Baron Cailly (1309)	Thomas de Cailly, 1st Baron Cailly	1309	1317	New creation
Baron Everingham (1309)	Adam Everingham, 1st Baron Everingham	1309	1341	New creation
Baron FitzHenry (1309)	Aucher FitzHenry, 1st Baron FitzHenry	1309	1339	New creation
Baron Gorges (1309)	Ralph de Gorges, 1st Baron Gorges	1309	1324	New creation
Baron Monthermer (1309)	Ralph de Monthermer, 1st Baron Monthermer	1309	1325	New creation
Baron Orreby (1309)	John de Orreby, 1st Baron Orreby	1309	1318	New creation
Baron Strange of Blackmere (1309)	Fulk le Strange, 1st Baron Strange of Blackmere	1309	1324	New creation
Baron Thorpe (1309)	John de Thorpe, 1st Baron Thorpe	1309	1325	New creation
Baron Badlesmere (1309)	Bartholomew de Badlesmere, 1st Baron Badlesmere	1309	1322	New creation
Baron Clare (1309)	Richard de Clare, 1st Baron Clare	1309	1318	New creation

== Peerage of Scotland ==
Title	Holder	Date gained	Date lost	Notes
Earl of Mar (1114)	Gartnait, Earl of Mar	1292	1305	Died
Earl of Mar (1114)	Domhnall II, Earl of Mar	1305	1332	
Earl of Dunbar (1115)	Patrick IV, Earl of March	1289	1308	Died
Earl of Dunbar (1115)	Patrick V, Earl of March	1308	1368	
Earl of Angus (1115)	Gilbert de Umfraville, Earl of Angus	1246	1307	Died
Earl of Angus (1115)	Robert de Umfraville, Earl of Angus	1307	1314	
Earl of Atholl (1115)	John of Strathbogie, Earl of Atholl	1270	1306	Executed, and the title forfeited
Earl of Atholl (1115)	David II Strathbogie, Earl of Atholl	1307	1314	Title restored
Earl of Buchan (1115)	John Comyn, Earl of Buchan	1289	1308	Title forfeited
Earl of Strathearn (1115)	Maol Íosa III, Earl of Strathearn	1271	1317	
Earl of Fife (1129)	Donnchadh IV, Earl of Fife	1288	1353	
Earl of Menteith (1160)	Alexander, Earl of Menteith	1295	1305	Died
Earl of Menteith (1160)	Alan, Earl of Menteith	1305	1308	Died
Earl of Menteith (1160)	Muireadhach III, Earl of Menteith	1308	1333	
Earl of Lennox (1184)	Maol Choluim II, Earl of Lennox	1291	1333	
Earl of Carrick (1184)	Robert Bruce, Earl of Carrick	1292	1306	Became King, and his dignities lapsed to the Crown
Earl of Ross (1215)	Uilleam II, Earl of Ross	1274	1333	
Earl of Sutherland (1235)	William de Moravia, 2nd Earl of Sutherland	1248	1307	Died
Earl of Sutherland (1235)	William de Moravia, 3rd Earl of Sutherland	1307	1325	

== Peerage of Ireland ==
Title	Holder	Date gained	Date lost	Notes
Earl of Ulster (1264)	Richard Óg de Burgh, 2nd Earl of Ulster	1271	1326	
Baron Athenry (1172)	Peter de Bermingham	1262	1307	Died
Baron Athenry (1172)	Rickard de Bermingham	1307	1322	
Baron Kingsale (1223)	Edmund de Courcy, 4th Baron Kingsale	1290	1302	Died
Baron Kingsale (1223)	John de Courcy, 5th Baron Kingsale	1302	1303	Died
Baron Kingsale (1223)	Miles de Courcy, 6th Baron Kingsale	1303	1338	
Baron Kerry (1223)	Maurice Fitzthomas Fitzmaurice, 2nd Baron Kerry	1260	1303	Died
Baron Kerry (1223)	Nicholas Fitzmaurice, 3rd Baron Kerry	1303	1324	
Baron Barry (1261)	John Barry, 4th Baron Barry	1290	1330	

Preceded by List of peers 1290–1299	Lists of peers by decade 1300–1309	Succeeded by List of peers 1310–1319
