= List of peers 1310–1319 =

This page lists all peers who held extant titles between 1310 and 1319.

== Peerage of England ==
| Title | Holder | Date gained | Date lost | Notes |
|---|---|---|---|---|
| Earl of Surrey (1088) | John de Warenne, 7th Earl of Surrey | 1304 | 1347 | |
| Earl of Warwick (1088) | Guy de Beauchamp, 10th Earl of Warwick | 1298 | 1315 | Died |
| Earl of Warwick (1088) | Thomas de Beauchamp, 11th Earl of Warwick | 1315 | 1369 | |
| Earl of Gloucester (1122) | Gilbert de Clare, 8th Earl of Gloucester | 1295 | 1314 | Died, title extinct |
| Earl of Arundel (1138) | Edmund FitzAlan, 9th Earl of Arundel | 1302 | 1326 | |
| Earl of Oxford (1142) | Robert de Vere, 6th Earl of Oxford | 1297 | 1331 | |
| Earl of Salisbury (1145) | Margaret Longespée, 4th Countess of Salisbury | 1261 | 1310 | |
| Earl of Salisbury (1145) | Alice de Lacy, 5th Countess of Salisbury | 1310 | 1322 | |
| Earl of Hereford (1199) | Humphrey de Bohun, 4th Earl of Hereford | 1298 | 1322 | |
| Earl of Lincoln (1217) | Henry de Lacy, 3rd Earl of Lincoln | 1266 | 1311 | Died |
| Earl of Lincoln (1217) | Alice de Lacy, 4th Countess of Lincoln | 1311 | 1348 | |
| Earl of Pembroke (1247) | Aymer de Valence, 2nd Earl of Pembroke | 1296 | 1324 | |
| Earl of Leicester (1265) | Thomas Plantagenet, 2nd Earl of Leicester and Lancaster | 1296 | 1322 | |
| Earl of Richmond (1306) | John of Brittany, Earl of Richmond | 1306 | 1334 | |
| Earl of Cornwall (1307) | Piers Gaveston, 1st Earl of Cornwall | 1307 | 1312 | Died, title extinct |
| Earl of Norfolk (1312) | Thomas of Brotherton, 1st Earl of Norfolk | 1312 | 1338 | New creation |
| Baron de Ros (1264) | William de Ros, 1st Baron de Ros | 1285 | 1316 | Died |
| Baron de Ros (1264) | William de Ros, 2nd Baron de Ros | 1216 | 1342 | |
| Baron le Despencer (1264) | Hugh le Despencer, 2nd Baron le Despencer | 1265 | 1326 | |
| Baron Basset of Drayton (1264) | Ralph Basset, 2nd Baron Basset of Drayton | 1299 | 1343 | |
| Baron Basset of Sapcote (1264) | Ralph Basset, 3rd baron Basset of Sapcote | 1300 | 1326 | Never summoned to Parliament |
| Baron Mowbray (1283) | John de Mowbray, 2nd Baron Mowbray | 1297 | 1322 | |
| Baron Hastings (1290) | John Hastings, 1st Baron Hastings | 1290 | 1313 | Died |
| Baron Hastings (1290) | John Hastings, 2nd Baron Hastings | 1313 | 1325 | |
| Baron Astley (1295) | Nicholas de Astley, 2nd Baron Astley | 1301 | 1314 | Died |
| Baron Astley (1295) | Thomas de Astley, 3rd Baron Astley | 1314 | 1359 | |
| Baron Berkeley (1295) | Thomas de Berkeley, 1st Baron Berkeley | 1295 | 1321 | |
| Baron Boteler (1295) | William le Boteler, 1st Baron Boteler | 1295 | 1328 | |
| Baron Canville (1295) | William de Canville, 2nd Baron Canville | 1308 | 1338 | |
| Baron Clavering (1295) | Robert FitzRoger, 1st Baron Clavering | 1295 | 1310 | Died |
| Baron Clavering (1295) | John de Clavering, 2nd Baron Clavering | 1310 | 1332 | |
| Baron Corbet (1295) | Piers Corbet, 2nd Baron Corbet | 1300 | 1322 | |
| Baron Fauconberg (1295) | Walter de Fauconberg, 2nd Baron Fauconberg | 1304 | 1318 | Died |
| Baron Fauconberg (1295) | John de Fauconberg, 3rd Baron Fauconberg | 1318 | 1349 | |
| Baron FitzWalter (1295) | Robert FitzWalter, 1st Baron FitzWalter | 1295 | 1325 | |
| Baron FitzWarine (1295) | Fulke FitzWarine, 1st Baron FitzWarine | 1295 | 1315 | Died |
| Baron FitzWarine (1295) | Fulke FitzWarine, 2nd Baron FitzWarine | 1315 | 1349 | |
| Baron FitzWilliam (1295) | Ralph FitzWilliam, 1st Baron FitzWilliam | 1295 | 1315 | Died |
| Baron FitzWilliam (1295) | Robert FitzWilliam, 2nd Baron FitzWilliam | 1315 | 1317 | |
| Baron FitzWilliam (1295) | Ralph FitzWilliam, 3rd Baron FitzWilliam | 1317 | 1321 | |
| Baron Giffard (1295) | John Giffard, 2nd Baron Giffard | 1299 | 1322 | |
| Baron Grey de Wilton (1295) | John Grey, 2nd Baron Grey de Wilton | 1308 | 1323 | |
| Baron Huntercombe (1295) | Walter de Huntercombe, 1st Baron Huntercombe | 1295 | 1312 | Died, title extinct |
| Baron Hussee (1295) | Henry Hussee, 1st Baron Hussee | 1295 | 1332 | |
| Baron Hylton (1295) | Robert Hylton, 1st Baron Hylton | 1295 | 1322 | |
| Baron Knovill (1295) | Bogo de Knovill, 2nd Baron Knovill | 1306 | 1338 | |
| Baron Kyme (1295) | Philip de Kyme, 1st Baron Kyme | 1295 | 1323 | |
| Baron Martin (1295) | William Martin, 1st Baron Martin | 1295 | 1325 | |
| Baron Mauley (1295) | Peter de Mauley, 1st Baron Mauley | 1295 | 1310 | Died |
| Baron Mauley (1295) | Peter de Mauley, 2nd Baron Mauley | 1310 | 1355 | |
| Baron Meinill (1295) | Nicholas Meinill, 2nd Baron Meinill | 1299 | 1322 | |
| Baron Montfort (1295) | John de Montfort, 2nd Baron Montfort | 1296 | 1314 | Died |
| Baron Montfort (1295) | Peter de Montfort, 3rd Baron Montfort | 1314 | 1367 | |
| Baron Mortimer of Wigmore (1295) | Roger de Mortimer, 2nd Baron Mortimer de Wigmore | 1304 | 1330 | |
| Baron Neville de Raby (1295) | Ralph Neville, 1st Baron Neville de Raby | 1295 | 1331 | |
| Baron Plugenet (1295) | Alan de Plugenet, 2nd Baron Plugenet | 1299 | 1326 | |
| Baron Poyntz (1295) | Nicholas Poyntz, 2nd Baron Poyntz | 1308 | 1311 | Died |
| Baron Poyntz (1295) | Hugh Poyntz, 3rd Baron Poyntz | 1311 | 1333 | |
| Baron Segrave (1295) | John de Segrave, 2nd Baron Segrave | 1295 | 1325 | |
| Baron Segrave of Barton Segrave (1295) | Nicholas de Segrave, 1st Baron Segrave of Barton Segrave | 1295 | 1322 | |
| Baron Strange (1295) | Roger Le Strange, 1st Baron Strange | 1295 | 1311 | Died, Barony became dormant |
| Baron Umfraville (1295) | Robert de Umfraville, 2nd Baron Umfraville | 1307 | 1325 | |
| Baron Verdun (1295) | Theobald de Verdun, 2nd Baron Verdun | 1309 | 1316 | Died, Barony fell into abeyance |
| Baron Wake (1295) | John Wake, 1st Baron Wake | 1300 | 1349 | |
| Baron Ap-Adam (1299) | John Ap-Adam, 1st Baron Ap-Adam | 1299 | 1311 | Died; none of his heirs were summoned to Parliament in respect of this Barony |
| Baron Bardolf (1299) | Thomas Bardolf, 2nd Baron Bardolf | 1304 | 1328 | |
| Baron Basset of Weldon (1299) | Richard Basset, 1st Baron Basset of Weldon | 1299 | 1314 | Died; none of his heirs were summoned to Parliament in respect of this Barony |
| Baron Braose (1299) | William de Braose, 2nd Baron Braose | 1299 | 1326 | Died, Barony fell into abeyance |
| Baron Chaurces (1299) | Thomas de Chaurces, 1st Baron Chaurces | 1299 | 1315 | Died; none of his heirs were summoned to Parliament in respect of this Barony |
| Baron Clinton (1299) | John de Clinton, 1st Baron Clinton | 1299 | 1310 | Died |
| Baron Clinton (1299) | John de Clinton, 2nd Baron Clinton | 1310 | 1335 | |
| Baron de la Mare (1299) | John De La Mare, 1st Baron de la Mare | 1299 | 1316 | Died, title extinct |
| Baron De La Warr (1299) | Roger la Warr, 1st Baron De La Warr | 1299 | 1320 | |
| Baron Deincourt (1299) | Edmund Deincourt, 1st Baron Deincourt | 1299 | 1327 | |
| Baron Devereux (1299) | William Devereux, 1st Baron Devereux | 1299 | 1330? | |
| Baron Engaine (1299) | John Engaine, 1st Baron Engaine | 1299 | 1322 | |
| Baron Ferrers of Chartley (1299) | John de Ferrers, 1st Baron Ferrers of Chartley | 1299 | 1312 | Died |
| Baron Ferrers of Chartley (1299) | John de Ferrers, 2nd Baron Ferrers of Chartley | 1312 | c1324 | |
| Baron FitzPayne (1299) | Robert FitzPayne, 1st Baron FitzPayne | 1299 | 1316 | Died |
| Baron FitzPayne (1299) | Robert FitzPayne, 2nd Baron FitzPayne | 1316 | 1354 | |
| Baron Grandison (1299) | William de Grandison, 1st Baron Grandison | 1299 | 1335 | |
| Baron Havering (1299) | John de Havering, 1st Baron Havering | 1299 | 1329 | |
| Baron Lancaster (1299) | Henry Plantagenet, 1st Baron Lancaster | 1299 | 1345 | |
| Baron Leyburn (1299) | William de Leyburn, 1st Baron Leyburn | 1299 | 1310 | Died; none of his heirs were summoned to Parliament in respect of this Barony |
| Baron Lovel (1299) | John Lovel, 1st Baron Lovel | 1299 | 1311 | Died |
| Baron Lovel (1299) | John Lovel, 2nd Baron Lovel | 1311 | 1314 | |
| Baron Lovel (1299) | John Lovel, 3rd Baron Lovel | 1314 | 1347 | |
| Baron Moels (1299) | Nicholas de Moels, 2nd Baron Moels | 1309 | 1315 | Died; none of his heirs were summoned to Parliament in respect of this Barony |
| Baron Mohun (1299) | John de Mohun, 1st Baron Mohun | 1299 | 1330 | |
| Baron Mortimer of Chirke (1299) | Roger de Mortimer, 1st Baron Mortimer of Chirke | 1299 | 1336 | |
| Baron Multon of Egremont (1299) | Thomas de Multon, 1st Baron Multon of Egremont | 1299 | 1322 | |
| Baron Percy (1299) | Henry de Percy, 1st Baron Percy | 1299 | 1315 | Died |
| Baron Percy (1299) | Henry de Percy, 2nd Baron Percy | 1315 | 1352 | |
| Baron Peyvre (1299) | Johny Peyvre, 1st Baron Peyvre | 1299 | 1316 | Died; Barony probably terminated |
| Baron Rivers of Ongar (1299) | John Rivers, 1st Baron Rivers | 1299 | 1311 | Died |
| Baron Rivers of Ongar (1299) | John Rivers, 2nd Baron Rivers | 1311 | 1350 | |
| Baron Saint Amand (1299) | Almaric de St Amand, 1st Baron Saint Amand | 1299 | 1310 | Died, Barony extinct |
| Baron Scales (1299) | Robert de Scales, 2nd Baron Scales | 1305 | 1324 | |
| Baron Stafford (1299) | Ralph de Stafford, 2nd Baron Stafford | 1309 | 1372 | |
| Baron Tregoz (1299) | Henry de Tregoz, 2nd Baron Tregoz | 1305 | 1322 | |
| Baron Teyes (1299) | Henry de Teyes, 2nd Baron Teyes | 1308 | 1321 | |
| Baron Valence (1299) | Aymer de Valence, 1st Baron Valence | 1299 | 1323 | |
| Baron Vavasour (1299) | William de Vavasour, 1st Baron Vavasour | 1299 | 1313 | Died |
| Baron Vavasour (1299) | Walter de Vavasour, 2nd Baron Vavasour | 1313 | 1325 | |
| Baron Vere (1299) | Hugh de Vere, 1st Baron Vere | 1299 | 1318 | Died, Barony extinct |
| Baron Welles (1299) | Adam de Welles, 1st Baron Welles | 1299 | 1311 | Died |
| Baron Welles (1299) | Robert de Welles, 2nd Baron Welles | 1311 | 1320 | |
| Baron Zouche (1299) | Alan La Zouche, 1st Baron Zouche | 1299 | 1314 | Died, Barony fell into abeyance |
| Baron Toni (1299) | Robert de Toni, 1st Baron Toni | 1299 | 1310 | Died, Barony extinct |
| Baron Beauchamp of Somerset (1299) | John de Beauchamp, 1st Baron Beauchamp | 1299 | 1336 | |
| Baron Cauntelo (1299) | William de Cauntelo, 2nd Baron Cauntelo | 1308 | 1321 | |
| Baron de Clifford (1299) | Robert de Clifford, 1st Baron de Clifford | 1299 | 1314 | Died |
| Baron de Clifford (1299) | Roger de Clifford, 2nd Baron de Clifford | 1314 | 1322 | |
| Baron Darcy (1299) | Philip Darcy, Baron Darcy | 1299 | 1332 | |
| Baron De La Ward (1299) | Simon de La Ward, 2nd Baron De La Ward | 1307 | 1324 | |
| Baron Ferrers of Groby (1299) | William Ferrers, 1st Baron Ferrers of Groby | 1299 | 1325 | |
| Baron FitzReginald (1299) | John FitzReginald, 1st Baron FitzReginald | 1299 | 1310 | Died; none of his heirs were summoned to Parliament in respect of this Barony |
| Baron Furnivall (1299) | Thomas de Furnivall, 1st Baron Furnivall | 1299 | 1332 | |
| Baron Grendon (1299) | Ralph Grendon, 1st Baron Grendon | 1299 | 1331 | |
| Baron Hastings of Inchmahome (1299) | Edmund Hastings, 1st Baron Hastings of Inchmahome | 1299 | 1314 | Died, title extinct |
| Baron Lancaster (1299) | John de Lancastre, 1st Baron Lancaster | 1299 | 1334 | |
| Baron Latimer (1299) | Thomas Latimer, 1st Baron Latimer | 1299 | 1334 | |
| Baron Latimer (1299) | William Latimer, 2nd Baron Latimer | 1305 | 1327 | |
| Baron Lisle (1299) | John de Lisle, 2nd Baron Lisle | 1304 | 1337 | |
| Baron Montagu (1299) | Simon de Montacute, 1st Baron Montagu | 1299 | 1316 | Died |
| Baron Montagu (1299) | William de Montacute, 2nd Baron Montagu | 1316 | 1319 | Died |
| Baron Montagu (1299) | William de Montacute, 3rd Baron Montagu | 1319 | 1344 | |
| Baron Morley (1299) | William de Morley | 1299 | 1310 | Died |
| Baron Morley (1299) | Robert de Morley, 2nd Baron Morley | 1310 | 1360 | |
| Baron Paynel (1299) | John Paynel, 1st Baron Paynel | 1299 | 1318 | Died |
| Baron Pecche (1299) | Gilbert Peche | 1299 | 1322 | |
| Baron Rithre (1299) | William de Rithre, 1st Baron Rithre | 1299 | 1310 | Died; none of his heirs were summoned to Parliament in respect of this Barony |
| Baron Roche (1299) | Thomas de la Roche, 1st Baron Roche | 1299 | 1320 | |
| Baron Saint John of Basing (1299) | John St John, 1st Baron Saint John of Basing | 1299 | 1329 | |
| Baron Saint John of Lageham (1299) | John St John, 1st Baron Saint John of Lageham | 1299 | 1317 | Died |
| Baron Saint John of Lageham (1299) | John St John, 2nd Baron Saint John of Lageham | 1317 | 1323 | |
| Baron Strange of Knockyn (1299) | John le Strange, 2nd Baron Strange of Knockyn | 1309 | 1311 | Died |
| Baron Strange of Knockyn (1299) | John le Strange, 3rd Baron Strange of Knockyn | 1311 | 1324 | |
| Baron Sudeley (1299) | John de Sudeley, 1st Baron Sudeley | 1299 | 1336 | |
| Baron Balliol (1300) | Alexander de Balliol, 1st Baron Balliol | 1300 | c. 1311 | Attainted and his honours became forfeited |
| Baron Paynel (1303) | William Paynel, 1st Baron Paynel | 1303 | 1317 | Died |
| Baron Paynel (1303) | John Paynel, 2nd Baron Paynel | 1317 | 1319 | Died |
| Baron Botetourt (1305) | John de Botetourt, 1st Baron Botetourt | 1305 | 1324 | |
| Baron Multon of Gilsland (1307) | Thomas de Multon, 1st Baron Multon of Gilsland | 1307 | 1313 | Died |
| Baron Multon of Gilsland (1307) | John de Multon, 2nd Baron Multon of Gilsland | 1313 | 1334 | |
| Baron Thweng (1307) | Marmaduke de Thweng, 1st Baron Thweng | 1307 | 1323 | |
| Baron Boteler of Wemme (1308) | William Le Boteler, 1st Baron Boteler of Wemme | 1308 | 1334 | |
| Baron Cromwell (1308) | John de Cromwell, 1st Baron Cromwell | 1308 | 1335 | |
| Baron Grelle (1308) | Thomas de Grelle, 1st Baron Grelle | 1308 | 1347 | |
| Baron Somery (1308) | John de Somery, 1st Baron Somery | 1308 | 1321 | |
| Baron Zouche of Haryngworth (1308) | William la Zouche, 1st Baron Zouche | 1308 | 1352 | |
| Baron Marshal (1309) | William Marshal, 1st Baron Marshal | 1309 | 1314 | Died; none of his heirs were summoned to Parliament in respect of this Barony |
| Baron Ufford (1309) | Robert de Ufford, 1st Baron Ufford | 1309 | 1316 | Died |
| Baron Ufford (1309) | Robert de Ufford, 2nd Baron Ufford | 1316 | 1369 | |
| Baron Beaumont (1309) | Henry Beaumont, 1st Baron Beaumont | 1309 | 1340 | |
| Baron Cailly (1309) | Thomas de Cailly, 1st Baron Cailly | 1309 | 1317 | Died, Barony became extinct |
| Baron Everingham (1309) | Adam Everingham, 1st Baron Everingham | 1309 | 1341 | |
| Baron FitzHenry (1309) | Aucher FitzHenry, 1st Baron FitzHenry | 1309 | 1339 | |
| Baron Gorges (1309) | Ralph de Gorges, 1st Baron Gorges | 1309 | 1324 | |
| Baron Monthermer (1309) | Ralph de Monthermer, 1st Baron Monthermer | 1309 | 1325 | |
| Baron Orreby (1309) | John de Orreby, 1st Baron Orreby | 1309 | 1318 | Died; none of his heirs were summoned to Parliament in respect of this Barony |
| Baron Strange of Blackmere (1309) | Fulk le Strange, 1st Baron Strange of Blackmere | 1309 | 1324 | |
| Baron Thorpe (1309) | John de Thorpe, 1st Baron Thorpe | 1309 | 1325 | |
| Baron Badlesmere (1309) | Bartholomew de Badlesmere, 1st Baron Badlesmere | 1309 | 1322 | |
| Baron Clare (1309) | Richard de Clare, 1st Baron Clare | 1309 | 1318 | Died, Barony became extinct |
| Baron Burnell (1311) | Edward Burnell, 1st Baron Burnell | 1311 | 1315 | New creation, died, Barony became extinct |
| Baron Echingham (1311) | William de Echingham, 1st Baron Echingham | 1311 | 1326 | New creation |
| Baron Hastang (1311) | Robert Hastang, 1st Baron Hastang | 1311 | c. 1320 | New creation; died, none of his heirs were summoned to Parliament in respect of this Barony |
| Baron Lisle (1311) | Robert de Lisle, 1st Baron Lisle | 1311 | 1343 | New creation |
| Baron Nevill (1311) | Hugh de Nevill, 1st Baron Nevill | 1311 | 1336 | New creation |
| Baron Audley of Heleigh (1313) | Nicholas de Audley, 1st Baron Audley of Heleigh | 1313 | 1316 | New creation, died |
| Baron Audley of Heleigh (1313) | James de Audley, 2nd Baron Audley of Heleigh | 1316 | 1386 | |
| Baron Bavent (1313) | Roger Bavent, 1st Baron Bavent | 1313 | 1335 | New creation |
| Baron Brun (1313) | Maurice le Brun, 1st Baron Brun | 1313 | 1355 | New creation |
| Baron Cobham of Kent (1313) | Henry de Cobham, 1st Baron Cobham of Kent | 1313 | 1339 | New creation |
| Baron Felton (1313) | Robert de Felton, 1st Baron Felton | 1313 | 1314 | New creation; died, none of his heirs were summoned to Parliament in respect of this Barony |
| Baron FitzBernard (1313) | Thomas Fitzbernard, 1st Baron Fitzbernard | 1313 | Bef. 1334 | New creation |
| Baron Northwode (1313) | John de Northwode, 1st Baron Northwode | 1313 | 1319 | New creation, died |
| Baron Northwode (1313) | Roger de Northwode, 2nd Baron Northwode | 1319 | 1361 | |
| Baron Stapleton (1313) | Miles Stapleton, 1st Baron Stapleton | 1313 | 1314 | New creation; died, none of his heirs were summoned to Parliament in respect of this Barony |
| Baron Vesci (1313) | William de Vesci, 1st Baron Vesci | 1313 | 1314 | New creation; died, Barony became extinct |
| Baron Saint Amand (1313) | John de St Amand, 1st Baron Saint Amand | 1313 | 1330 | New creation |
| Baron Cherleton (1313) | John Cherleton, 1st Baron Cherleton | 1313 | 1353 | New creation |
| Baron Marmion (1313) | John Marmion, 1st Baron Marmion | 1313 | 1323 | New creation |
| Baron Say (1313) | Geoffrey de Say, 1st Baron Say | 1313 | 1322 | New creation |
| Baron Willoughby de Eresby (1313) | Robert de Willoughby, 1st Baron Willoughby de Eresby | 1313 | 1317 | New creation; died |
| Baron Willoughby de Eresby (1313) | John de Willoughby, 2nd Baron Willoughby de Eresby | 1317 | 1349 | |
| Baron Saint Maur (1313) | Nicholas St Maur, 1st Baron Saint Maur | 1313 | 1317 | New creation; died, none of his heirs were summoned to Parliament in respect of this Barony |
| Baron Camoys (1313) | Ralph de Camoys, 1st Baron Camoys | 1313 | 1335 | New creation |
| Baron Columbers (1314) | Philip de Columbers, 1st Baron Columbers | 1314 | 1342 | New creation |
| Baron le Despencer (1314) | Hugh Despencer, 1st Lord Despencer | 1314 | 1326 | New creation |
| Baron Holand (1314) | Robert de Holland, 1st Baron Holand | 1314 | 1328 | New creation |
| Baron Audley (1317) | Hugh de Audley, 1st Baron Audley | 1317 | 1347 | New creation |
| Baron D'Amorie (1317) | Roger D'Amorie, 1st Baron D'Amorie | 1317 | 1322 | New creation |
| Baron Plaiz (1317) | Richard de Playz, 1st Baron Playz | 1317 | 1327 | New creation |
| Baron Saint Maur (1317) | William de St Maur, 1st Baron Saint Maru | 1317 | 1322 | New creation |

== Peerage of Scotland ==
| Title | Holder | Date gained | Date lost | Notes |
|---|---|---|---|---|
| Earl of Mar (1114) | Domhnall II, Earl of Mar | 1305 | 1332 | |
| Earl of Dunbar (1115) | Patrick V, Earl of March | 1308 | 1368 | |
| Earl of Angus (1115) | Robert de Umfraville, Earl of Angus | 1307 | 1314 | Title forfeited |
| Earl of Atholl (1115) | David II Strathbogie, Earl of Atholl | 1307 | 1314 | Title forfeited |
| Earl of Strathearn (1115) | Maol Íosa III, Earl of Strathearn | 1271 | 1317 | Died |
| Earl of Strathearn (1115) | Maol Íosa IV, Earl of Strathearn | 1317 | 1329 | |
| Earl of Fife (1129) | Donnchadh IV, Earl of Fife | 1288 | 1353 | |
| Earl of Menteith (1160) | Muireadhach III, Earl of Menteith | 1308 | 1333 | |
| Earl of Lennox (1184) | Maol Choluim II, Earl of Lennox | 1291 | 1333 | |
| Earl of Ross (1215) | Uilleam II, Earl of Ross | 1274 | 1333 | |
| Earl of Sutherland (1235) | William de Moravia, 3rd Earl of Sutherland | 1307 | 1325 | |
| Earl of Moray (1312) | Thomas Randolph, 1st Earl of Moray | 1312 | 1332 | New creation |
| Earl of Carrick (1314) | Edward Bruce, Earl of Carrick | 1312 | 1318 | New creation; died, and the Earldom reverted to the Crown |

== Peerage of Ireland ==
| Title | Holder | Date gained | Date lost | Notes |
|---|---|---|---|---|
| Earl of Ulster (1264) | Richard Óg de Burgh, 2nd Earl of Ulster | 1271 | 1326 | |
| Earl of Kildare (1316) | John FitzGerald, 1st Earl of Kildare | 1316 | 1316 | New creation; died |
| Earl of Kildare (1316) | Thomas FitzGerald, 2nd Earl of Kildare | 1316 | 1328 | |
| Earl of Louth (1319) | John de Bermingham, 1st Earl of Louth | 1319 | 1329 | New creation |
| Baron Athenry (1172) | Rickard de Bermingham | 1307 | 1322 | |
| Baron Kingsale (1223) | Miles de Courcy, 6th Baron Kingsale | 1303 | 1338 | |
| Baron Kerry (1223) | Nicholas Fitzmaurice, 3rd Baron Kerry | 1303 | 1324 | |
| Baron Barry (1261) | John Barry, 4th Baron Barry | 1290 | 1330 | |

| Preceded by List of peers 1300–1309 | Lists of peers by decade 1310–1319 | Succeeded by List of peers 1320–1329 |
