= List of peers 1320–1329 =

This page lists all peers who held extant titles between 1320 and 1329.

== Peerage of England ==
Title	Holder	Date gained	Date lost	Notes
Earl of Surrey (1088)	John de Warenne, 7th Earl of Surrey	1304	1347	
Earl of Warwick (1088)	Thomas de Beauchamp, 11th Earl of Warwick	1315	1369	
Earl of Arundel (1138)	Edmund FitzAlan, 9th Earl of Arundel	1302	1326	Attainted and his honours were forfeited
Earl of Oxford (1142)	Robert de Vere, 6th Earl of Oxford	1297	1331	
Earl of Salisbury (1145)	Alice de Lacy, 5th Countess of Salisbury	1310	1322	Surrendered to the Crown
Earl of Hereford (1199)	Humphrey de Bohun, 4th Earl of Hereford	1298	1322	Died
Earl of Hereford (1199)	John de Bohun, 5th Earl of Hereford	1322	1336	
Earl of Lincoln (1217)	Alice de Lacy, 4th Countess of Lincoln	1311	1348	
Earl of Pembroke (1247)	Aymer de Valence, 2nd Earl of Pembroke	1296	1324	Died, title reverted to the Crown
Earl of Leicester (1265)	Thomas Plantagenet, 2nd Earl of Leicester and Lancaster	1296	1322	Attainted, and his honours were forfeited
Earl of Leicester (1265)	Henry Plantagenet, 3rd Earl of Leicester and Lancaster	1326	1345	Restored
Earl of Richmond (1306)	John of Brittany, Earl of Richmond	1306	1334	
Earl of Norfolk (1312)	Thomas of Brotherton, 1st Earl of Norfolk	1312	1338	
Earl of Kent (1321)	Edmund of Woodstock, 1st Earl of Kent	1321	1330	New creation
Earl of Carlisle (1322)	Andrew Harclay, 1st Earl of Carlisle	1322	1323	Created Baron Harcla in 1321; attainted, and the title was forfeited
Earl of Winchester (1322)	Hugh le Despenser, 1st Earl of Winchester	1322	1326	Forfeited
Earl of March (1328)	Roger Mortimer, 1st Earl of March	1328	1330	New creation
Baron de Ros (1264)	William de Ros, 2nd Baron de Ros	1216	1342	
Baron le Despencer (1264)	Hugh le Despencer, 2nd Baron le Despencer	1265	1326	Created Earl of Winchester, see above; barony attainted in 1326
Baron Basset of Drayton (1264)	Ralph Basset, 2nd Baron Basset of Drayton	1299	1343	
Baron Basset of Sapcote (1264)	Ralph Basset, 3rd Baron Basset of Sapcote	1300	1326	Never summoned to Parliament; died
Baron Basset of Sapcote (1264)	Simon Basset, 4th Baron Basset of Sapcote	1326	1360	Never summoned to Parliament
Baron Mowbray (1283)	John de Mowbray, 2nd Baron Mowbray	1297	1322	Died
Baron Mowbray (1283)	John de Mowbray, 3rd Baron Mowbray	1322	1361	
Baron Hastings (1290)	John Hastings, 2nd Baron Hastings	1313	1325	Died
Baron Hastings (1290)	Laurence Hastings, 3rd Baron Hastings	1325	1348	
Baron Astley (1295)	Thomas de Astley, 3rd Baron Astley	1314	1359	
Baron Berkeley (1295)	Thomas de Berkeley, 1st Baron Berkeley	1295	1321	Died
Baron Berkeley (1295)	Maurice de Berkeley, 2nd Baron Berkeley	1321	1326	Died
Baron Berkeley (1295)	Thomas de Berkeley, 3rd Baron Berkeley	1326	1361	
Baron Boteler (1295)	William le Boteler, 1st Baron Boteler	1295	1328	Died; none of his descendants were summoned to Parliament in respect of this Barony
Baron Canville (1295)	William de Canville, 2nd Baron Canville	1308	1338	
Baron Clavering (1295)	John de Clavering, 2nd Baron Clavering	1310	1332	
Baron Corbet (1295)	Piers Corbet, 2nd Baron Corbet	1300	1322	Died
Baron Corbet (1295)	John Corbet, 3rd Baron Corbet	1322	1347	
Baron Fauconberg (1295)	John de Fauconberg, 3rd Baron Fauconberg	1318	1349	
Baron FitzWalter (1295)	Robert FitzWalter, 1st Baron FitzWalter	1295	1325	Died
Baron FitzWalter (1295)	Robert FitzWalter, 2nd Baron FitzWalter	1325	1328	Died
Baron FitzWalter (1295)	John FitzWalter, 3rd Baron FitzWalter	1328	1361	
Baron FitzWarine (1295)	Fulke FitzWarine, 2nd Baron FitzWarine	1315	1349	
Baron FitzWilliam (1295)	Ralph FitzWilliam, 3rd Baron FitzWilliam	1317	1321	Summoned as Baron Greystock, see below
Baron Giffard (1295)	John Giffard, 2nd Baron Giffard	1299	1322	Attainted, and his honours were forfeited
Baron Grey de Wilton (1295)	John Grey, 2nd Baron Grey de Wilton	1308	1323	Died
Baron Grey de Wilton (1295)	Henry Grey, 3rd Baron Grey de Wilton	1323	1342	
Baron Hussee (1295)	Henry Hussee, 1st Baron Hussee	1295	1332	
Baron Hylton (1295)	Robert Hylton, 1st Baron Hylton	1295	1322	Died
Baron Hylton (1295)	Alexander Hylton, 2nd Baron Hylton	1322	1360	
Baron Knovill (1295)	Bogo de Knovill, 2nd Baron Knovill	1306	1338	
Baron Kyme (1295)	Philip de Kyme, 1st Baron Kyme	1295	1323	Died
Baron Kyme (1295)	William de Kyme, 2nd Baron Kyme	1323	1338	
Baron Martin (1295)	William Martin, 1st Baron Martin	1295	1325	Died
Baron Martin (1295)	William Martin, 2nd Baron Martin	1325	1326	Died, Barony fell into abeyance
Baron Mauley (1295)	Peter de Mauley, 2nd Baron Mauley	1310	1355	
Baron Meinill (1295)	Nicholas Meinill, 2nd Baron Meinill	1299	1322	Died, Barony became dormant
Baron Montfort (1295)	Peter de Montfort, 3rd Baron Montfort	1314	1367	
Baron Mortimer of Wigmore (1295)	Roger de Mortimer, 2nd Baron Mortimer de Wigmore	1304	1330	Created Earl of March in 1328, see above; title held by the Earls of March until 1461 when it merged into Crown
Baron Neville de Raby(1295)	Ralph Neville, 1st Baron Neville de Raby	1295	1331	
Baron Plugenet (1295)	Alan de Plugenet, 2nd Baron Plugenet	1299	1326	Died, title extinct
Baron Poyntz (1295)	Hugh Poyntz, 3rd Baron Poyntz	1311	1333	
Baron Segrave (1295)	John de Segrave, 2nd Baron Segrave	1295	1325	Died
Baron Segrave (1295)	John de Segrave, 3rd Baron Segrave	1325	1353	
Baron Segrave of Barton Segrave (1295)	Nicholas de Segrave, 1st Baron Segrave of Barton Segrave	1295	1322	Died
Baron Segrave of Barton Segrave (1295)	Maud de Segrave, Baroness Segrave of Barton Segrave	1322	1330	Died, title extinct
Baron Umfraville (1295)	Robert de Umfraville, 2nd Baron Umfraville	1307	1325	Died
Baron Umfraville (1295)	Gilbert de Umfraville, 3rd Baron Umfraville	1325	1381	
Baron Wake (1295)	John Wake, 1st Baron Wake	1300	1349	
Baron Bardolf (1299)	Thomas Bardolf, 2nd Baron Bardolf	1304	1328	Died
Baron Bardolf (1299)	John Bardolf, 3rd Baron Bardolf	1328	1363	
Baron Clinton (1299)	John de Clinton, 2nd Baron Clinton	1310	1335	
Baron De La Warr (1299)	Roger la Warr, 1st Baron De La Warr	1299	1320	Died
Baron De La Warr (1299)	John la Warr, 2nd Baron De La Warr	1320	1347	
Baron Deincourt (1299)	Edmund Deincourt, 1st Baron Deincourt	1299	1327	Died
Baron Deincourt (1299)	William Deincourt, 2nd Baron Deincourt	1327	1364	
Baron Devereux (1299)	William Devereux, 1st Baron Devereux	1299	1330?	
Baron Engaine (1299)	John Engaine, 1st Baron Engaine	1299	1322	Died, Barony extinct
Baron Ferrers of Chartley (1299)	John de Ferrers, 2nd Baron Ferrers of Chartley	1312	c1324	Died
Baron Ferrers of Chartley (1299)	Robert de Ferrers, 3rd Baron Ferrers of Chartley	c1324	1350	
Baron FitzPayne (1299)	Robert FitzPayne, 2nd Baron FitzPayne	1316	1354	
Baron Grandison (1299)	William de Grandison, 1st Baron Grandison	1299	1335	
Baron Havering (1299)	John de Havering, 1st Baron Havering	1299	1329	Peerage extinct or dormant
Baron Lancaster (1299)	Henry Plantagenet, 1st Baron Lancaster	1299	1345	Restored as Earl of Lancaster, see above
Baron Lovel (1299)	John Lovel, 3rd Baron Lovel	1314	1347	
Baron Mohun (1299)	John de Mohun, 1st Baron Mohun	1299	1330	
Baron Mortimer of Chirke (1299)	Roger de Mortimer, 1st Baron Mortimer of Chirke	1299	1336	
Baron Multon of Egremont (1299)	Thomas de Multon, 1st Baron Multon of Egremont	1299	1322	Died
Baron Multon of Egremont (1299)	John de Multon, 2nd Baron Multon of Egremont	1322	1334	
Baron Percy (1299)	Henry de Percy, 2nd Baron Percy	1315	1352	
Baron Rivers of Ongar (1299)	John Rivers, 2nd Baron Rivers	1311	1350	
Baron Scales (1299)	Robert de Scales, 2nd Baron Scales	1305	1324	Died
Baron Scales (1299)	Robert de Scales, 3rd Baron Scales	1324	1369	
Baron Stafford (1299)	Ralph de Stafford, 2nd Baron Stafford	1309	1372	
Baron Tregoz (1299)	Henry de Tregoz, 2nd Baron Tregoz	1305	1322	Died
Baron Tregoz (1299)	Thomas de Tregoz, 3rd Baron Tregoz	1322	1405	
Baron Teyes (1299)	Henry de Teyes, 2nd Baron Teyes	1308	1321	Attainted, and the Barony was forfeited
Baron Valence (1299)	Aymer de Valence, 1st Baron Valence	1299	1323	Died, Barony extinct
Baron Vavasour (1299)	Walter de Vavasour, 2nd Baron Vavasour	1313	1325	Died; none of his descendants were summoned to Parliament in respect of this Barony
Baron Welles (1299)	Robert de Welles, 2nd Baron Welles	1311	1320	Died
Baron Welles (1299)	Adam de Welles, 3rd Baron Welles	1320	1345	
Baron Beauchamp of Somerset (1299)	John de Beauchamp, 1st Baron Beauchamp	1299	1336	
Baron Braose (1299)	William de Braose, 2nd Baron Braose	1299	1326	Died, Barony fell into abeyance
Baron Cauntelo (1299)	William de Cauntelo, 2nd Baron Cauntelo	1308	1321	Died
Baron Cauntelo (1299)	Nicholas de Cauntelo, 3rd Baron Cauntelo	1321	1355	
Baron de Clifford (1299)	Roger de Clifford, 2nd Baron de Clifford	1314	1322	Died
Baron de Clifford (1299)	Robert de Clifford, 3rd Baron de Clifford	1322	1344	
Baron Darcy (1299)	Philip Darcy, Baron Darcy	1299	1332	
Baron De La Ward (1299)	Simon de La Ward, 2nd Baron De La Ward	1307	1324	Died, Barony fell into abeyance
Baron Ferrers of Groby (1299)	William Ferrers, 1st Baron Ferrers of Groby	1299	1325	Died
Baron Ferrers of Groby (1299)	Henry Ferrers, 2nd Baron Ferrers of Groby	1325	1343	
Baron Furnivall (1299)	Thomas de Furnivall, 1st Baron Furnivall	1299	1332	
Baron Grendon (1299)	Ralph Grendon, 1st Baron Grendon	1299	1331	
Baron Lancaster (1299)	John de Lancastre, 1st Baron Lancaster	1299	1334	
Baron Latimer (1299)	Thomas Latimer, 1st Baron Latimer	1299	1334	
Baron Latimer (1299)	William Latimer, 2nd Baron Latimer	1305	1327	Died
Baron Latimer (1299)	William Latimer, 3rd Baron Latimer	1327	1335	
Baron Lisle (1299)	John de Lisle, 2nd Baron Lisle	1304	1337	
Baron Montagu (1299)	William de Montacute, 3rd Baron Montagu	1319	1344	
Baron Morley (1299)	Robert de Morley, 2nd Baron Morley	1310	1360	
Baron Pecche (1299)	Gilbert Peche, 1st Baron Peche	1299	1322	Died; none of his heirs were summoned to Parliament in respect of this Barony
Baron Roche (1299)	Thomas de la Roche, 1st Baron Roche	1299	1320	Died
Baron Saint John of Basing (1299)	John St John, 1st Baron Saint John of Basing	1299	1329	Died
Baron Saint John of Lageham (1299)	John St John, 2nd Baron Saint John of Lageham	1317	1323	Died
Baron Saint John of Lageham (1299)	John St John, 3rd Baron Saint John of Lageham	1323	1349	
Baron Strange of Knockyn (1299)	John le Strange, 3rd Baron Strange of Knockyn	1311	1324	Died
Baron Strange of Knockyn (1299)	Roger le Strange, 4th Baron Strange of Knockyn	1324	1349	
Baron Sudeley (1299)	John de Sudeley, 1st Baron Sudeley	1299	1336	
Baron Botetourt (1305)	John de Botetourt, 1st Baron Botetourt	1305	1324	Died
Baron Botetourt (1305)	John de Botetourt, 2nd Baron Botetourt	1324	1385	
Baron Multon of Gilsland (1307)	John de Multon, 2nd Baron Multon of Gilsland	1313	1334	
Baron Thweng (1307)	Marmaduke de Thweng, 1st Baron Thweng	1307	1323	Died; none of his heirs were summoned to Parliament in respect of this Barony
Baron Boteler of Wemme (1308)	William Le Boteler, 1st Baron Boteler of Wemme	1308	1334	
Baron Cromwell (1308)	John de Cromwell, 1st Baron Cromwell	1308	1335	
Baron Grelle (1308)	Thomas de Grelle, 1st Baron Grelle	1308	1347	
Baron Somery (1308)	John de Somery, 1st Baron Somery	1308	1321	Died, Barony became extinct
Baron Zouche of Haryngworth (1308)	William la Zouche, 1st Baron Zouche	1308	1352	
Baron Ufford (1309)	Robert de Ufford, 2nd Baron Ufford	1316	1369	
Baron Beaumont (1309)	Henry Beaumont, 1st Baron Beaumont	1309	1340	
Baron Everingham (1309)	Adam Everingham, 1st Baron Everingham	1309	1341	
Baron FitzHenry (1309)	Aucher FitzHenry, 1st Baron FitzHenry	1309	1339	
Baron Gorges (1309)	Ralph de Gorges, 1st Baron Gorges	1309	1324	Died, Barony fell into abeyance
Baron Monthermer (1309)	Ralph de Monthermer, 1st Baron Monthermer	1309	1325	Died
Baron Monthermer (1309)	Thomas de Monthermer, 2nd Baron Monthermer	1325	1340	
Baron Strange of Blackmere (1309)	Fulk le Strange, 1st Baron Strange of Blackmere	1309	1324	Died
Baron Strange of Blackmere (1309)	John le Strange, 2nd Baron Strange of Blackmere	1324	1349	
Baron Thorpe (1309)	John de Thorpe, 1st Baron Thorpe	1309	1325	Died, Barony extinct
Baron Badlesmere (1309)	Bartholomew de Badlesmere, 1st Baron Badlesmere	1309	1322	Died
Baron Badlesmere (1309)	Giles de Badlesmere, 2nd Baron Badlesmere	1322	1338	
Baron Echingham (1311)	William de Echingham, 1st Baron Echingham	1311	1326	Died, Barony became extinct
Baron Lisle (1311)	Robert de Lisle, 1st Baron Lisle	1311	1343	
Baron Nevill (1311)	Hugh de Nevill, 1st Baron Nevill	1311	1336	
Baron Audley of Heleigh (1313)	James de Audley, 2nd Baron Audley of Heleigh	1316	1386	
Baron Bavent (1313)	Roger Bavent, 1st Baron Bavent	1313	1335	
Baron Brun (1313)	Maurice le Brun, 1st Baron Brun	1313	1355	
Baron Cobham of Kent (1313)	Henry de Cobham, 1st Baron Cobham of Kent	1313	1339	
Baron FitzBernard (1313)	Thomas Fitzbernard, 1st Baron Fitzbernard	1313	Bef. 1334	
Baron Northwode (1313)	Roger de Northwode, 2nd Baron Northwode	1319	1361	
Baron Saint Amand (1313)	John de St Amand, 1st Baron Saint Amand	1313	1330	
Baron Cherleton (1313)	John Cherleton, 1st Baron Cherleton	1313	1353	
Baron Marmion (1313)	John Marmion, 1st Baron Marmion	1313	1323	Died
Baron Marmion (1313)	John Marmion, 2nd Baron Marmion	1323	1335	
Baron Say (1313)	Geoffrey de Say, 1st Baron Say	1313	1322	Died
Baron Say (1313)	Geoffrey de Say, 2nd Baron Say	1322	1359	
Baron Willoughby de Eresby (1313)	John de Willoughby, 2nd Baron Willoughby de Eresby	1317	1349	
Baron Camoys (1313)	Ralph de Camoys, 1st Baron Camoys	1313	1335	
Baron Columbers (1314)	Philip de Columbers, 1st Baron Columbers	1314	1342	
Baron le Despencer (1314)	Hugh Despencer, 1st Lord Despencer	1314	1326	All his honours became forfeited
Baron Holand (1314)	Robert de Holland, 1st Baron Holand	1314	1328	Died
Baron Holand (1314)	Robert de Holland, 2nd Baron Holand	1328	1373	
Baron Audley (1317)	Hugh de Audley, 1st Baron Audley	1317	1347	
Baron D'Amorie (1317)	Roger D'Amorie, 1st Baron D'Amorie	1317	1322	Attainted and his honours were forfeited
Baron Plaiz (1317)	Richard de Playz, 1st Baron Playz	1317	1327	Died, none of his heirs were summoned to Parliament in respect of this Barony
Baron Saint Maur (1317)	William de St Maur, 1st Baron Saint Maur	1317	1322	Died
Baron Strabolgi (1318)	David Strabolgi, 1st Baron Strabolgi	1318	1326	Died
Baron Strabolgi (1318)	David Strabolgi, 2nd Baron Strabolgi	1326	1335	
Baron Arcedekne (1321)	Thomas le Arcedekne, 1st Baron Arcedekne	1321	1329	New creation, died
Baron Arcedekne (1321)	John le Arcedekne, 2nd Baron Arcedekne	1329	1350	
Baron Audley of Stratton Audley (1321)	Hugh de Audley, 1st Baron Audley of Stratton Audley	1321	1325	New creation; title forfeited by attainder
Baron Dacre (1321)	Ralph Dacre, 1st Baron Dacre	1321	1339	New creation
Baron FitzHugh (1321)	Henry FitzHugh, 1st Baron FitzHugh	1321	1356	New creation
Baron Greystock (1321)	Ralph de Greystock, 1st Baron Greystock	1321	1323	New creation, died
Baron Greystock (1321)	William de Greystock, 2nd Baron Greystock	1323	1358	
Baron Lucy (1321)	Anthony de Lucy, 1st Baron Lucy	1321	1343	New creation
Baron Pecche of Wormleighton (1321)	John Peche, 1st Baron Peche	1321	1339	New creation
Baron Waleys (1321)	Richard Waleys, 1st Baron Waleys	1321	?	New creation
Baron Zouche of Mortimer (1323)	William la Zouche, 1st Baron Zouche of Mortimer	1323	1337	New creation
Baron Cobham (1324)	Ralph de Cobham, 1st Baron Cobham	1324	1325	New creation; died, title extinct
Baron Grey of Ruthyn (1325)	Roger Grey, 1st Baron Grey de Ruthyn	1324	1353	New creation
Baron Harington (1326)	John Harington, 1st Baron Harington	1324	1347	New creation
Baron Blount (1326)	Thomas le Blount, 1st Baron Blount	1326	1330	New creation
Baron Cobham of Rundale (1326)	Stephen de Cobham, 1st Baron Cobham of Rundale	1326	1332	New creation
Baron D'Amorie (1326)	Richard D'Amorie, 1st Baron D'Amorie	1326	1330	New creation
Baron Strange (1326)	Eubulus le Strange, 1st Baron Strange	1326	1335	New creation
Baron Swillington (1326)	Adam Swillington, 1st Baron Swillington	1326	1328	New creation; died, title became extinct
Baron Wateville (1326)	Robert Wateville, 1st Baron Wateville	1326	1333	New creation
Baron Burgh (1327)	William de Burgh, 1st Baron Burgh	1327	1333	New creation
Baron Ingham (1328)	Oliver de Ingham, 1st Baron Ingham	1328	1344	New creation

== Peerage of Scotland ==
Title	Holder	Date gained	Date lost	Notes
Earl of Mar (1114)	Domhnall II, Earl of Mar	1305	1332	
Earl of Dunbar (1115)	Patrick V, Earl of March	1308	1368	
Earl of Strathearn (1115)	Maol Íosa IV, Earl of Strathearn	1317	1329	Died
Earl of Strathearn (1115)	Maol Íosa V, Earl of Strathearn	1329	1334	
Earl of Fife (1129)	Donnchadh IV, Earl of Fife	1288	1353	
Earl of Menteith (1160)	Muireadhach III, Earl of Menteith	1308	1333	
Earl of Lennox (1184)	Maol Choluim II, Earl of Lennox	1291	1333	
Earl of Ross (1215)	Uilleam II, Earl of Ross	1274	1333	
Earl of Sutherland (1235)	William de Moravia, 3rd Earl of Sutherland	1307	1330	
Earl of Moray (1312)	Thomas Randolph, 1st Earl of Moray	1312	1332	
Earl of Atholl (1320)	John Campbell, Earl of Atholl	1320	1333	New creation

== Peerage of Ireland ==
Title	Holder	Date gained	Date lost	Notes
Earl of Ulster (1264)	Richard Óg de Burgh, 2nd Earl of Ulster	1271	1326	Died
Earl of Ulster (1264)	William Donn de Burgh, 3rd Earl of Ulster	1326	1333	
Earl of Kildare (1316)	Thomas FitzGerald, 2nd Earl of Kildare	1316	1328	Died
Earl of Kildare (1316)	Richard FitzGerald, 3rd Earl of Kildare	1328	1329	Died
Earl of Kildare (1316)	Maurice FitzGerald, 4th Earl of Kildare	1329	1390	
Earl of Louth (1319)	John de Bermingham, 1st Earl of Louth	1319	1329	Died, title extinct
Earl of Ormond (1328)	James Butler, 1st Earl of Ormond	1328	1338	New creation
Earl of Desmond (1329)	Maurice FitzGerald, 1st Earl of Desmond	1329	1356	New creation
Baron Athenry (1172)	Rickard de Bermingham	1307	1322	Died
Baron Athenry (1172)	Thomas de Bermingham	1322	1374	
Baron Kingsale (1223)	Miles de Courcy, 6th Baron Kingsale	1303	1338	
Baron Kerry (1223)	Nicholas Fitzmaurice, 3rd Baron Kerry	1303	1324	Died
Baron Kerry (1223)	Maurice Fitzmaurice, 4th Baron Kerry	1324	1339	
Baron Barry (1261)	John Barry, 4th Baron Barry	1290	1330	

Preceded by List of peers 1310–1319	Lists of peers by decade 1320–1329	Succeeded by List of peers 1330–1339
