= Barons' Letter of 1301 =

Letter repudiating papal claims to Scotland

Barons' Letter, 1301, exemplar A

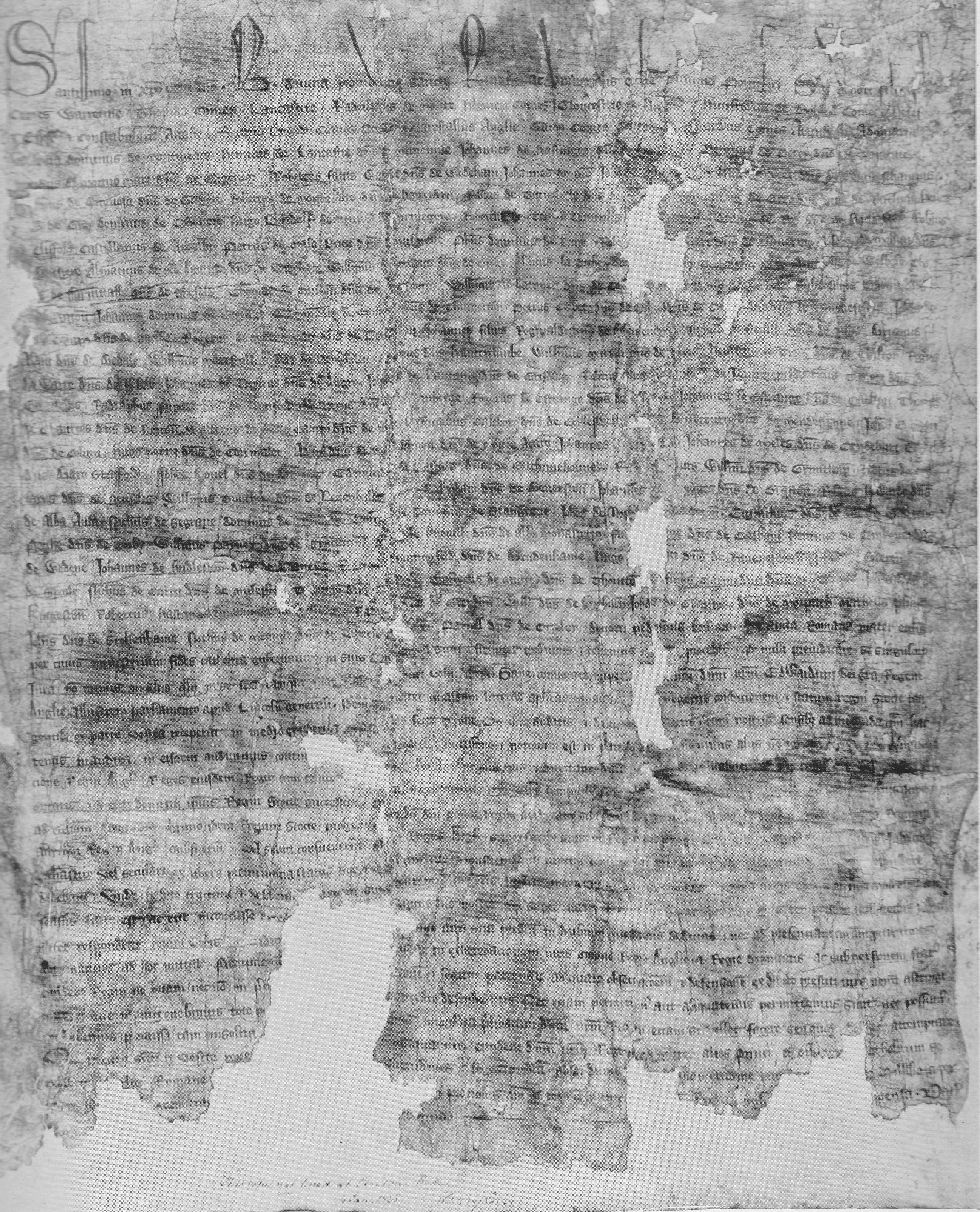
Letter A

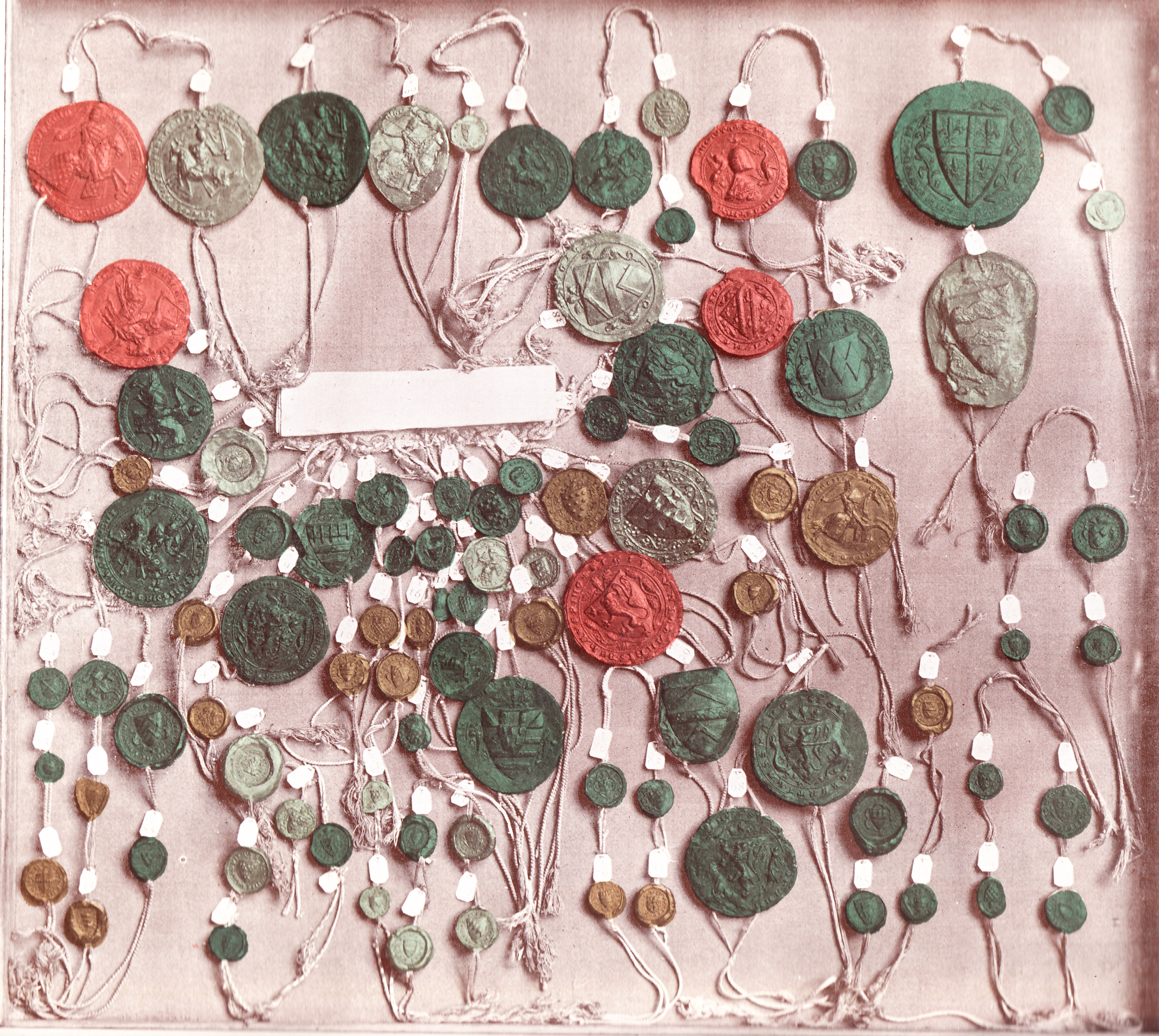
Seals A

Barons' Letter, 1301, exemplar B

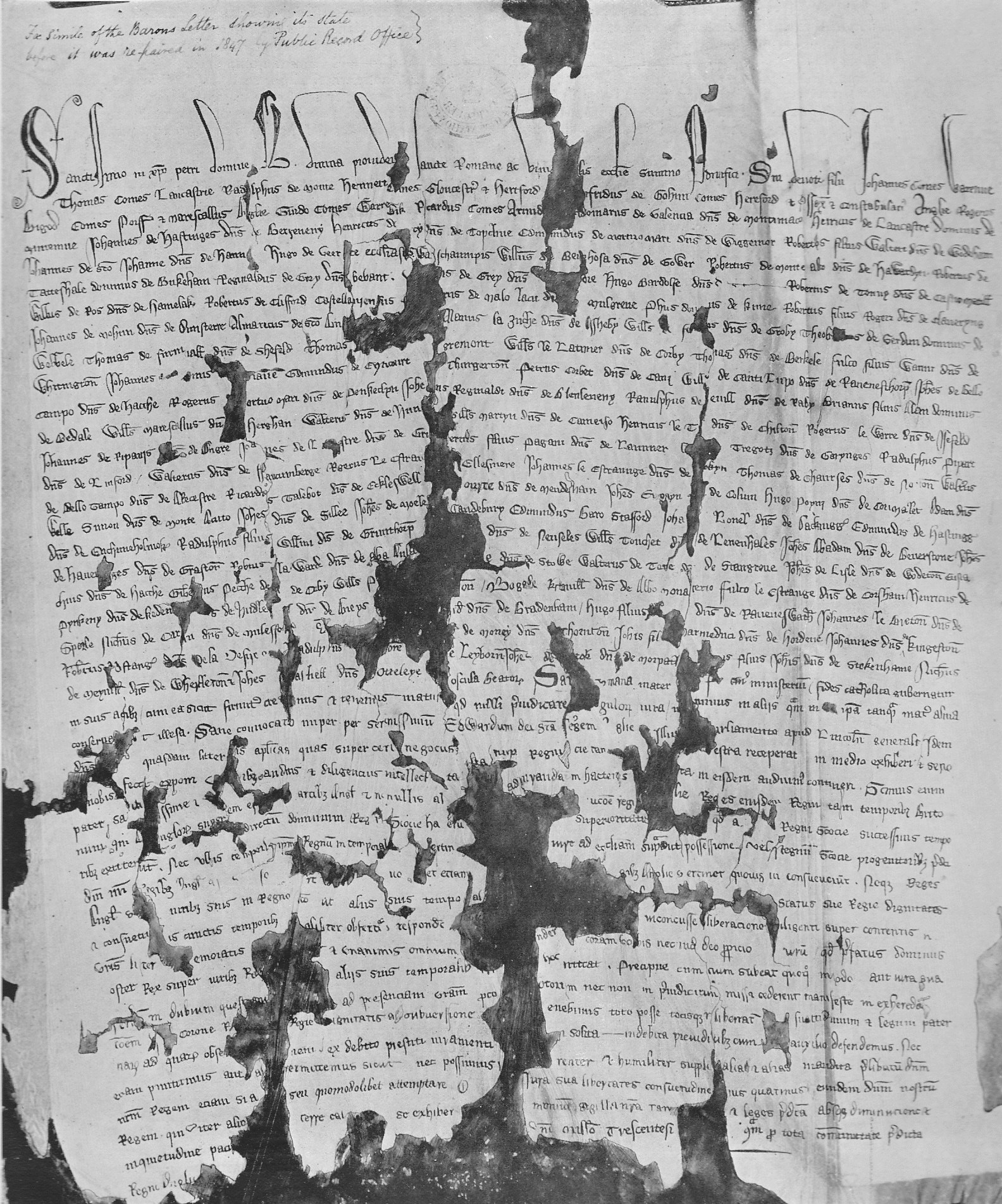
Letter B

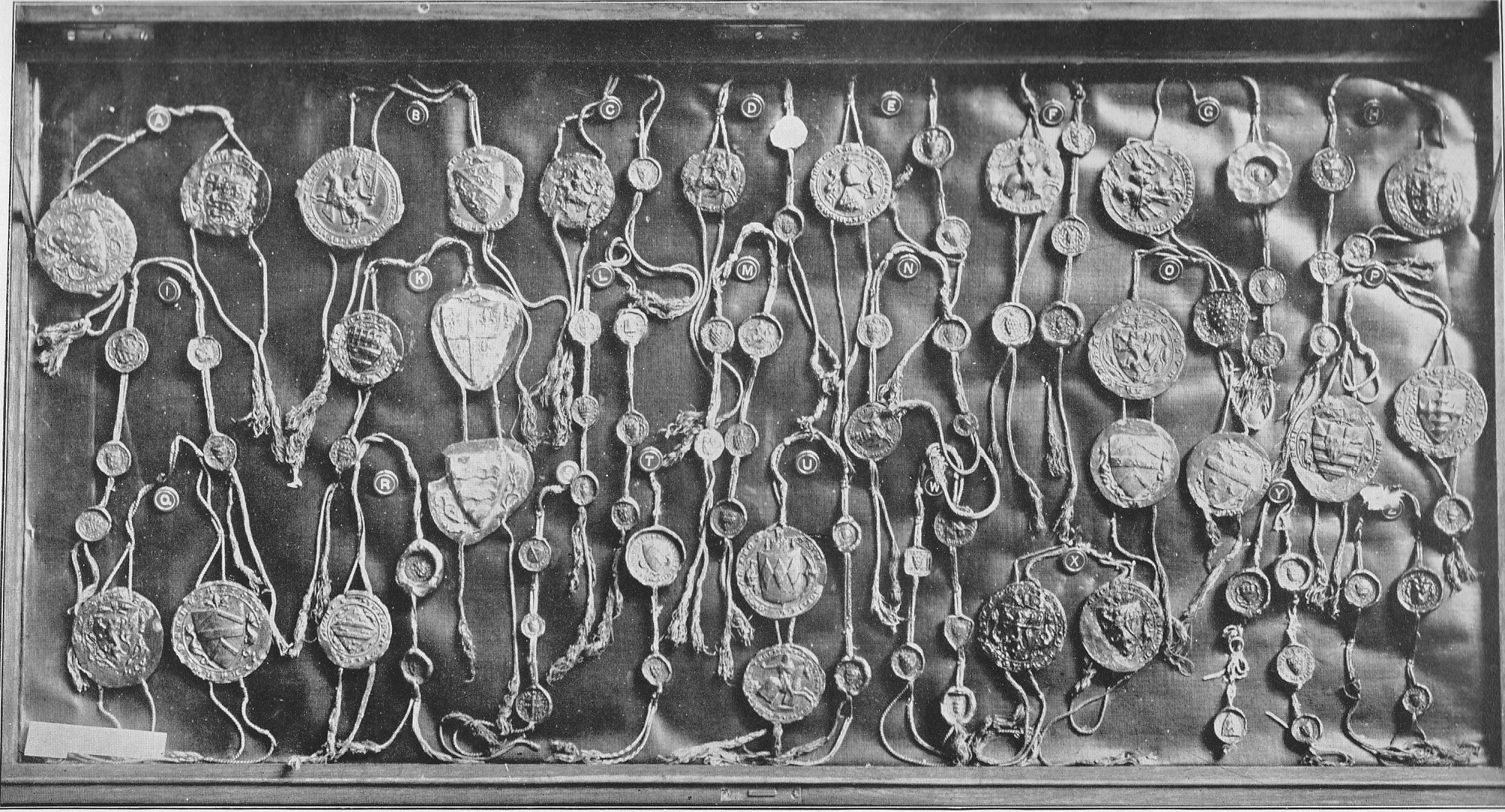
Seals B

The Barons' Letter of 1301 was written by 103 English, Scottish, Norman and Welsh, earls and barons loyal to King Edward I. The letter was addressed to Pope Boniface VIII as a repudiation of his claim of feudal overlordship of Scotland (expressed in the Bull Scimus Fili), and as a defence of the rights of King Edward I of England as overlord of Scotland. The letter survives in two copies, known as A and B, both held in the National Archives at Kew under the reference E 26. Historically they were held amongst the documents in the Exchequer, Treasury of the Receipt department.

== Creation ==
The occasion of the letter was a meeting of the Parliament of England held at Lincoln. It is addressed to the Pope, referred to as "most Holy Father", and dated from Lincoln on "12 February 1300" (at the time, the start of the New Year varied among different countries, and had been tied in England since the Norman Conquest to 25 March, the Feast of the Annunciation; thus, 24 March 1300 was followed by 25 March 1301). The letter explains in its text

At a general Parliament lately summoned at Lincoln by the most serene Lord Edward, by the grace of God, illustrious King of England, the same our Lord the King caused lately to be displayed in our midst and to be explained to us certain Apostolic letters which he had received on your part concerning certain matters affecting the condition and state of the kingdom...

The seals of the signatories to the letter survive in excellent condition. Although they are now detached from the document, they form the earliest contemporary group of true coats of arms, the rules of heraldry having only been established at around the start of the 13th century, and were stated for that reason by Lord Howard de Walden to be of very great value to students of heraldry. Many of the armorials also appear in the near contemporary Falkirk Roll of Arms made before the Battle of Falkirk in 1298 and in the near contemporaneous stained glass shields in Dorchester Abbey, Oxfordshire. Many are also Blazoned in verse in the Roll of Caerlaverock of 1300.

== Purpose ==
The letter was written by English barons (mainly feudal barons and a few barons by writ) as a repudiation to the pope of his claim to feudal overlordship of Scotland, which he had expressed in a papal bull dated 27 June 1299 at Anagni. The bull was addressed to King Edward I of England and it was delivered by Robert Winchelsey, Archbishop of Canterbury at Sweetheart Abbey in Galloway, Scotland, on 26th or 27 August 1300. The bull is preserved in the National Archives at Kew under reference SC 7/6/10.

The king sought the advice of William of Sardinia, a former Dean of Arches to the Archbishop, as to what his response should be, and was presented with various options set out in a letter preserved in the National Archives (C/47/31/15). The Papal bill had been delivered to the king at a sensitive moment, just after the hard-won English victory at the Siege of Caerlaverock Castle over the Scots. Following their defeat at the Battle of Falkirk in 1298 the Scots had appealed to the pope for his protection, yet the English had fought to subject their northern neighbour and were not about to release it from under their control, perhaps only to rise up again against them.

The French were the real movers of the pope's claim, having suggested the move to him as a means to effect protection of the Scots, then their allies under the Auld Alliance, and were themselves allied with the Scots against the English. An English attack on a kingdom the feudal overlord of which was the pope would be virtually unthinkable in political and religious terms. There was thus no question of the English even considering the pope's claim, and the tone of the barons' reply to him is one of anger and open defiance, devoid of almost any of the diplomatic niceties with which the papal bull was replete.

In the event, the Barons' Letter was never sent to the pope, as events changed rapidly to such an extent that it appeared superfluous. A letter to the same effect from the king had however been sent to the pope; it is now held in the Vatican Archives with a copy in the National Archives at Kew under reference C 54/118. It was stored away within the archives of the Exchequer, where the two copies of it remained for several centuries until transferred to Public Record Office under the custody of the Master of the Rolls before 1903 and more recently transferred to the National Archives at Kew.

== Seals ==
The letter was composed and sealed at the parliament specially convened for the purpose of replying to the Pope's letter held at Lincoln between 13–20 January 1301. To it were summoned 9 earls and 80 barons, yet 7 earls and 96 barons are recorded in the letter itself as co-authors. Those barons who did not answer the summons sealed the letter later.

The seals appended by hempen cords to Exemplar B were "tricked" (i.e. reproduced by drawing) by Lancaster Herald Nicholas Charles in 1611. He also made a transcript of Exemplar B., which clearly was then in a better state of preservation than today. Whilst his drawings provide much detail which is otherwise difficult to see in photographs of the seals themselves, some of his transcripts of the legends are inaccurate.

In 1903 Lord Howard de Walden published Charles' drawings and a facsimile of his transcript, and also two sets of photographic images of the seals from Exemplar A; firstly of all the surviving individual cords of seals in colour (showing one face only of each seal), and secondly black and white images of each constituent seal on the cord, obverse and reverse (where existing). The number of surviving seals (series unspecified) is given as 95 by the National Archives catalogue entry, and as 72 (7 earls and 65 barons) by Brian Timms. Photographic images were published by Brian Timms on his heraldry website.

== List of the barons who sealed the letter ==
#	Latinised name in letter (English translation); Standard identification; Legend (obverse/reverse)	Cord (A series) on which affixed	Seal (obverse, reverse), 1904 photo (A series); 1611 drawing (B series)	Arms
1	Johannes Comes Warenne (John Earl Warenne); John de Warenne, Earl of Surrey; S(IGILLUM) JOH(ANN)IS DE WARENNIA COMITIS DE SURREIA / SIGILLUM JOHANNIS COMITIS DE WARENNIA		Barons' Letter, 1301, exemplar A	
2	Thomas Comes Lancastrie (Thomas Earl of Lancaster) – Thomas, 2nd Earl of Lancaster; S(IGILLUM) THOM(A)E COMITIS LANCAST LEYCESTRIE ET DE FERRARIIS		Barons' Letter, 1301, exemplar A	
3	Radulphus de Monte Hermerii Comes Gloucestr & Hertford (Ralph de Monthermer Earl of Gloucester & Hertford); Ralph de Monthermer, 1st Baron Monthermer; S(IGILLUM) (T?) RADULFI DE MONTE HERMERII COM(ITIS) GLOUERNIE ET HERTFORD / S RADULFI DE MONTE HERMERII COM(ITIS) GLOUERNIE ET HERTF			
4	Humfridus de Bohun Comes Hereford & Essex & Constabulari Anglie (Humfrey de Bohun Earl of Hereford & Essex & Constable of England); Humphrey de Bohun, 4th Earl of Hereford; S(IGILLUM) H DE BOHUN COMITIS HEREFORD ET CONSTABULAR(II) ANGL(IAE) / S(IGILLUM) HUMFRIDI D3E BOHUN COMITIT HEREFORDIE ET ESSEXIE			
5	Rogerus Bigo Comes Norff' & Marescallus Anglie (Roger Bigod Earl of Norfolk & Marshall of England); Roger Bigod, 5th Earl of Norfolk; SIGILLUM ROGERI BIGOD (seal of Roger Bigod)			
6	Ricardus Comes Arundell (Richard Earl Arundel); Richard FitzAlan, Earl of Arundel; SIGILLUM RICARDI COMITIS DE ARUNDELL (seal of Richard Earl of Arundell)			
7	Guido Comes Warrewik (Guy Earl Warwick); Guy de Beauchamp, 10th Earl of Warwick; S(IGILLUM) GWIDONIS DE BELLO CAMPO COM WARREWYK/ S GUIDONIS DE BELLOCAMPO COMITIS WARREWIK (seal of Guy de Beauchamp Earl of Warwick)			
8	Adomarus de Valencia D(omi)n(u)s de Moniniaco (Aylmer de Valence Lord of Moniniaco); Aymer de Valence, 2nd Earl of Pembroke; SIGILLUM ADOMARI DE VALENCE			
9	Will(elmu)s D(omi)n(u)s de Leyborn (William Lord of Leyburn) – William (d. 1310), son of Roger de Leybourne (1215-1271), Governor of Carlisle; S(IGILLUM) WILLIELMI DE LEYBURN			
10	Henricus de Lancastre Dominus de Munemue (Henry of Lancaster Lord of Monmouth); Henry, 3rd Earl of Lancaster			
11	Will(elmu)s le Latimer D(omi)n(u)s de Corby (William le Latimer Lord of Corby); William Latimer, 1st Baron Latimer			
12	Edmundus de Hastingg Dns de Enchimeholmok (Edmund de Hastings, Lord of Inchmahome) – Edmund Hastings, 1st Baron Hastings (younger brother of (13) Johannes de Hastinges Dns de Bergaveny)			
13	Johannes de Hastinges Dns de Bergaveny (John de Hastings, Lord of Bergavenny) – John Hastings, 1st Baron Hastings (elder brother of (12) Edmundus de Hastingg Dns de Enchimeholmok)			
14	Edmundus de Motuomari Dns de Wiggemor (Edmund Mortimer, Lord of Wigmore) – Edmund Mortimer, 2nd Baron Mortimer; S(IGILLUM) EDMUNDI DE MORTUOMARI (seal of Edmund from "the dead sea")			
15	Fulco filius Warini Dns de Whitington (Fulk, son of Warin, Lord of Whittington) – Fulk FitzWarin, 1st Baron FitzWarin, Lord of Whittington, Shropshire; SIGILLUM FULCONIS FILLII WARINI (seal of Fulk son of Warin)			
16	Henricus de Percy, Dns de Topclive (Henry de Percy, Lord of Topcliffe) – Henry Percy, 1st Baron Percy; SIGILLUM HENRICI DE PERCY /SIGILLUM HENRICI DE PERCI			
17	Theobaldus de Verdon, Dominus de Webbele (Theobald de Verdon, Lord of Weobley); Theobald de Verdon, 1st Baron Verdon			
18	Robertus filus Walteri, Dns de Wodeham (Robert son of Walter, Lord of Wodeham) – Robert FitzWalter, 1st Baron FitzWalter (1247-1326) of Woodham Walter and Little Dunmow, Essex			
19	Johes Dns de Sullee (John, Lord of Sudeley) – John de Sudeley, 1st Baron Sudeley			
20	Johannes de Sco Johanne, Dns de Hannak (John St John, Lord of Halnaker, Sussex)			
21	Johes de Bello Campo, Dns de Hacche (John de Beauchamp, Lord of Hatch) – John Beauchamp, 1st Baron Beauchamp of Somerset			
22	Johannis de Hudleston, Dns de Aneys (John de Hodleston, Lord of Aneys)			
23	Willus de Breuhosa Dns de Gower (William de Braose, Lord of Gower) – William de Braose, 2nd Baron Braose			
24	Johannes Botetourte, Dns de Mendesham (John Botetourt, Lord of Mendlesham, Suffolk) – John Botetourt, 1st Baron Botetourt			
25	Reginaldus de Grey, Dns de Ruthyn (Reynold/Reginald de Grey, Lord of Ruthin) – Reynold Grey, 1st Baron Grey of Wilton			
26	Johes de Moeles, Dns de Caudebury (John de Moels, Lord of Cadbury) – John Moels, 1st Baron Moels			
27	Johes filius Reginaldi, Dns de Blenleveny (John son of Reginald, Lord of Blaenllynfi); S(IGILLUM) JOHANNIS FILII REGINALDI (seal of John son of Reginald) - John FitzReginald			
28	Almericus de Sco Amando Dns de Widehaye (Almeric de Saint Amand, Lord of Widehaye) - Almaric de St Amand, 1st Baron Saint Amand			
29	Robertus filius Pagani, Dns Lammer (Robert son of Payne, Lord of Lammer); Robert FitzPayne; S(IGILLUM) ROBERTI FILII PAGANI (seal of Robert son of Payne) - Robert FitzPayne, 1st Baron FitzPayne			
30	Thomas Dns de Berkele (Thomas Lord Berkeley) – Thomas de Berkeley, 1st Baron Berkeley			
31	Petrus Corbet, Dns de Cauz (Peter Corbet, Lord of Caus) - Peter Corbet, 2nd Baron Corbet; Sigillum Petri Corbet; Seal of Peter Corbet			
32	Henricus de Tyes, Dns de Chilton (Henry de Tyes, Lord of Chilton) - Henry de Teyes, 1st Baron Teyes			
33	Robtus de Tatteshale, Dns de Bukeham (Robert de Tattershall, Lord of Buckenham) - Robert de Tateshall, 2nd Baron Tateshall			
34	Johannes Lovel, Dns de Dacking (John Lovell, Lord of Dacking) - John Lovel, 1st Baron Lovel			
35	Hugo de Vere, Dns Swainschaumpis (Hugh de Vere, Lord of Swanscombe) – Hugh de Vere, 1st Baron Vere, son of Robert de Vere, 5th Earl of Oxford			
36	Robtus la Warde, Dns de Alba Aula (Robert la Warde, Lord of Alba Aula) - Robert de La Ward, 1st Baron De La Ward			
37	Johannes le Estraunge, Dns de Cnokyn (John le Strange, Lord of Knockin) – John le Strange, 1st Baron Strange of Knockyn			
38	Thomas de Multon, Dns de Egremont (Thomas de Multon, Lord of Egremont) – Thomas de Multon, 1st Baron Multon of Egremont			
39	Rogerus de Mortuo Mari, Dns de Penketlyn (Roger de Mortimer, Lord of Pengethly) - Roger Mortimer, 1st Baron Mortimer of Chirk			
40	Robertus de Clifford, Castellanus de Appelby (Robert de Clifford, Lord of Appleby) – Robert Clifford, 1st Baron Clifford			
41	Willus de Cantilopo, Dns de Ravensthorp (William de Cantelupe, Lord of Ravensthorpe) - William de Cantilupe, 1st Baron Cantilupe	Pendant to the Barons' Letter - series B		
42	Brianus filius Alani, Dns de Bedale (Brian son of Alan, Lord of Bedale) – Bryan FitzAlan, Lord FitzAlan			
43	Nicus de Carru, Dns de Mulesford (Nicholas de Carew, Lord of Moulsford) – Nicholas Carew (died 1311)			
44	Johes de Haveringes, Dns de Grafton (John de Havering, Lord of Grafton)			
45	Walterus de Teye, Dns de Standgreve (Walter de Teye, Lord of Standgreve) - Walter de Teye			
46	Walt(er)us de Bello Campo, D(omi)n(u)s de Alcestre ("Walter de Beauchamp, Lord of Alcester") – Walter de Beauchamp (d.1306) of Beauchamp's Court, Alcester in Warwickshire and of Powick in Worcestershire, Steward of the Household to King Edward I. Younger brother of William de Beauchamp, 9th Earl of Warwick. Signed the Letter with his nephew Guy de Beauchamp, 10th Earl of Warwick			
47	Alanus la Zuche, Dns de Assheby (Alan la Zouche, Lord of Ashby) – Alan la Zouche, 1st Baron Zouche of Ashby			
48	Eustachius, Dns de Hacche (Eustace, Lord of Hacche) - Eustace de Hache, 1st Baron Hache			
49	Wills Martyn, Dns de Camesio (William Martin, Lord of Kemeys) - William Martin, 1st Baron Martin			
50	Johannes, Dns de Segrave (John, Lord of Segrave) – John Segrave, 2nd Baron Segrave			
51	Wills de Ferrariis, Dns de Groby (William de Ferrers, Lord of Groby) – William Ferrers, 1st Baron Ferrers of Groby			
52	Robtus de Tonny, Dns de Castro Matill (Robert de Tony, Lord of Castle Maud) - Robert de Toni, 1st Baron Toni			
53	Adam, Dns Welle (Adam, Lord of Well) - Adam de Welles, 1st Baron Welles			
54	Gilbertus Pecche, Dns de Corby (Gilbert Peche, Lord of Corby)			
55	Wills Paynell, Dns de Tracyngton (William Paynell, Lord of Tracyngton) - William Paynel, 1st Baron Paynel			
56	Simon, Dns de Monte Acuto (Simon, Lord Montagu)			
57	Petrus de Malolacu, Dns de Musgreve (Peter de Mauley, Lord of Mulgrave) – Peter de Mauley, 1st Baron Mauley			
58	Ranulphus de Nevill, Dns de Raby (Ranulph de Nevill, Lord of Raby) – Ranulph Neville, 1st Baron Neville (1262–1331)			
59	Radulphus, Dns de Grendon (Ralph, Lord of Grendon) – Ralph de Grendon, 1st Baron Grendon			
60	Johannes de Mohun, Dns de Dunsterre (John de Mohun, Lord of Dunster) - John de Mohun, 1st Baron Mohun			
61	Henricus de Pynkeny, Dns de Wedone (Henry de Pinkney, Lord of Wedone) - Henry de Pinkeney, 1st Baron Pinkeney			
62	Mattheus filius Jonis, Dns de Stokenhame (Matthew son of John, Lord of Stokenhame); Matthew FitzJohn			
63	Thomas, Dns de la Roche (Thomas, Lord of la Roche) - Thomas de la Roche, 1st Baron Roche			
64	Thomas de Chaurces, Dns de Norton (Thomas de Chaworth, Lord of Norton) - Thomas de Chaworth, 1st Baron Chaworth			
65	Robtus de Scales, Dns de Neuseles (Robert de Scales, Lord of Newsells) – Robert Scales, 1st Baron Scales			
66	Thomas de Furnivall, Dns de Shefeold (Thomas de Furnivall, Lord of Sheffield) - Thomas de Furnivall, 1st Baron Furnivall			
67	Bogo de Knovill, Dns de Albomonasterio (Bogo de Knovill, Lord of Albomonasterio) - Bogo de Knovill, 1st Baron Knovill			
68	Fulco le Estraunge, Dns de Corsham (Fulk le Strange, Lord of Corsham) - Fulk le Strange, 1st Baron Strange of Blackmere			
69	Hugo Bardolfe, Dns de Wirmegaye (Hugh Bardolf, Lord of Wormegay) – Hugh Bardolf, 1st Baron Bardolf			
70	Ricardus Talebot, Dns de Eckleswell (Richard Talbot, Lord of Eccleswall) – Richard Talbot			
71	Edmundus de Eyncourt, Dns de Thurgerton (Edmund Deincourt, Lord of Thurgarton) – Edmund Deincourt, 1st Baron Deincourt			
72	Emundus, Baro Stafford (Edmund, Baron Stafford) – Edmund Stafford, 1st Baron Stafford (1272–1308)			
73	Phus, Dns de Kyme (Philip, Lord of Kyme) - Philip de Kyme, 1st Baron Kyme			
74	Jones Pynell, Dns de Otteleye (John Paynel, Lord of Otley) - John Paynel of Otley			
75	Walterus, Dns de Huntercombe (Walter, Lord of Huntercombe) – Walter de Huntercombe			
76	Wills Marescallus, Dns de Hengham (William Marshal, Lord of Hingham) - William Marshal, 1st Baron Marshal			
77	Robertus de Monte Alto, Dns de Harwardyn (Robert Montalt, Lord of Harwardyn) - Robert de Montalt, 1st Baron Montalt			
78	Hugo Poyntz, Dns de Corimalet (Hugh Poyntz, Lord of Curry Mallet) - Hugh Poyntz, 1st Baron Poyntz			
79	Henricus Tregoz, Dns de Garynges (Henry Tregoz, Lord of Goring) - Henry de Tregoz			
80	Wills Touchet, Dns de Leuenhales (William Touchet, Lord of Lewenhales) – William Touchet, 1st Baron Touchet			
81	Johannes, Dns de Kingeston (John, Lord of Kingeston) John de Kingston			
82	Robertus Hastang, Dns de la Desiree (Robert de Hastang, Lord of la Desiree) - Robert Hastang, 1st Baron Hastang			
83	Walterus, Dns de Faucomberge (Walter, Lord of Fauconberg) - Walter de Fauconberg, 1st Baron Fauconberg			
84	Rogerus le Estraunge, Dns de Ellesmere (Roger le Strange, Lord of Ellesmere) - Roger le Strange, Baron Strange			
85	Jones filius Marmeduci, Dns de Hordene (John son of Marmaduke, Lord of Horden) – John FitzMarmaduke			
86	Johannes le Breton, dns de Sporle (John le Breton, Lord of Sporle) - John le Breton (died 1310)			

== See also ==
- Declaration of Arbroath, a declaration of Scottish independence, made in 1320. It is in the form of a letter submitted to Pope John XXII, dated 6 April 1320, intended to confirm Scotland's status as an independent, sovereign state
- Scimus Fili

== Text ==
See the full text on wikisource s:Barons' Letter, 1301 (English); la:s:Baronum epistola, 1301 (Latin).

== Sources ==
- Howard de Walden, Lord, Some Feudal Lords and their Seals 1301, published 1903 reprinted 1984. Latin transcript, English translation & photographic images of seals.
- National Archives catalogue entry, Barons'Letter
- Brian Timms heraldry website
- Rymer, T, Foedera, (Ed.), London, 1727, vol. II, p. 873, Latin transcript
