= John le Breton (died 1310) =

Coat of arms of John le Breton, Lord of Sporle, Quarterly, or and gules, a bordure azure..

John le Breton (Note: Surname also spelt, Briton, Bruton and Bretoun) (died 1310), Lord of Sporle was an English noble. He was a signatory of the Baron's Letter to Pope Boniface VIII in 1301.

== Biography ==
John was a son of William le Breton. He was a signatory of the Baron's Letter to Pope Boniface VIII in 1301. John may have been justice of trailbaston in Norfolk and Suffolk.

He died in 1310 and was succeeded by his son John. His son died shortly afterwards and his daughter Maud succeeded.
