= Matthew FitzJohn =

English noble

Coat of arms of Matthew FitzJohn, Lord of Stokenham, Per pale, azure and gules, three lions or..

Matthew FitzJohn (died 1309), Lord of Stokenham, was an English noble. He was Sheriff of Devon and Governor of Exeter and also a signatory of the Baron's Letter to Pope Boniface VIII in 1301.

== Biography ==
Matthew was son of John FitzMatthew and Margaret de Berkeley. He was Governor of Exeter in 1288, Sheriff of Devon in 1288 and 1294, was warden of the forests of Mellsham and Chippenham, and was a signatory of the Barons' Letter to Pope Boniface VIII in 1301. Matthew married Eleanor. He died in 1309, his lands were left to King Edward II of England.
