= Hugh Bardolf, 1st Baron Bardolf =

English nobleman

Coat of arms of High Bardolf, Lord of Wormegay, Azure, three cinquefoils Or.

Hugh Bardolf, 1st Baron Bardolf (died 1304), Lord of Wormegay was an English noble. He served in the wars in France and Scotland and was a signatory of the Baron's Letter to Pope Boniface VIII in 1301.

== Biography ==
Hugh was a son of William Bardolf and Juliane de Gournay. He served in the wars in France and Scotland and was a signatory of the Baron's Letter to Pope Boniface VIII in 1301.

He died in 1304 and was succeeded by his son Thomas.

== Marriage and issue ==
Hugh married Isabel, daughter of Robert d'Aguillon and Joan de Ferrers, they had the following issue:

- Thomas Bardolf, married Agnes Grandison and had issue.
- William Bardolf
- Nichole Bardolf, married firstly Robert de Arderne and secondly Thomas Wale. Had issue from both marriages.
- Margery Bardolf, married Michael de Poynings and had issue.
