= John de Hodleston =

English noble (died 1306)

Coat of arms of Hodleston, Lord of Aneys, Gules, fretty Argent..

John de Hodleston (died 1306), Lord of Aneys was an English noble. He fought in the wars in Wales and Scotland. He was appointed during his life to serve as Warden of Galloway and was a signatory of the Baron's Letter to Pope Boniface VIII in 1301.

== Biography ==
John was the eldest son of John de Hodleston and Joan de Boyvil. He was made Warden of Galloway on 22 August 1297, with control of the castles of Buittle, Wigton, Cruggleton and Ayr. He signed and appended his seal to the Baron's Letter to Pope Boniface VIII in 1301. He was captain of Cumberland and Westmoreland in 1303.

== Marriage and issue ==
John married Sybil de Cornwall and had the following issue:

- John
- Richard
