= Robert Hastang, 1st Baron Hastang =

Coat of arms of Robert Hastang, Lord of La Desiree, Azure, a chief gules, over all a lion rampant fourchéee or, overall a barrulet in chief argent.

Robert Hastang, 1st Baron Hastang (died 1304), Lord of La Desiree, Badenhall, Chebsey and Leamington Hastang was an English noble. He fought in the wars in Scotland. He was a signatory of the Baron's Letter to Pope Boniface VIII in 1301.

== Biography ==
Robert was the eldest son of Robert de Hastang and Joane de Curli. He served in the wars in Scotland, was the Constable of Roxburgh Castle and was a signatory of the Baron's Letter to Pope Boniface VIII in 1301. His brother Richard was Constable of Jedburgh Castle.

He died in 1304 and was succeeded by his eldest son Robert.

== Marriage and issue ==
Robert had the following issue, by his first wife, whose name is currently unknown:

- Robert Hastang
- John Hastang

He married secondly, Isabel, widow of John FitzAlan, and was the daughter of Roger de Mortimer of Wigmore.
