= Bogo de Knovill, 1st Baron Knovill =

English noble (died 1307)

Coat of arms of Bogo de Knovill, Lord of Albomonasterio in 1301, Argent, three spur rowells Gules, a label of three Azure.

Bogo de Knovill, 1st Baron Knovill (died 1307), Lord of Albomonasterio was an English noble. He served as sheriff of Shropshire and Staffordshire, also serving in the wars in Wales and Scotland and was a signatory of the Baron's Letter to Pope Boniface VIII in 1301.

== Biography ==
Bogo was a son of Bogo de Knovill. He served as Justiciar of West Wales, sheriff of Shropshire and Staffordshire, in the wars in Scotland and was a signatory of the Baron's Letter to Pope Boniface VIII in 1301.

He died in 1307 and was succeeded by his son Bogo.

== Marriage and issue ==
Bogo married firstly Joan, whose parentage is currently unknown, they had the following issue:

- Bogo de Knovill, married another Joan, had issue
- Elizabeth de Knovill, married Thomas Mauduit, had issue.
- Margaret de Knovill, married Thomas de Verdon, had issue.

He married secondly, Alianore, widow of Robert Lestrange, she was the daughter of William de Blancminster.
