= William Touchet, 1st Baron Touchet =

English nobleman

William Touchet, 1st Baron Touchet (died 1308), Lord of Lewenhales was an English noble. He fought in the wars in Scotland and Gascony. He was a signatory of the Baron's Letter to Pope Boniface VIII in 1301.

== Biography ==
He was summoned by writ to parliament from 29 December 1299. William served in the wars in Scotland.and Gascony. He was a signatory of the Baron's Letter to Pope Boniface VIII in 1301. William was married to Maria. He died in 1308.
