= John Paynel, 2nd Baron Paynel =

Arms of John Paynel of Otley: Vert, a maunch or.

John Paynel, 2nd Baron Paynel (Note: Surname also spelt Paganel or Paynell) (died 1319), Lord of Otley, was an English noble. He fought in the wars in Scotland. He was a signatory of the Baron's Letter to Pope Boniface VIII in 1301.

== Biography ==
John was the youngest son of William Paynel and Maud Husse. He served in Scotland between 1299 until 1316. He was a signatory of the Baron's Letter to Pope Boniface VIII in 1301, together with his brother William.

He succeeded his elder brother William in 1317. inheriting lands in Okhangre, Wedeford, Burhonte, Butrlee and Westworldham.

William married, Iseult, the daughter of Stephen de Boughton. He died in 1319 and was succeeded by his daughter Maud, with some lands held in dower of Eva, the wife of Edward St. John, the former wife of his brother William. Maud was married to Nicholas de Upton.
