= John Rivers, 1st Baron Rivers =

English noble

Coat of arms of John Rivers, Lord of Aungre Lozengy, or and gules.

John Rivers, 1st Baron Rivers (Note: Also known as John de Riparis) (died 1311), Lord of Aungre was an English noble. He served in English campaigns in Gascony and Scotland. He was a signatory of the Baron's Letter to Pope Boniface VIII in 1301.

== Biography ==
John was the son of John de Rivers. He served in the wars in Gascony and Scotland. He fought at the Battle of Falkirk in 1298 and the Siege of Caerlaverock in 1301, and was summoned to parliament by writ of summons on 6 February 1299. He was a signatory of the Baron's Letter to Pope Boniface VIII in 1301. He was succeeded by his son John, by his widow Ellen.
