= Robert de La Ward, 1st Baron De La Ward =

13th-14th century English noble

Coat of arms of Robert de La Warde, Lord of Alba Aula, Vairy, Argent and Sable..

Robert de La Warde, 1st Baron De La Ward (died 1306), Lord of Alba Aula, Burton Overy and Upton, and Newhall was an English noble. He fought in the wars in Gascony, Flanders and Scotland. He was a signatory of the Baron's Letter to Pope Boniface VIII in 1301.

== Biography ==
Robert served in Gascony in 1295, Flanders in 1297 and in Scotland and took part in the battle of Falkirk on 22 July 1298, and was present at the siege of Carlaverock in July 1300. Robert was active in the wars in Scotland in 1303 to 1306. He was appointed Steward of the Royal Household in 1302.

Robert died in 1306 and was succeeded by his son Simon. Simon died without issue and his co-heirs were his sisters.

== Marriages and issue ==
Robert married three times.

By his first wife, he had a daughter Joan, who married Hugh Meynell, and had issue.

His second wife, who had a daughter Margaret, who married John de Neville, had her marriage annulled. Margaret married Thomas Staple, and lastly to John Chanceus.

Ida, his third wife, daughter of Robert Fitzwalter and Alianore de Ferrers, who was pregnant when her husband died, a son Simon de La Warde. Simon died without issue.
