= Robert de Tateshall, 2nd Baron Tateshall =

Coat of arms of Robert de Tateshall, Lord of Buckenham, Chequey Or and Gules, a chief Ermine..

Robert de Tateshall, 2nd Baron Tateshall (died 1303), Lord of Tateshall, Buckenham and Cratfield was an English noble. He fought in the wars in Scotland. He was a signatory of the Baron's Letter to Pope Boniface VIII in 1301.

== Biography ==
Robert was a son of Robert de Tateshall and Joan filia Randolph. He served in Scotland and took part in the battle of Falkirk on 22 July 1298, and was present at the siege of Carlaverock in July 1300. Robert married Eve, daughter of Robert de Tibetot and Eve Chaworth.

Tateshall died in 1303 and was succeeded by his son Robert. His only son died in 1306, in minority without issue leaving his aunts, the sisters of his father, as co-heirs: Emma, Joan and Isabel.
