= Hugh Poyntz, 1st Baron Poyntz =

English noble

Coat of arms of Hugh Poyntz, Lord of Curry Mallet, Barry of eight or and gules.. (Note: These were the same arms borne by Bryan FitzAlan, Lord FitzAlan. Poyntz, won exclusive right to them, as is related in the Caerlaverock Roll.)

Hugh Poyntz, 1st Baron Poyntz (died 1307), Lord of Curry Mallet was an English noble. He fought in the wars in Wales, Gascony and Scotland. He was a signatory of the Baron's Letter to Pope Boniface VIII in 1301.

== Biography ==
Hugh was the eldest son of Nicholas Poyntz and Isabel Dyall. He served in the wars in Wales, Gascony, Scotland and was a signatory of the Baron's Letter to Pope Boniface VIII in 1301.

He died in 1307 and was succeeded by his eldest son Nicholas.

== Marriage and issue ==
Hugh married Margaret, daughter of William Paveley, they had the following issue:

- Nicholas Poyntz, married firstly Elizabeth la Zouche and secondly married Maud de Acton, had issue from both marriages.
