= Eustace de Hache, 1st Baron Hache =

Coat of arms of Eustace de Hache, Lord of Hache, Or, a cross engrailed Gules..

Eustace de Hache (died 1306), Lord of Hache was an English noble. He fought in the wars in Scotland. He was a signatory of the Baron's Letter to Pope Boniface VIII in 1301.

== Biography ==
Eustace's parentage is not currently known. He fought at the battle of Falkirk on 22 July 1298 and was present at the siege of Carlaverock in July 1300. He was a signatory of the Baron's Letter to Pope Boniface VIII in 1301. Eustace married Amice, daughter of John de Lew and Amice. He died in 1306, his daughter Juliana was his heir.
