= Baron FitzReginald =

Extinct barony in the Peerage of England

Baron FitzReginald was a title in the Peerage of England. It existed as a feudal barony by tenure, before being created by Writ of summons to Parliament of John FitzReginald in 1294 until his death in 1310, when the title became extinct.

== Feudal barony by tenure ==
- Herbert FitzHerbert
- Herbert FitzHerbert, son and heir
- Peter FitzHerbert, son and heir, died 1235.
- Herbert Fitz-Peter, son and heir, died 1248.
- Reginald FitzPiers, brother and heir, died 1286.

== Baron FitzReginald (1294) ==
- John FitzReginald, summoned to parliament on 8 June 1294 until 26 January 1297. He was summoned again on 29 December 1299 until 26 August 1307. He died in 1310 and the title became extinct.
