= Henry de Teyes, 1st Baron Teyes =

Coat of arms of Henry de Teyes, Lord of Chilton, Argent, a chevron Gules..

Henry de Teyes, 1st Baron Teyes (died 1307), Lord of Chilton was an English noble. He fought in the wars in Wales, Flanders and Scotland. He was a signatory of the Baron's Letter to Pope Boniface VIII in 1301.

== Biography ==
Henry was the eldest son of Henry de Teyes and Joan de Foliot. He served in Wales in 1287 and 1292, Flanders in 1297 and in Scotland between 1299 until 1306. Henry took part in the battle of Falkirk on 22 July 1298, and was present at the siege of Carlaverock in July 1300, He was a signatory of the Baron's Letter to Pope Boniface VIII in 1301.

He died in 1307 and was succeeded by his eldest son Henry.

== Marriage and issue ==
Henry married Hawise, daughter of Simon de Montagu and Hawise de St. Amand, they had the following issue:

- Henry de Teyes (executed 3 April 1322), married Margaret, without issue.
- Alice de Teyes, married Warin de Lisle, had issue.
