= Robert de Toni, 1st Baron Toni =

Coat of arms of Robert de Toni, Lord of Flamsted, Argent, a maunch gules..

Robert de Toni, 1st Baron Toni (Note: Also known as Robert de Toeni, Robert de Tosny or Robert de Tony.) (died 1309), Lord of Flamstead, Kirtling, and Maud Castle was an English noble. He fought in the wars in Gascony and Scotland. He was a signatory of the Baron's Letter to Pope Boniface VIII in 1301.

== Biography ==
Robert was a son of Ralph de Toni and Mary de Brus. He took part in the battle of Falkirk on 22 July 1298, and was present at the siege of Carlaverock in July 1300. He was a signatory of the Baron's Letter to Pope Boniface VIII in 1301. Robert married Maud, the daughter of Malise III, Earl of Strathearn and Agnes de Comyn.

He died in 1309 and his heir was his sister Alice.
