= Baron Vavasour =

Baron Vavasour is an abeyant title in the Peerage of England. It was created in 1299 by writ of summons for William le Vavasour, who fought alongside Edward I at the Battle of Falkirk. The third baron was never called to Parliament, nor were any of his successors and the title became abeyant on the death of the de jure 25th baron in 1826. The de jure 19th Baron was granted the title of baronet, which became extinct at the same time as the barony's abeyance.

== Barons Vavasour (1299) ==
- William le Vavasour, 1st Baron Vavasour (c.1265–1312/3)
- Walter le Vavasour, 2nd Baron Vavasour (c.1280–1315)
- Robert le Vavasour, de jure 3rd Baron Vavasour (d. 1322)
- Henry le Vavasour, de jure 4th Baron Vavasour (c.1290–1342)
- Henry le Vavasour, de jure 5th Baron Vavasour (d. 1349)
- Henry le Vavasour, de jure 6th Baron Vavasour (1328/9–1355)
- William Vavasour, de jure 7th Baron Vavasour (1334–1369)
- William Vavasour, de jure 8th Baron Vavasour (c.1358–1386/7)
- Henry Vavasour, de jure 9th Baron Vavasour (d. 1413)
- Henry Vavasour, de jure 10th Baron Vavasour (c.1402–1452/3)
- Henry Vavasour, de jure 11th Baron Vavasour (d. 1499)
- William Vavasour, de jure 12th Baron Vavasour (d. 1500)
- Henry Vavasour, de jure 13th Baron Vavasour (c.1456–1515)
- John Vavasour, de jure 14th Baron Vavasour (d. 1524)
- William Vavasour, de jure 15th Baron Vavasour (1514–1566)
- John Vavasour, de jure 16th Baron Vavasour (1538–1609)
- Ralph Vavasour, de jure 17th Baron Vavasour (d. 1611)
- William Vavasour, de jure 18th Baron Vavasour (1569–1626)
- Sir Thomas Vavasour, 1st Baronet, de jure 19th Baron Vavasour (d. 1635/6)
- Sir Walter Vavasour, 2nd Baronet, de jure 20th Baron Vavasour (c.1612–1666)
- Sir Walter Vavasour, 3rd Baronet, de jure 21st Baron Vavasour (c.1644–1712/3)
- Sir Walter Vavasour, 4th Baronet, de jure 22nd Baron Vavasour (c.1659–1740)
- Sir Walter Vavasour, 5th Baronet, de jure 23rd Baron Vavasour (d. 1766)
- Sir Walter Vavasour, 6th Baronet, de jure 24th Baron Vavasour (1744–1802)
- Sir Thomas Vavasour, 7th Baronet, de jure 25th Baron Vavasour (c.1745–1826)

== See also ==
- Vavasour baronets
- Vavasour family
