= Peter de Mauley, 1st Baron Mauley =

13–14th century English noble

Coat of arms of Peter de Mauley, Lord of Mulgrave, Or, a bend Sable.

Peter de Mauley, 1st Baron Mauley (died 1309), Lord of Mulgrave was an English noble. He served in the wars in Wales, Gascony and Scotland and was a signatory of the Baron's Letter to Pope Boniface VIII in 1301.

== Biography ==
Peter was the eldest son of Peter de Mauley and Nichola de Gant. He served in the wars in Wales, Gascony and Scotland and was a signatory of the Baron's Letter to Pope Boniface VIII in 1301.

He died in 1309 and was succeeded by his son Peter.

== Marriage and issue ==
Peter married Eleanor, daughter of Thomas de Furnivall, they had the following issue:

- Peter de Mauley, married Margaret de Clifford, had issue.
