= Wormegay Castle =

British castle

- Norfolk, England
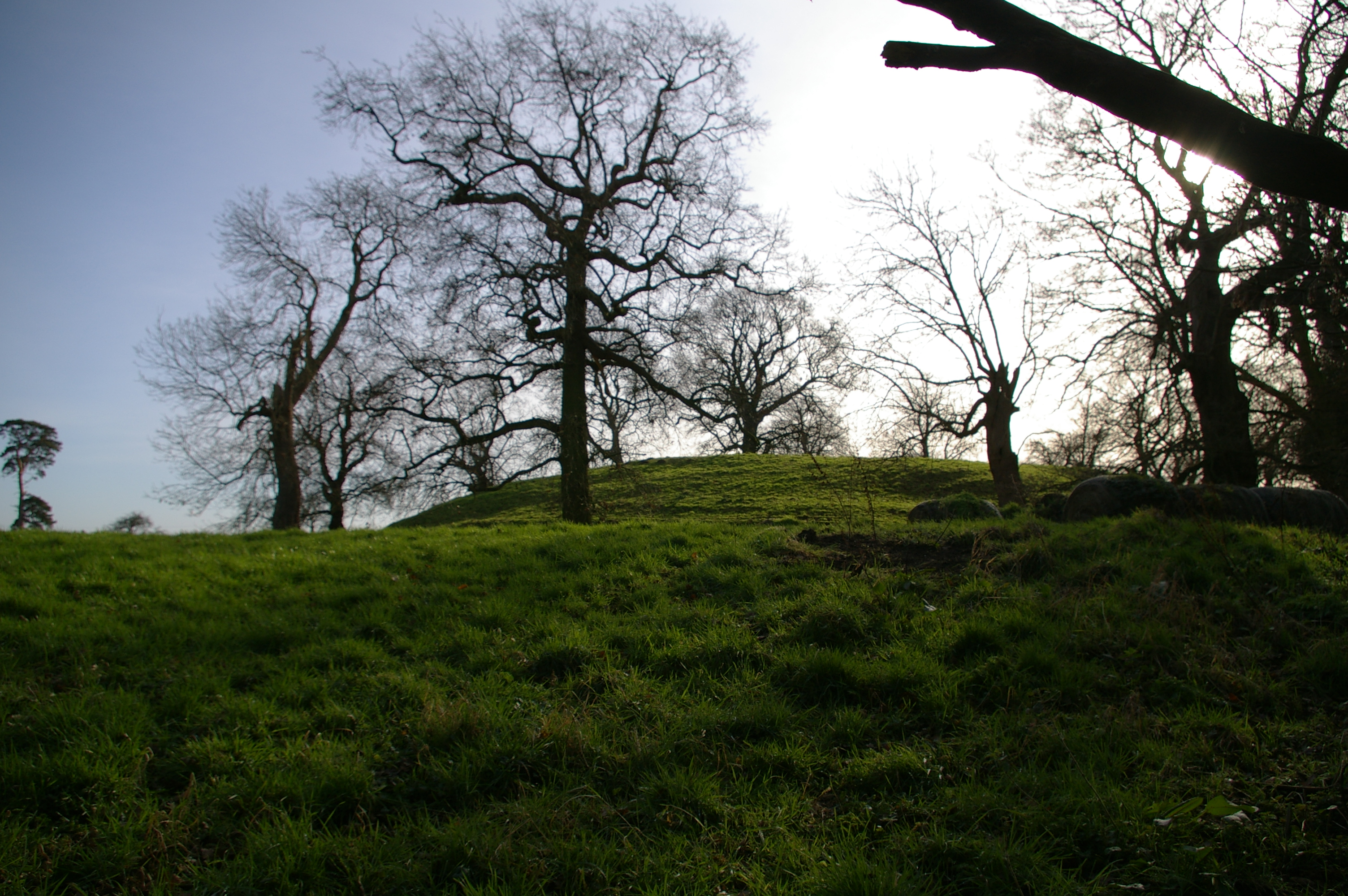
- Motte of Wormegay Castle

Site information
- Type: Motte-and-bailey

Location
- Shown within Norfolk
- Coordinates: 52.6779°N 0.4522°E
- Grid reference: grid reference TF65931173

Wormegay Castle is a motte and bailey earthwork, located next to the village of Wormegay in the English county of Norfolk.

== Details ==
The castle was probably built by Hermer de Ferrers after the Norman Conquest, and remained in the de Ferrers family until 1166. The motte is 5 metres high and 77 metres by 62 metres wide at the base. The motte is surrounded on three sides by a ditch up to 15 metres wide and 2 metres deep. The bailey is 150 metres by 88 metres across, and raised about 1 metre from the ground. The castle would have been highly visible in early medieval times, more so than in the 21st century, and would have formed a local landmark as well as controlling the local causeway across the Fens. Wormegay formed the centre, or the caput, for an honour of feudal properties across East Anglia. As the centre of a major estate, Wormegay provided castle-guard duties to Norwich Castle.

== See also ==
- Castles in Great Britain and Ireland
- List of castles in England

== Bibliography ==
- Liddiard, Robert. (2000) Landscapes of lordship: Norman castles and the countryside in medieval Norfolk, 1066-1200. Archaeopress. ISBN 978-1-84171-156-0.
- Pounds, Norman John Greville. (1994) The Medieval Castle in England and Wales: a social and political history. Cambridge: Cambridge University Press. ISBN 978-0-521-45828-3.
