= William de Rithre, 1st Baron Rithre =

English noble

Coat of arms of William de Rithre, Lord of Rithre, Azure, three crescents or.

William de Rithre, 1st Baron Rithre (Note: Surname also spelt as Ryther, Rythre, Rither or Ridre), Lord of Rithre was an English noble. He fought in the wars in Gascony and Scotland.

== Biography ==
William was summoned to parliament by writ between 29 December 1299 and 26 August 1307. He took part in expeditions in Gascony and Scotland. He was succeeded by his son John.
