= John de Montfort, 2nd Baron Montfort =

13th-14th century English nobleman

Arms of Baron Montfort: Bendy of ten, or and azure.

John de Montfort (died 24 June 1314), was an English noble. He was slain during the Battle of Bannockburn, Scotland in 1314.

William was the eldest son of John de Montfort and Alice de Plunch. He was killed fighting the Scots during the Battle of Bannockburn on 24 June 1314. He was succeeded by his younger brother Peter.

== Citations ==
Peerage of England
Preceded by John de Montfort	Baron Montfort; 1296–1314	Succeeded by Peter de Montfort
