= William Paynel, 1st Baron Paynel =

English nobleman

Coat of arms of William Paynel, Lord of Trotton, Argent, two bars Sable, an orle of 8 marlets Gules..

William Paynel, 1st Baron Paynel (Note: Surname also spelt Paganel or Paynell) (died 1317), Lord of Trotton, Littleton, Knighton Paynel and Woolbedding, was an English noble. He fought in the wars in Flanders and Scotland. He was a signatory of the Baron's Letter to Pope Boniface VIII in 1301.

== Biography ==
William was the second son of William Paynel and Maud Husse. He served in Flanders in 1297 and in Scotland between 1299 until 1316. He was a signatory of the Baron's Letter to Pope Boniface VIII in 1301, together with his brother John.

He succeeded his elder brother Thomas in 1313. Inheriting lands in Okhangre, Wedeford, Burhonte, Butrlee and Westworldham.

He married firstly, Margaret, widow of John de Camoys, she was the daughter of John de Gatesden. His second wife was Eve, widow of Roger de Shelvestrode, the daughter of John de Dawtry. William died in 1317 without issue. Eva later remarried Edward St John. William was succeeded by his brother John.
