= Richard Basset, 1st Baron Basset of Weldon =

13th-14th century English nobleman

Arms of Basset of Weldon: Paly of six or and gules, within a bordure azure bezantee.

Richard Basset, 1st Baron Basset (died 1314), Lord of Weldon, was an English noble.

Richard was a son of Ralph Basset and Eleanor de la Wade. He was summoned to Parliament between 1299 and 1314. Richard was captured during the Battle of Bannockburn, Scotland on 24 June 1314. He later died in captivity.
