= Almaric de St Amand, 1st Baron Saint Amand =

13th-14th century English noble

Coat of arms of Almaric de St. Amand, Lord of Widehaye, Or, fretty Sable, on a chief of the second, three besants.

Almaric de St. Amand (born 1268 or 1269; died 1310), also known as Amauri de St Amand, Lord of Widehaye was an English noble. He fought in the wars in Gascony and Scotland. He was a signatory of the Baron's Letter to Pope Boniface VIII in 1301.

== Biography ==
Almaric, born in 1268 or 1269, was the second son of Almaric de St. Amand. He succeeded his elder brother after Guy died not long after their father. Almaric served in Gascony in 1294, and in Scotland during 1300 and 1306. The title Baron St Amand was created for him in 1299 but became extinct when he died without issue. He was at the Siege of Carlaverock Castle in 1300 when his arms were recorded in verse in the Caerlaverock Roll as follows:

Aumary de Saint Amand,
who claims a place among the bold,
Or and fretty sable carried,
On a chief three roundels gold.

He was summoned to Parliament in 1300 and signed the Barons' Letter to the pope, on 12 February 1301. He died in 1310, without issue and was succeeded by his brother John.
