= Thomas de Chaworth, 1st Baron Chaworth =

Coat of arms of Thomas de Chaworth, Lord of Alfreton, Azure, two chevrons Or..

Thomas de Chaworth, 1st Baron Chaworth (Note: Surname was also recorded as Chawurcis, Chaurcis and Chaurces) (died 1315), Lord of Norton and Alfreton was an English noble. He was a signatory of the Baron's Letter to Pope Boniface VIII in 1301.

== Biography ==
Thomas was the eldest son of William de Chaworth and Alicia de Alfreton. He was a signatory of the Baron's Letter to Pope Boniface VIII in 1301.

He died in 1315, his son William succeeded him.

== Marriage and issue ==
Henry married Joan, whose parentage is currently unknown, they had the following issue:

- William de Chaworth
- Thomas de Chaworth
