= Baron Thweng =

Baron Thweng (Tweng, Thwinge etc.) is an abeyant title in the Peerage of England created on 22 February 1307 for Sir Marmaduke Thweng, a famous knight who took part in the First War of Scottish Independence. The title became abeyant upon the death of his third son Thomas Thweng, 4th Baron Thweng in 1374.

== Lords Thweng ==
- Marmaduke Thweng, 1st Baron Thweng
- William Thweng, 2nd Baron Thweng
- Robert Thweng, 3rd Baron Thweng
- Thomas Thweng, 4th Baron Thweng (died 28 May 1374)
