= Baron Darcy of Nocton =

Baron Darcy of Nocton is an abeyant title in the Peerage of England. On 29 December 1299 Philip Darcy was summoned to parliament. On the death of the third baron around 1350, the barony fell into abeyance.

== Barons Darcy of Nocton (1299) ==
- Philip Darcy, 1st Baron Darcy of Nocton (1258–1332)
- Norman Darcy, 2nd Baron Darcy of Nocton (d. 1340)
- Philip Darcy, 3rd Baron Darcy of Nocton (d. c.1350) (abeyant c. 1350)
