= Thomas de la Roche, 1st Baron Roche =

Coat of arms of Thomas de la Roche, Lord of La Roche, Sable, three roaches naiant in pale argent..

Thomas de la Roche, 1st Baron Roche, Lord of La Roche was an English noble. He fought in the wars in Scotland. He was a signatory of the Baron's Letter to Pope Boniface VIII in 1301.

== Biography ==
Thomas was a son of John de la Roche and Maud de Walys. He took part in the wars in Scotland and was a signatory of the Baron's Letter to Pope Boniface VIII in 1301.

== Marriage and issue ==
He had the following issue:

- John de la Roche, died without issue.
- William de la Roche, married Maud de Grey, had issue
- Lucia de la Roche, married William le Valance, had issue.
- Joanna de la Roche, married David de la Roche, had issue.
- Margaret de la Roche, married Simon Fleming, had issue.
- Alicia de la Roche, married Thomas Arcedekne, had issue.
