= John Engaine, 1st Baron Engaine =

13th-14th century English nobleman

John Engaine (died 1322), Lord of Laxton, was an English noble.

== Life ==
John was a son of John Engaine and Joan Greinville. He accompanied Edward I of England to France in 1286, was at the Battle of Falkirk in 1298 and the Siege of Caerlaverock in 1300. He married Ellen de Clavering daughter of Robert fitzRoger and Margaret de la Zouch. John died in 1322 without issue.
