= Hugh de Vere, 1st Baron Vere =

14th century English nobleman

Arms of Hugh de Vere: Quarterly gules and or, in the first quarter a mullet argent, within a bordure engrailed sable.

Hugh de Vere, Lord of Swanscombe, was an English nobleman who fought during the Hundred Years' War.

== Biography ==
Hugh was the second son of Robert de Vere, 5th Earl of Oxford and Alice de Sanford. He was married to Denise, daughter of William de Munchensy. Vere served in Gascony (1294–1297) and in Scotland (1299–1318).

As Captain of Saint-Sever, Gascony, he withstood a siege of about 13 weeks in 1295, by a French army led by Charles of Valois. Hugh was forced to capitulate due to running out of food.

Vere was summoned to Parliament as Baron Vere on 27 September 1299.

In 1300, Hugh was part of the English army that laid siege to and captured Caerlaverock Castle in Scotland.

At his death in 1318, the barony become extinct.

== Citations ==
Peerage of England
New creation	Baron Vere; 1299–1318	Extinct
