= Adam de Everingham, 1st Baron Everingham =

13th–14th century English noble

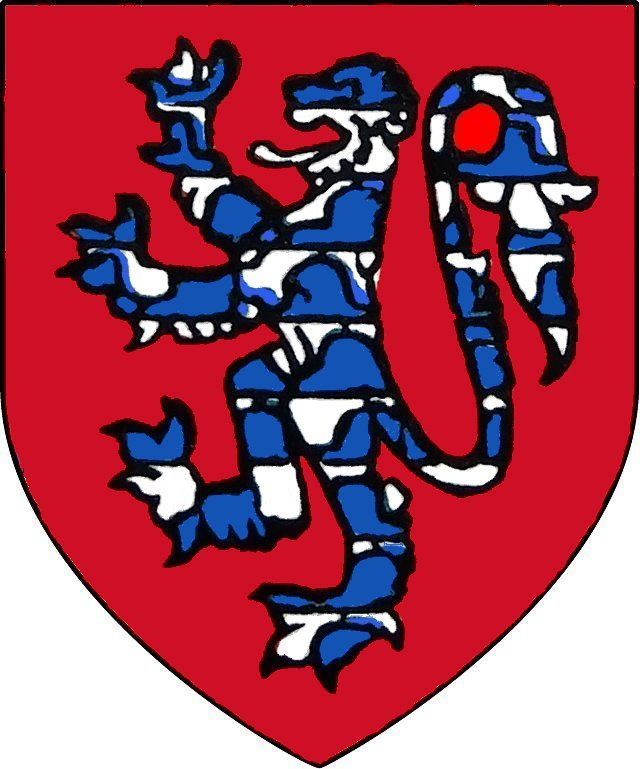
Arms of Baron Everingham:- Gules, a lion rampant vair.

Sir Adam de Everingham, 1st Baron Everingham (died 1341), Lord of Laxton, was an English noble.

== Life ==
Adam was the eldest son of Robert de Everingham and Alice de la Hyde. He was involved in the wars against Scotland from 1303 and later supported Thomas, Earl of Lancaster as part of the baronial opposition to Edward II. Adam became a prisoner after the defeat of the barons at the Battle of Boroughbridge on 16 March 1322. He died in 1341 and is buried in Laxton Church. The effigy of Adam and his two wives are located in the church.

== Marriage and issue ==
Adam married firstly Clarice de La Warre, and secondly to Margaret the widow of John d’Eville. He is known to have had the following known issue:

- Adam de Everingham, married Joan d'Eyvill, had issue.
- Robert de Everingham
- Edmund de Everingham
- Alexander de Everingham
- Nicholas de Everingham
- Margaret de Everingham, married Sir John Standish.
