= Peter Corbet, 2nd Baron Corbet =

14th-century English noble

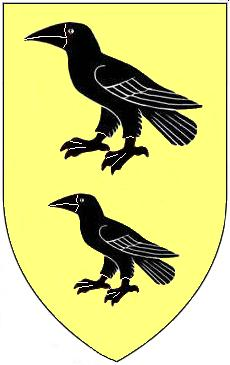
Coat of arms of Peter Corbett, Lord of Caus, Or, two ravens Sable..

Peter Corbett, 2nd Baron Corbet (died 1322), Lord of Caus, was an English noble. He fought in the wars in Scotland. He was a signatory of the Baron's Letter to Pope Boniface VIII in 1301.

== Biography ==
Peter was the second son of Peter Corbet of Caus and Joan de Mortimer. He succeeded to his father's estates after his elder brother Thomas having died without issue during the lifetime of their father.

He served in Scotland during 1300. He was summoned to parliament in 1300 and signed the barons' letter to the pope, on 12 February 1301. Peter married Beatrice, daughter of John de Beauchamp and Cecily de Vivonne. He died in 1322, without issue and was succeeded by his half brother John. His wife died in 1347.

== Bibliography ==
- Burke, John (1836). A genealogical and heraldic history of the commoners of Great Britain and Ireland, enjoying territorial possessions or high official rank; but uninvested with heritable honors. Vol. III. London: R. Bentley.
