= Edmund Deincourt, 1st Baron Deincourt =

Coat of arms of Edmund Deincourt, Lord of Thurgarton, Azure, billeté and a fess dancettée Or.

Edmund Deincourt, 1st Baron Deincourt (died 1327), Lord of Thurgarton, Blankney and Branston was an English noble. He served in the wars in France and Scotland and was a signatory of the Baron's Letter to Pope Boniface VIII in 1301.

== Biography ==
Edmund was the eldest son of John Deincourt and Agnes Neville. He served in the wars in France and Scotland. He was a signatory of the Baron's Letter to Pope Boniface VIII in 1301.

He died in 1327 and was succeeded by his grandson William, the second son of Edmund's eldest son John.

== Marriage and issue ==
Edmund married Isobel, daughter of Reynold de Mohun and Isobel Ferrers, and they had the following issues:

- John Deincourt, who died before his father and had issue.
- William Deincourt, died 23 June 1314, at the siege of Stirling.
- Margaret Deincourt, married Robert de Willoughby and had issue.
