= John de Sudeley, 1st Baron Sudeley =

English baron (c.1258–1336)

Coat of arms of Baron Sudeley of Sudeley, Or, two bends Gules.

John de Sudeley (died 1336), Lord of Sudeley was an English noble. He fought in the wars in France and Scotland. He was appointed during his life to serve as Lord Chamberlain and was a signatory of the Baron's Letter to Pope Boniface VIII in 1301.

== Biography ==
John was the eldest son of Bartholomew de Sudeley and Joan de Beauchamp. He was summoned to Carlisle in 1298 and he signed the Baron's letter to Pope Boniface VIII in 1301. He died in 1336 and was succeeded by his grandson John de Sudeley.

== Marriage and issue ==
John married a daughter of William de Say and Sibyl Marshal and had the following issue:

- Bartholomew de Sudeley (died 1326), married Maud, daughter of John de Montfort, 1st Baron Montfort and Alice de la Plaunche, had issue.
