= Thomas Latimer, 1st Baron Latimer =

English noble

Coat of arms of Thomas Latimer, Lord of Braybrooke, Gules, a cross patonce or, a label of three sable

Thomas le Latimer (died 1334), Lord of Braybrooke was an English noble. He served in English campaigns in France and Scotland.

== Biography ==
Thomas was the only son of John le Latimer and Christiana Ledet. He was summoned to parliament by writ of summons on 29 December 1299, obtained a license to crenelate his manor house in 1304. He attended the coronation of Edward II of England in 1307. Thomas traveled to Scotland to negotiate the release of William Latimer, who had been captured at the Battle of Bannockburn in 1314.

== Marriage and issue ==
Thomas married Lora, daughter of Henry de Hastings and Joan de Cantilupe, they had the following issue:

- Warin Latimer (died 1349), married Catherine de le Warre, had issue.
- Katherine Latimer, married John de Roos, had issue.
