= Henry de Tregoz, 2nd Baron Tregoz =

Coat of arms of Henry de Tregoz, Lord of Goring, Azure, two bars gemelles, and in chief, a lion passant guardamt Or.

Henry de Tregoz, 2nd Baron Tregoz, Lord of Goring was an English noble. He served in the wars in Scotland and was a signatory of the Baron's Letter to Pope Boniface VIII in 1301.

== Biography ==
Henry was the eldest son of Henry de Tregoz and Margaret Goring. He served in the wars in Scotland and was known as a distinguished soldier. He was a signatory of the Baron's Letter to Pope Boniface VIII in 1301. His uncle was John Tregoz of Ewyas Harold.

Tregoz was summoned to attend Edward II of England's coronation.

He died without issue and was succeeded by his brother Thomas.
