= Philip de Kyme, 1st Baron Kyme =

English noble (died 1323)

Coat of arms of Philip de Kyme, Lord of Kyme, Gules, crusily and a chevron Or.

Philip de Kyme, 1st Baron Kyme (died 1323), Lord of Kyme, was an English noble. He served in the wars in Wales, Gascony and Scotland and was a signatory of the Baron's Letter to Pope Boniface VIII in 1301.

== Biography ==
Philip was the eldest son of William de Kyme and Lucy de Ros. He served in the wars in Wales, Gascony and Scotland. He was a signatory of the Baron's Letter to Pope Boniface VIII in 1301.

He died in 1323 and was succeeded by his son William.

== Marriage and issue ==
Philip married Joan, daughter of Hugh Bigod, and Joan de Stuteville, they had the following issue:

- William de Kyme, married Eleanor Mortimer, had issue.
- Lucy de Kyme, married Robert de Umfreville, had issue.
- Agnes de Kyme
