= Alan de Plugenet, 2nd Baron Plugenet =

English noble

Coat of arms of Alan de Plugenet, Lord of Preston Plugenet, Ermine, a bend engrailed gules.

Alan de Plugenet, 2nd Baron Plugenet (died 1319), Lord of Preston Plucknett was an English noble. He served in English campaigns in Scotland.

== Biography ==
Alan was the son of Alen de Plugenet and Joan. He served in Scotland in 1300, 1301 and 1303, and was knighted in 1306. He again served in the Scottish wars from 1309 to 1311, from 1313 to 1317, and in 1319. Alan was summoned to parliament in 1311. Plugenet died in 1319, and was buried at Dore Abbey. He left no issue by his wife Sybil, who in 1327 remarried Henry de Pembridge. She died in 1353. His sister Joan was his heir.
