= William le Vavasour, 1st Baron Vavasour =

13th-14th century English nobleman

Arms of William le Vavasour: Or, a fess dancetty sable.

William le Vavasour (died 1311), Lord of Hazelwood, was an English noble.

William was the eldest son of John le Vavasour and Alice Cockfield. He was active in the wars in Gascony and Scotland. He died in 1311 and was buried in the chapel of St. Leonard, Hazelwood.

== Marriage and issue ==
He married Nicholea, daughter of Stephen Walleys, they are known to have had the following known issue:

- William Vavasour
- Robert Vavasour
- Henry Vavasour
