= Ralph de Grendon, 1st Baron Grendon =

English noble

Coat of arms of Ralph de Grendon, Lord of Grendon: Argent, two chevrons Gules.

Ralph de Grendon, 1st Baron Grendon (died 1331), Lord of Grendon, was an English nobleman. He served in the wars in Scotland and was a signatory of the Barons' Letter of 1301 to Pope Boniface VIII in 1301.

== Biography ==
Ralph was the younger son of Robert de Grendon and Emma Bassatt. He served in the wars in Scotland and was a signatory of the Barons' Letter to Pope Boniface VIII in 1301.

He died in 1331 and was succeeded by his son, Robert.

== Marriage and issue ==
Ralph first married Joan Burnell, daughter of Hugh Burnell. They had the following issue:

- Robert de Grendon, who died without issue.

He married, secondly, Joan, daughter of John de Clinton. They had the following issue:

- Joan de Grendon, who married Roger de Chetwynd.
- Alice de Grendon, who married Philip de Chetwynd.
- Margaret de Grendon, who married John de Freford.
