= John de Somery, 1st Baron Somery =

English noble

Coat of arms of John de Somery, Lord of Dudley, Or, two lions passant azure.

John de Somery, 1st Baron Somery (died 1322), Lord of Dudley was an English noble. He fought in the wars in Scotland.

== Biography ==
John was the son of Roger de Somery and Agnes. He was summoned to parliament by writ between 10 March 1308 and 14 March 1322. He took part in expeditions in Scotland. He married Lucy and died without issue. His heirs were his sisters Margaret and Joan. Margaret was married to John de Sutton and Joan married to Thomas de Botetourt.
