= Baron Mortimer of Wigmore =

Barony in the Peerage of England

The title Baron Mortimer of Wigmore was created twice in the Peerage of England.

The first time, Edmund Mortimer was summoned to parliament on 23 June 1295. The second baron, who was created Earl of March in 1328, was attainted in 1330 and the barony as well as the earldom was forfeited.

The second time, it was created as a re-grant; The son of the 1st Earl of March, Edmund de Mortimer, was summoned to parliament on 20 November 1331. The second baron of this creation became Earl of March in 1354 upon the reversal of the attainder. The two titles then merged. The barony either merged in crown in 1461 or became extinct in 1425.

== Barons Mortimer of Wigmore (1295–1330) ==
- Edmund Mortimer, 1st Baron Mortimer of Wigmore (d. 1304)
- Roger Mortimer, 2nd Baron Mortimer of Wigmore (d. 1330) attainted & forfeit 1330

== Barons Mortimer of Wigmore (1331) ==
- Edmund Mortimer, 1st Baron Mortimer of Wigmore (c. 1302–1331)
- Roger Mortimer, 2nd Baron Mortimer of Wigmore (1328–1360)
- for further barons look at Earl of March (English Peerage, creation of 1328)
