= John FitzReginald =

13th-14th century English noble

Arms of John FitzReginald: Gules, three lions rampant or.

John FitzReginald (died 1310), also known as John FitzReynold, Lord of Blenlevenny was an English noble. He was a signatory of the Barons' Letter of 1301.

He was the eldest son of Reginald FitzPiers. He succeeded to the minor Marcher Lordship of Blaenllynfi after his father's death in 1286. He was a signatory of the Barons Letter of 1301, that was proposed to be sent to Pope Boniface VIII, as a repudiation of the Pope's claim of feudal overlordship of Scotland, in the papal bull Scimus Fili.

FitzReginald was summoned to parliament in 1294 as Baron FitzReginald. He was summoned twice to parliament with the last summons ending in 1307. Following the death of King Edward I of England, John granted the reversion of all his lands to the new king, Edward II of England. In 1309, Edward II issued a charter granting the reversion of these lands to Rhys ap Hywel.

John died in 1310. He was succeeded by his son Herbert, by his first wife who is unknown. John married secondly Agnes de Ferrers, the widow of Robert de Muscegros, she was the daughter of William de Ferrers, Earl of Derby and Margaret de Quincy.
