= Thomas de Multon, 1st Baron Multon of Egremont =

13th-14th century Scottish noble

Thomas de Multon
- Baron Multon of Egremont
- Arms of Thomas de Multon of Egremont: Argent, three bars gules.
- Died: 1322
- Spouse: Eleanor de Burgh
- Father: Thomas de Multon of Egremont
- Mother: Emoine Le Boteler

Thomas de Multon (died 1322), Lord of Egremont, was an English noble.

He was the eldest son of Thomas de Multon of Egremont and Emoine Le Boteler. Thomas was summoned to parliament as Baron Multon of Egremont, between 1297 and 1320, being engaged in the wars with Scotland.

== Marriage and issue ==
He married Eleanor, daughter of Richard de Burgh, Earl of Ulster and Margaret, they are known to have had the following issue:

- John de Multon, died without issue
- Joan de Multon, married Robert FitzWalter, the son of Robert FitzWalter, 1st Baron FitzWalter, had issue.
- Elizabeth de Multon, married firstly Robert Harington, with issue and secondly Walter de Bermingham.
- Margaret de Multon, married Thomas de Luci.

Peerage of England
New creation	Baron Multon of Egremont; 1299–1322	Succeeded by John de Multon
