= List of peers 1340–1349 =

This page lists all peers who held extant titles between 1340 and 1349.

== Peerage of England ==
Title	Holder	Date gained	Date lost	Notes
Duke of Cornwall (1337)	Edward, the Black Prince	1337	1376	
Earl of Surrey (1088)	John de Warenne, 7th Earl of Surrey	1304	1347	Died
Earl of Surrey (1088)	Richard FitzAlan, 8th Earl of Surrey	1347	1376	10th Earl of Arundel
Earl of Warwick (1088)	Thomas de Beauchamp, 11th Earl of Warwick	1315	1369	
Earl of Arundel (1138)	Richard FitzAlan, 10th Earl of Arundel	1331	1376	Succeeded to the senior Earldom of Surrey, see above
Earl of Oxford (1142)	John de Vere, 7th Earl of Oxford	1331	1360	
Earl of Hereford (1199)	Humphrey de Bohun, 6th Earl of Hereford	1336	1361	
Earl of Lincoln (1217)	Alice de Lacy, 4th Countess of Lincoln	1311	1348	Died, title extinct
Earl of Leicester (1265)	Henry Plantagenet, 3rd Earl of Leicester and Lancaster	1326	1345	Died
Earl of Leicester (1265)	Henry of Grosmont, 4th Earl of Leicester and Lancaster	1345	1361	Created Earl of Lincoln in 1349
Earl of Richmond (1306)	John III, Duke of Brittany	1334	1341	Died, peerage reverted to the Crown
Earl of Norfolk (1312)	none	1338	1375	
Earl of Kent (1321)	John, 3rd Earl of Kent	1331	1352	
Earl of March (1328)	none	1330	1354	Attainted
Earl of Devon (1335)	Hugh de Courtenay, 1st Earl of Devon	1335	1340	Died
Earl of Devon (1335)	Hugh de Courtenay, 2nd Earl of Devon	1340	1377	
Earl of Salisbury (1337)	William Montagu, 1st Earl of Salisbury	1337	1344	Died
Earl of Salisbury (1337)	William de Montacute, 2nd Earl of Salisbury	1344	1397	
Earl of Derby (1337)	Henry of Grosmont	1337	1361	Succeeded to the more senior Earldom of Leicester, see above
Earl of Gloucester (1337)	Hugh de Audley, 1st Earl of Gloucester	1337	1347	Died, Earldom extinct, Barony Audly succeeded by his daughter, see below
Earl of Huntingdon (1337)	William de Clinton, 1st Earl of Huntingdon	1337	1354	
Earl of Northampton (1337)	William de Bohun, 1st Earl of Northampton	1337	1360	
Earl of Suffolk (1337)	Robert d'Ufford, 1st Earl of Suffolk	1337	1369	
Earl of Pembroke (1339)	Laurence Hastings, 1st Earl of Pembroke	1339	1348	Died
Earl of Pembroke (1339)	John Hastings, 2nd Earl of Pembroke	1348	1375	
Earl of Cambridge (1340)	William of Juliers, 1st Earl of Cambridge	1340	1361	New creation
Earl of Richmond (1341)	John of Montfort	1341	1342	New creation; Peerage resumed by the Crown
Earl of Richmond (1342)	John of Gaunt, 1st Earl of Richmond	1342	1372	New creation
Baron de Ros (1264)	William de Ros, 2nd Baron de Ros	1316	1342	Died
Baron de Ros (1264)	William de Ros, 3rd Baron de Ros	1342	1353	
Baron le Despencer (1264)	none	1326	1398	Attainted
Baron Basset of Drayton (1264)	Ralph Basset, 2nd Baron Basset of Drayton	1299	1343	Died
Baron Basset of Drayton (1264)	Ralph Basset, 3rd Baron Basset of Drayton	1343	1390	
Baron Basset of Sapcote (1264)	Simon Basset, 4th Baron Basset of Sapcote	1326	1360	Never summoned to Parliament
Baron Mowbray (1283)	John de Mowbray, 3rd Baron Mowbray	1322	1361	
Baron Astley (1295)	Thomas de Astley, 3rd Baron Astley	1314	1359	
Baron Berkeley (1295)	Thomas de Berkeley, 3rd Baron Berkeley	1326	1361	
Baron Corbet (1295)	John Corbet, 3rd Baron Corbet	1322	1347	Died, title extinct
Baron Fauconberg (1295)	John de Fauconberg, 3rd Baron Fauconberg	1318	1349	Died
Baron Fauconberg (1295)	Walter de Fauconberg, 4th Baron Fauconberg	1349	1362	
Baron FitzWalter (1295)	John FitzWalter, 3rd Baron FitzWalter	1328	1361	
Baron FitzWarine (1295)	Fulke FitzWarine, 2nd Baron FitzWarine	1315	1349	Died
Baron FitzWarine (1295)	Fulke FitzWarine, 3rd Baron FitzWarine	1349	1373	
Baron Grey de Wilton (1295)	Henry Grey, 3rd Baron Grey de Wilton	1323	1342	
Baron Grey de Wilton (1295)	Reginald Grey, 4th Baron Grey de Wilton	1323	1370	
Baron Hussee (1295)	Henry Hussee, 2nd Baron Hussee	1332	1349	
Baron Hussee (1295)	Henry Hussee, 2nd Baron Hussee	1349	13??	Died shortly after 1349
Baron Hylton (1295)	Alexander Hylton, 2nd Baron Hylton	1322	1360	
Baron Mauley (1295)	Peter de Mauley, 2nd Baron Mauley	1310	1355	
Baron Montfort (1295)	Peter de Montfort, 3rd Baron Montfort	1314	1367	
Baron Neville de Raby (1295)	Ralph Neville, 2nd Baron Neville de Raby	1331	1367	
Baron Poyntz (1295)	Nicholas Poyntz, 4thd Baron Poyntz	1333	1360	
Baron Segrave (1295)	John de Segrave, 3rd Baron Segrave	1325	1353	
Baron Umfraville (1295)	Gilbert de Umfraville, 3rd Baron Umfraville	1325	1381	
Baron Wake (1295)	John Wake, 1st Baron Wake	1300	1349	Died
Baron Wake (1295)	Margaret Wake, 3rd Baroness Wake	1349	1349	Died; title succeeded by the Earl of Kent (see above), and held by his heirs until 1408, when it fell into abeyance
Baron Bardolf (1299)	John Bardolf, 3rd Baron Bardolf	1328	1363	
Baron Clinton (1299)	John de Clinton, 3rd Baron Clinton	1335	1398	
Baron De La Warr (1299)	John la Warr, 2nd Baron De La Warr	1320	1347	Died
Baron De La Warr (1299)	Roger la Warr, 3rd Baron De La Warr	1347	1370	
Baron Deincourt (1299)	William Deincourt, 2nd Baron Deincourt	1327	1364	
Baron Ferrers of Chartley (1299)	Robert de Ferrers, 3rd Baron Ferrers of Chartley	1324	1350	
Baron FitzPayne (1299)	Robert FitzPayne, 2nd Baron FitzPayne	1316	1354	
Baron Grandison (1299)	Peter de Grandison, 2nd Baron Grandison	1335	1358	
Baron Lovel (1299)	John Lovel, 3rd Baron Lovel	1314	1347	Died
Baron Lovel (1299)	John Lovel, 4th Baron Lovel	1347	1361	
Baron Mohun (1299)	John de Mohun, 2nd Baron Mohun	1330	1376	
Baron Percy (1299)	Henry de Percy, 2nd Baron Percy	1315	1352	
Baron Rivers of Ongar (1299)	John Rivers, 2nd Baron Rivers	1311	1350	
Baron Scales (1299)	Robert de Scales, 3rd Baron Scales	1324	1369	
Baron Stafford (1299)	Ralph de Stafford, 2nd Baron Stafford	1309	1372	
Baron Tregoz (1299)	Thomas de Tregoz, 3rd Baron Tregoz	1322	1405	
Baron Welles (1299)	Adam de Welles, 3rd Baron Welles	1320	1345	Died
Baron Welles (1299)	John de Welles, 4th Baron Welles	1345	1361	
Baron Beauchamp of Somerset (1299)	John de Beauchamp, 2nd Baron Beauchamp	1336	1343	Died
Baron Beauchamp of Somerset (1299)	John de Beauchamp, 3rd Baron Beauchamp	1343	1361	
Baron Cauntelo (1299)	Nicholas de Cauntelo, 3rd Baron Cauntelo	1321	1355	
Baron de Clifford (1299)	Robert de Clifford, 3rd Baron de Clifford	1322	1344	Died
Baron de Clifford (1299)	Robert de Clifford, 4th Baron de Clifford	1344	1350	
Baron Ferrers of Groby (1299)	Henry Ferrers, 2nd Baron Ferrers of Groby	1325	1343	Died
Baron Ferrers of Groby (1299)	William Ferrers, 3rd Baron Ferrers of Groby	1343	1372	
Baron Furnivall (1299)	Thomas de Furnivall, 3rd Baron Furnivall	1339	1364	
Baron Grendon (1299)	Robert Grendon, 2nd Baron Grendon	1331	1348	Died, right to Barony appears to have devolved on the issue of his only sister
Baron Latimer (1299)	William Latimer, 4th Baron Latimer	1335	1381	
Baron Morley (1299)	Robert de Morley, 2nd Baron Morley	1310	1360	
Baron Saint John of Lageham (1299)	John St John, 3rd Baron Saint John of Lageham	1323	1349	Died, none of his heirs were summoned to Parliament in respect of this Barony
Baron Strange of Knockyn (1299)	Roger le Strange, 4th Baron Strange of Knockyn	1324	1349	Died
Baron Strange of Knockyn (1299)	Roger le Strange, 5th Baron Strange of Knockyn	1349	1381	
Baron Sudeley (1299)	John de Sudeley, 2nd Baron Sudeley	1336	1340	Died
Baron Sudeley (1299)	John de Sudeley, 3rd Baron Sudeley	1340	1367	
Baron Botetourt (1305)	John de Botetourt, 2nd Baron Botetourt	1324	1385	
Baron Boteler of Wemme (1308)	William Le Boteler, 2nd Baron Boteler of Wemme	1334	1361	
Baron Grelle (1308)	Thomas de Grelle, 1st Baron Grelle	1308	1347	Died, Barony became extinct
Baron Zouche of Haryngworth (1308)	William la Zouche, 1st Baron Zouche	1308	1352	
Baron Beaumont (1309)	Henry Beaumont, 1st Baron Beaumont	1309	1340	Died
Baron Beaumont (1309)	John Beaumont, 2nd Baron Beaumont	1340	1342	Died
Baron Beaumont (1309)	Henry Beaumont, 3rd Baron Beaumont	1342	1369	
Baron Everingham (1309)	Adam Everingham, 1st Baron Everingham	1309	1341	Died
Baron Everingham (1309)	Adam Everingham, 2nd Baron Everingham	1341	1379	
Baron Monthermer (1309)	Thomas de Monthermer, 2nd Baron Monthermer	1325	1340	Died
Baron Monthermer (1309)	Margaret de Monthermer, suo jure Baroness Monthermer	1340	1390	
Baron Strange of Blackmere (1309)	John le Strange, 2nd Baron Strange of Blackmere	1324	1349	Died
Baron Strange of Blackmere (1309)	Fulk le Strange, 3rd Baron Strange of Blackmere	1349	1349	Died
Baron Strange of Blackmere (1309)	John le Strange, 4th Baron Strange of Blackmere	1349	1361	
Baron Lisle (1311)	Robert de Lisle, 1st Baron Lisle	1311	1343	Died
Baron Lisle (1311)	John de Lisle, 2nd Baron Lisle	1343	1356	
Baron Nevill (1311)	John de Nevill, 2nd Baron Nevill	1336	1358	
Baron Audley of Heleigh (1313)	James de Audley, 2nd Baron Audley of Heleigh	1316	1386	
Baron Brun (1313)	Maurice le Brun, 1st Baron Brun	1313	1355	
Baron Cobham of Kent (1313)	John de Cobham, 2nd Baron Cobham of Kent	1339	1355	
Baron Northwode (1313)	Roger de Northwode, 2nd Baron Northwode	1319	1361	
Baron Saint Amand (1313)	Almaric de St Amand, 2nd Baron Saint Amand	1330	1382	
Baron Cherleton (1313)	John Cherleton, 1st Baron Cherleton	1313	1353	
Baron Say (1313)	Geoffrey de Say, 2nd Baron Say	1322	1359	
Baron Willoughby de Eresby (1313)	John de Willoughby, 2nd Baron Willoughby de Eresby	1317	1349	
Baron Willoughby de Eresby (1313)	John de Willoughby, 3rd Baron Willoughby de Eresby	1349	1372	
Baron Columbers (1314)	Philip de Columbers, 1st Baron Columbers	1314	1342	Died, Barony became extinct
Baron Holand (1314)	Robert de Holland, 2nd Baron Holand	1328	1373	
Baron Audley (1317)	Margaret de Audley, suo jure Baroness Audley	1347	1347-1351	
Baron Strabolgi (1318)	David Strabolgi, 3rd Baron Strabolgi	1335	1375	
Baron Arcedekne (1321)	John le Arcedekne, 2nd Baron Arcedekne	1329	1350	
Baron Dacre (1321)	William Dacre, 2nd Baron Dacre	1339	1361	
Baron FitzHugh (1321)	Henry FitzHugh, 1st Baron FitzHugh	1321	1356	
Baron Greystock (1321)	William de Greystock, 2nd Baron Greystock	1323	1358	
Baron Lucy (1321)	Anthony de Lucy, 1st Baron Lucy	1321	1343	Died
Baron Lucy (1321)	Thomas de Lucy, 2nd Baron Lucy	1343	1365	
Baron Aton (1324)	Gilbert de Aton, 1st Baron Aton	1324	1342	Died
Baron Aton (1324)	William de Aton, 2nd Baron Aton	1342	1373	
Baron Grey of Ruthin (1325)	Roger Grey, 1st Baron Grey de Ruthyn	1324	1353	
Baron Harington (1326)	John Harington, 1st Baron Harington	1324	1347	Died
Baron Harington (1326)	John Harington, 2nd Baron Harington	1347	1363	
Baron Blount (1326)	William le Blount, 2nd Baron Blount	1330	aft. 1366	
Baron Ingham (1328)	Oliver de Ingham, 1st Baron Ingham	1328	1344	Died, title fell into abeyance
Baron Burghersh (1330)	Bartholomew de Burghersh, 1st Baron Burghersh	1330	1355	
Baron Maltravers (1330)	John Maltravers, 1st Baron Maltravers	1330	1364	
Baron Darcy de Knayth (1332)	John Darcy, 1st Baron Darcy de Knayth	1332	1347	Died
Baron Darcy de Knayth (1332)	John Darcy, 2nd Baron Darcy de Knayth	1347	1356	
Baron Talbot (1332)	Gilbert Talbot, 1st Baron Talbot	1332	1346	Died
Baron Talbot (1332)	Richard Talbot, 2nd Baron Talbot	1346	1356	
Baron Verdon (1332)	John de Verdon, 1st Baron Verdon	1332	1342	Died, none of his heirs were summoned to Parliament in respect of this Barony
Baron Sutton of Holderness (1332)	John Sutton, 2nd Baron Sutton of Holderness	1338	1356	
Baron Meinell (1336)	William de Meinill, 1st Baron Meinill	1336	1342	Died
Baron Meinell (1336)	Elizabet de Meinill, suo jure Baroness Meinill	1342	1368	
Baron Leyburn (1337)	John de Leyburn, 1st Baron Leyburn	1337	1384	
Baron Poynings (1337)	Michael de Poynings, 2nd Baron Poynings	1339	1369	
Baron Chandos (1337)	Roger de Chandos, 1st Baron Chandos	1337	1353	
Baron le Despencer (1338)	Hugh le Despencer, 1st Baron le Despencer	1338	1349	Died, Barony extinct
Baron Grey of Rotherfield (1330)	John de Grey, 1st Baron Grey of Rotherfield	1338	1360	
Baron Cobham of Sterborough (1342)	Reginald de Cobham, 1st Baron Cobham of Sterborough	1342	1361	New creation
Baron Bradeston (1342)	Thomas de Bradeston, 1st Baron Bradeston	1342	1360	New creation
Baron Bourchier (1342)	Robert Bourchier, 1st Baron Bourchier	1342	1349	New creation, died
Baron Bourchier (1342)	John Bourchier, 2nd Baron Bourchier	1349	1400	
Baron Braose (1342)	Thomas de Braose, 1st Baron Braose	1342	1361	New creation
Baron Bulmer (1342)	Ralph de Bulmer, 1st Baron Bulmer	1342	1357	New creation
Baron Colevill (1342)	Robert de Colvill, 1st Baron Colvill	1342	1368	New creation
Baron Montacute (1342)	Edward de Montacute, 1st Baron Montacute	1342	1361	New creation
Baron Norwich (1342)	John de Norwich, 1st Baron Norwich	1342	1362	New creation
Baron Strivelyn (1342)	John de Strivelyn, 1st Baron Strivelyn	1342	1378	New creation
Baron Ughtred (1342)	Thomas Ughtred, 1st Baron Ughtred	1343	1365	New creation
Baron Manny (1347)	Walter Manny, 1st Baron Manny	1347	1371	New creation
Baron Dagworth (1347)	Thomas de Dagworth, 1st Baron Dagworth	1347	1359	New creation
Baron Saint Philibert (1348)	John St Philibert, 1st Baron St Philibert	1348	1359	New creation
Baron Hussee (1348)	John Hussee, 1st Baron Hussee	1348	1361	New creation
Baron Balliol (1349)	Edward de Balliol, 1st Baron Balliol	1349	1363	New creation

== Peerage of Scotland ==
Title	Holder	Date gained	Date lost	Notes
Earl of Mar (1114)	Thomas, Earl of Mar	1332	1377	
Earl of Dunbar (1115)	Patrick V, Earl of March	1308	1368	
Earl of Fife (1129)	Donnchadh IV, Earl of Fife	1288	1353	
Earl of Menteith (1160)	Mary II, Countess of Menteith	1333	1360	
Earl of Lennox (1184)	Domhnall, Earl of Lennox	1333	1373	
Earl of Ross (1215)	Uilleam III, Earl of Ross	1334	1372	
Earl of Sutherland (1235)	William de Moravia, 5th Earl of Sutherland	1333	1370	
Earl of Moray (1312)	John Randolph, 3rd Earl of Moray	1332	1346	Died, title extinct
Earl of Angus (1330)	Thomas Stewart, 2nd Earl of Angus	1331	1361	
Earl of Wigtown (1341)	Malcolm Fleming, Earl of Wigtown	1341	1363	New creation
Earl of Atholl (1341)	William Douglas, 1st Earl of Atholl	1341	1341	New creation; resigned the Earldom
Earl of Atholl (1342)	Robert Stewart, 1st Earl of Atholl	1342	1371	New creation
Earl of Strathearn (1344)	Maurice de Moravia, Earl of Strathearn	1344	1346	New creation; died, title extinct

== Peerage of Ireland ==
Title	Holder	Date gained	Date lost	Notes
Earl of Ulster (1264)	Elizabeth de Burgh, 4th Countess of Ulster	1333	1363	
Earl of Kildare (1316)	Maurice FitzGerald, 4th Earl of Kildare	1329	1390	
Earl of Ormond (1328)	James Butler, 2nd Earl of Ormond	1338	1382	
Earl of Desmond (1329)	Maurice FitzGerald, 1st Earl of Desmond	1329	1356	
Baron Athenry (1172)	Thomas de Bermingham	1322	1374	
Baron Kingsale (1223)	Miles de Courcy, 7th Baron Kingsale	1338	1358	
Baron Kerry (1223)	John Fitzmaurice, 5th Baron Kerry	1339	1348	Died
Baron Kerry (1223)	Maurice Fitzmaurice, 6th Baron Kerry	1348	1398	
Baron Barry (1261)	David Barry, 5th Baron Barry	1330	1347	Died
Baron Barry (1261)	David Barry, 6th Baron Barry	1347	1392	

Preceded by List of peers 1330–1339	Lists of peers by decade 1340–1349	Succeeded by List of peers 1350–1359
