= List of peers 1350–1359 =

This page lists all peers who held extant titles between 1350 and 1359.

== Peerage of England ==
Title	Holder	Date gained	Date lost	Notes
Duke of Cornwall (1337)	Edward, the Black Prince	1337	1376	
Duke of Lancaster (1351)	Henry of Grosmont, 1st Duke of Lancaster	1351	1361	New creation for the 4th Earl of Leicester and Lancaster
Earl of Surrey (1088)	Richard FitzAlan, 8th Earl of Surrey	1347	1376	10th Earl of Arundel
Earl of Warwick (1088)	Thomas de Beauchamp, 11th Earl of Warwick	1315	1369	
Earl of Oxford (1142)	John de Vere, 7th Earl of Oxford	1331	1360	
Earl of Hereford (1199)	Humphrey de Bohun, 6th Earl of Hereford	1336	1361	
Earl of Norfolk (1312)	none	1338	1375	
Earl of Kent (1321)	John, 3rd Earl of Kent	1332	1352	Died
Earl of Kent (1321)	Joan of Kent	1352	1385	
Earl of March (1328)	none	1330	1354	Attainted
Earl of March (1328)	Roger Mortimer, 2nd Earl of March	1354	1360	Restored
Earl of Devon (1335)	Hugh de Courtenay, 2nd Earl of Devon	1340	1377	
Earl of Salisbury (1337)	William de Montacute, 2nd Earl of Salisbury	1344	1397	
Earl of Huntingdon (1337)	William de Clinton, 1st Earl of Huntingdon	1337	1354	Died, title extinct
Earl of Northampton (1337)	William de Bohun, 1st Earl of Northampton	1337	1360	
Earl of Suffolk (1337)	Robert d'Ufford, 1st Earl of Suffolk	1337	1369	
Earl of Pembroke (1339)	John Hastings, 2nd Earl of Pembroke	1348	1375	
Earl of Cambridge (1340)	William of Juliers, 1st Earl of Cambridge	1340	1361	
Earl of Richmond (1342)	John of Gaunt, 1st Earl of Richmond	1342	1372	
Earl of Stafford (1351)	Ralph de Stafford, 1st Earl of Stafford	1351	1372	New creation
Baron de Ros (1264)	William de Ros, 3rd Baron de Ros	1342	1353	Died
Baron de Ros (1264)	Thomas de Ros, 4th Baron de Ros	1353	1383	
Baron le Despencer (1264)	none	1326	1398	Attainted
Baron Basset of Drayton (1264)	Ralph Basset, 3rd Baron Basset of Drayton	1343	1390	
Baron Basset of Sapcote (1264)	Simon Basset, 4th Baron Basset of Sapcote	1326	1360	Never summoned to Parliament
Baron Mowbray (1283)	John de Mowbray, 3rd Baron Mowbray	1322	1361	
Baron Astley (1295)	Thomas de Astley, 3rd Baron Astley	1314	1359	Died; none of his heirs were summoned to Parliament in respect of this Barony
Baron Berkeley (1295)	Thomas de Berkeley, 3rd Baron Berkeley	1326	1361	
Baron Fauconberg (1295)	Walter de Fauconberg, 4th Baron Fauconberg	1349	1362	
Baron FitzWalter (1295)	John FitzWalter, 3rd Baron FitzWalter	1328	1361	
Baron FitzWarine (1295)	Fulke FitzWarine, 3rd Baron FitzWarine	1349	1373	
Baron Grey de Wilton (1295)	Reginald Grey, 4th Baron Grey de Wilton	1323	1370	
Baron Hylton (1295)	Alexander Hylton, 2nd Baron Hylton	1322	1360	
Baron Mauley (1295)	Peter de Mauley, 2nd Baron Mauley	1310	1355	Died
Baron Mauley (1295)	Peter de Mauley, 3rd Baron Mauley	1355	1389	
Baron Montfort (1295)	Peter de Montfort, 3rd Baron Montfort	1314	1367	
Baron Neville de Raby(1295)	Ralph Neville, 2nd Baron Neville de Raby	1331	1367	
Baron Poyntz (1295)	Nicholas Poyntz, 4thd Baron Poyntz	1333	1360	
Baron Segrave (1295)	John de Segrave, 3rd Baron Segrave	1325	1353	Died
Baron Segrave (1295)	Elizabeth de Segrave, suo jure Baroness Segrave	1353	1375	
Baron Umfraville (1295)	Gilbert de Umfraville, 3rd Baron Umfraville	1325	1381	
Baron Bardolf (1299)	John Bardolf, 3rd Baron Bardolf	1328	1363	
Baron Clinton (1299)	John de Clinton, 3rd Baron Clinton	1335	1398	
Baron De La Warr (1299)	Roger la Warr, 3rd Baron De La Warr	1347	1370	
Baron Deincourt (1299)	William Deincourt, 2nd Baron Deincourt	1327	1364	
Baron Ferrers of Chartley (1299)	Robert de Ferrers, 3rd Baron Ferrers of Chartley	1324	1350	Died
Baron Ferrers of Chartley (1299)	John de Ferrers, 4th Baron Ferrers of Chartley	1350	1367	
Baron FitzPayne (1299)	Robert FitzPayne, 2nd Baron FitzPayne	1316	1354	Died, Barony fell into abeyance
Baron Grandison (1299)	Peter de Grandison, 2nd Baron Grandison	1335	1358	Died
Baron Grandison (1299)	John de Grandison, 3rd Baron Grandison	1358	1369	
Baron Lovel (1299)	John Lovel, 4th Baron Lovel	1347	1361	
Baron Mohun (1299)	John de Mohun, 2nd Baron Mohun	1330	1376	
Baron Percy (1299)	Henry de Percy, 2nd Baron Percy	1315	1352	Died
Baron Percy (1299)	Henry de Percy, 3rd Baron Percy	1352	1368	
Baron Rivers of Ongar (1299)	John Rivers, 2nd Baron Rivers	1311	1350	Died; none of his heirs were summoned to Parliament in respect of this Barony
Baron Scales (1299)	Robert de Scales, 3rd Baron Scales	1324	1369	
Baron Stafford (1299)	Ralph de Stafford, 2nd Baron Stafford	1309	1372	Created Earl of Stafford, see above
Baron Tregoz (1299)	Thomas de Tregoz, 3rd Baron Tregoz	1322	1405	
Baron Welles (1299)	John de Welles, 4th Baron Welles	1345	1361	
Baron Beauchamp of Somerset (1299)	John de Beauchamp, 3rd Baron Beauchamp	1343	1361	
Baron Cauntelo (1299)	Nicholas de Cauntelo, 3rd Baron Cauntelo	1321	1355	Died; none of his heirs were summoned to Parliament in respect of this Barony
Baron de Clifford (1299)	Robert de Clifford, 4th Baron de Clifford	1344	1350	Died
Baron de Clifford (1299)	Roger de Clifford, 5th Baron de Clifford	1350	1389	
Baron Ferrers of Groby (1299)	William Ferrers, 3rd Baron Ferrers of Groby	1343	1372	
Baron Furnivall (1299)	Thomas de Furnivall, 3rd Baron Furnivall	1339	1364	
Baron Latimer (1299)	William Latimer, 4th Baron Latimer	1335	1381	
Baron Morley (1299)	Robert de Morley, 2nd Baron Morley	1310	1360	
Baron Strange of Knockyn (1299)	Roger le Strange, 5th Baron Strange of Knockyn	1349	1381	
Baron Sudeley (1299)	John de Sudeley, 3rd Baron Sudeley	1340	1367	
Baron Botetourt (1305)	John de Botetourt, 2nd Baron Botetourt	1324	1385	
Baron Boteler of Wemme (1308)	William Le Boteler, 2nd Baron Boteler of Wemme	1334	1361	
Baron Zouche of Haryngworth (1308)	William la Zouche, 1st Baron Zouche	1308	1352	Died
Baron Zouche of Haryngworth (1308)	William la Zouche, 2nd Baron Zouche	1352	1382	
Baron Beaumont (1309)	Henry Beaumont, 3rd Baron Beaumont	1342	1369	
Baron Everingham (1309)	Adam Everingham, 2nd Baron Everingham	1341	1379	
Baron Monthermer (1309)	Margaret de Monthermer, suo jure Baroness Monthermer	1340	1390	
Baron Strange of Blackmere (1309)	John le Strange, 4th Baron Strange of Blackmere	1349	1361	
Baron Lisle (1311)	John de Lisle, 2nd Baron Lisle	1343	1356	Died
Baron Lisle (1311)	Robert de Lisle, 3rd Baron Lisle	1356	1399	
Baron Nevill (1311)	John de Nevill, 2nd Baron Nevill	1336	1358	Died, title extinct
Baron Audley of Heleigh (1313)	James de Audley, 2nd Baron Audley of Heleigh	1316	1386	
Baron Brun (1313)	Maurice le Brun, 1st Baron Brun	1313	1355	Died, none of his heirs were summoned to Parliament in respect of this Barony
Baron Cobham of Kent (1313)	John de Cobham, 2nd Baron Cobham of Kent	1339	1355	Died
Baron Cobham of Kent (1313)	John de Cobham, 3rd Baron Cobham of Kent	1355	1408	
Baron Northwode (1313)	Roger de Northwode, 2nd Baron Northwode	1319	1361	
Baron Saint Amand (1313)	Almaric de St Amand, 2nd Baron Saint Amand	1330	1382	
Baron Cherleton (1313)	John Cherleton, 1st Baron Cherleton	1313	1353	Died
Baron Cherleton (1313)	John Cherleton, 2nd Baron Cherleton	1353	1360	
Baron Say (1313)	Geoffrey de Say, 2nd Baron Say	1322	1359	Died
Baron Say (1313)	William de Say, 3rd Baron Say	1359	1375	
Baron Willoughby de Eresby (1313)	John de Willoughby, 3rd Baron Willoughby de Eresby	1349	1372	
Baron Holand (1314)	Robert de Holland, 2nd Baron Holand	1328	1373	
Baron Audley (1317)	Margaret de Audley, suo jure Baroness Audley	1347	1347-1351	Died
Baron Audley (1317)	Hugh de Stafford, 3rd Baron Audley	abt. 1351	1386	
Baron Strabolgi (1318)	David Strabolgi, 3rd Baron Strabolgi	1335	1375	
Baron Arcedekne (1321)	John le Arcedekne, 2nd Baron Arcedekne	1329	1350	Died, none of his heirs were summoned to Parliament in respect of this Barony
Baron Dacre (1321)	William Dacre, 2nd Baron Dacre	1339	1361	
Baron FitzHugh (1321)	Henry FitzHugh, 1st Baron FitzHugh	1321	1356	Died
Baron FitzHugh (1321)	Hugh FitzHugh, 2nd Baron FitzHugh	1356	1386	
Baron Greystock (1321)	William de Greystock, 2nd Baron Greystock	1323	1358	Died
Baron Greystock (1321)	Ralph de Greystock, 3rd Baron Greystock	1358	1417	
Baron Lucy (1321)	Thomas de Lucy, 2nd Baron Lucy	1343	1365	
Baron Aton (1324)	William de Aton, 2nd Baron Aton	1342	1373	
Baron Grey of Ruthin (1325)	Roger Grey, 1st Baron Grey de Ruthyn	1324	1353	Died
Baron Grey of Ruthin (1325)	Reginald Grey, 2nd Baron Grey de Ruthyn	1353	1388	
Baron Harington (1326)	John Harington, 2nd Baron Harington	1347	1363	
Baron Blount (1326)	William le Blount, 2nd Baron Blount	1330	aft. 1366	
Baron Burghersh (1330)	Bartholomew de Burghersh, 1st Baron Burghersh	1330	1355	Died
Baron Burghersh (1330)	Bartholomew de Burghersh, 2nd Baron Burghersh	1355	1369	
Baron Maltravers (1330)	John Maltravers, 1st Baron Maltravers	1330	1364	
Baron Darcy de Knayth (1332)	John Darcy, 2nd Baron Darcy de Knayth	1347	1356	Died
Baron Darcy de Knayth (1332)	John Darcy, 3rd Baron Darcy de Knayth	1356	1362	
Baron Talbot (1332)	Richard Talbot, 2nd Baron Talbot	1346	1356	Died
Baron Talbot (1332)	Gilbert Talbot, 3rd Baron Talbot	1356	1387	
Baron Sutton of Holderness (1332)	John Sutton, 2nd Baron Sutton of Holderness	1338	1356	Died, none of his heirs were summoned to Parliament in respect of this Barony
Baron Meinell (1336)	Elizabet de Meinill, suo jure Baroness Meinill	1342	1368	
Baron Leyburn (1337)	John de Leyburn, 1st Baron Leyburn	1337	1384	
Baron Poynings (1337)	Michael de Poynings, 2nd Baron Poynings	1339	1369	
Baron Chandos (1337)	Roger de Chandos, 1st Baron Chandos	1337	1353	Died, none of his heirs were summoned to Parliament in respect of this Barony
Baron Grey of Rotherfield (1330)	John de Grey, 1st Baron Grey of Rotherfield	1338	1360	
Baron Cobham of Sterborough (1342)	Reginald de Cobham, 1st Baron Cobham of Sterborough	1342	1361	
Baron Bradeston (1342)	Thomas de Bradeston, 1st Baron Bradeston	1342	1360	
Baron Bourchier (1342)	John Bourchier, 2nd Baron Bourchier	1349	1400	
Baron Braose (1342)	Thomas de Braose, 1st Baron Braose	1342	1361	
Baron Bulmer (1342)	Ralph de Bulmer, 1st Baron Bulmer	1342	1357	Died, title dormant
Baron Colevill (1342)	Robert de Colvill, 1st Baron Colvill	1342	1368	
Baron Montacute (1342)	Edward de Montacute, 1st Baron Montacute	1342	1361	
Baron Norwich (1342)	John de Norwich, 1st Baron Norwich	1342	1362	
Baron Strivelyn (1342)	John de Strivelyn, 1st Baron Strivelyn	1342	1378	
Baron Ughtred (1342)	Thomas Ughtred, 1st Baron Ughtred	1343	1365	
Baron Manny (1347)	Walter Manny, 1st Baron Manny	1347	1371	
Baron Dagworth (1347)	Thomas de Dagworth, 1st Baron Dagworth	1347	1359	Died, none of his heirs were summoned to Parliament in respect of this Barony
Baron Saint Philibert (1348)	John St Philibert, 1st Baron St Philibert	1348	1359	Died, title extinct
Baron Hussee (1348)	John Hussee, 1st Baron Hussee	1348	1361	
Baron Balliol (1349)	Edward de Balliol, 1st Baron Balliol	1349	1363	
Baron Bryan (1350)	Guy Bryan, 1st Baron Bryan	1350	1390	New creation
Baron Burnell (1350)	Nicholas Burnell, 1st Baron Burnell	1350	1383	New creation
Baron Beauchamp de Warwick (1350)	John de Beauchamp, 1st Baron Beauchamp	1350	1360	New creation
Baron Scrope of Masham (1350)	Henry Scrope, 1st Baron Scrope of Masham	1350	1391	New creation
Baron Musgrave (1350)	Thomas Musgrave, 1st Baron Musgrave	1350	1382	New creation
Baron Huntingfield (1351)	William de Huntingfield, 1st Baron Huntingfield	1351	1376	New creation
Baron Saint Maur (1351)	Nicholas St Maur, 1st Baron Saint Maur	1351	1361	New creation
Baron Holand (1353)	Thomas Holland, 1st Baron Holand	1353	1360	New creation
Baron le Despencer (1357)	Edward le Despencer, 1st Baron le Despencer	1357	1375	New creation
Baron Lisle (1357)	Gerard de Lisle, 1st Baron Lisle	1357	1360	New creation
Baron Montacute (1357)	John de Montacute, 1st Baron Montacute	1357	1390	New creation
Baron Musgrave (1350)	Thomas Musgrave, 1st Baron Musgrave	1350	1382	New creation

== Peerage of Scotland ==
Title	Holder	Date gained	Date lost	Notes
Earl of Mar (1114)	Thomas, Earl of Mar	1332	1377	
Earl of Dunbar (1115)	Patrick V, Earl of March	1308	1368	
Earl of Fife (1129)	Donnchadh IV, Earl of Fife	1288	1353	Died
Earl of Fife (1129)	Isabella, Countess of Fife	1353	1371	
Earl of Menteith (1160)	Mary II, Countess of Menteith	1333	1360	
Earl of Lennox (1184)	Domhnall, Earl of Lennox	1333	1373	
Earl of Ross (1215)	Uilleam III, Earl of Ross	1334	1372	
Earl of Sutherland (1235)	William de Moravia, 5th Earl of Sutherland	1333	1370	
Earl of Angus (1330)	Thomas Stewart, 2nd Earl of Angus	1331	1361	
Earl of Wigtown (1341)	Malcolm Fleming, Earl of Wigtown	1341	1363	
Earl of Atholl (1342)	Robert Stewart, 1st Earl of Atholl	1342	1371	Created Earl of Strathearn in 1358
Earl of Douglas (1358)	William Douglas, 1st Earl of Douglas	1358	1384	New creation

== Peerage of Ireland ==
Title	Holder	Date gained	Date lost	Notes
Earl of Ulster (1264)	Elizabeth de Burgh, 4th Countess of Ulster	1333	1363	
Earl of Kildare (1316)	Maurice FitzGerald, 4th Earl of Kildare	1329	1390	
Earl of Ormond (1328)	James Butler, 2nd Earl of Ormond	1338	1382	
Earl of Desmond (1329)	Maurice FitzGerald, 1st Earl of Desmond	1329	1356	Died
Earl of Desmond (1329)	Maurice FitzGerald, 2nd Earl of Desmond	1356	1358	Died
Earl of Desmond (1329)	Gerald FitzGerald, 3rd Earl of Desmond	1358	1398	
Baron Athenry (1172)	Thomas de Bermingham	1322	1374	
Baron Kingsale (1223)	Miles de Courcy, 7th Baron Kingsale	1338	1358	Died
Baron Kingsale (1223)	John de Courcy, 8th Baron Kingsale	1358	1387	
Baron Kerry (1223)	Maurice Fitzmaurice, 6th Baron Kerry	1348	1398	
Baron Barry (1261)	David Barry, 6th Baron Barry	1347	1392	

Preceded by List of peers 1340–1349	Lists of peers by decade 1350–1359	Succeeded by List of peers 1360–1369
