= List of peers 1360–1369 =

This page lists all peers who held extant titles between 1360 and 1369.

== Peerage of England ==
Title	Holder	Date gained	Date lost	Notes
Duke of Cornwall (1337)	Edward, the Black Prince	1337	1376	
Duke of Lancaster (1351)	Henry of Grosmont, 1st Duke of Lancaster	1351	1361	Died, titles became extinct
Duke of Clarence (1362)	Lionel of Antwerp, 1st Duke of Clarence	1362	1368	New creation; died, title became extinct
Duke of Lancaster (1362)	John of Gaunt, 1st Duke of Lancaster	1362	1399	New creation
Earl of Surrey (1088)	Richard FitzAlan, 8th Earl of Surrey	1347	1376	10th Earl of Arundel
Earl of Warwick (1088)	Thomas de Beauchamp, 11th Earl of Warwick	1315	1369	Died
Earl of Warwick (1088)	Thomas de Beauchamp, 12th Earl of Warwick	1369	1401	
Earl of Oxford (1142)	John de Vere, 7th Earl of Oxford	1331	1360	Died
Earl of Oxford (1142)	Thomas de Vere, 8th Earl of Oxford	1360	1371	
Earl of Hereford (1199)	Humphrey de Bohun, 6th Earl of Hereford	1336	1361	Died
Earl of Hereford (1199)	Humphrey de Bohun, 7th Earl of Hereford	1361	1373	
Earl of Norfolk (1312)	none	1338	1375	
Earl of Kent (1321)	Joan of Kent	1352	1385	
Earl of March (1328)	Roger Mortimer, 2nd Earl of March	1354	1360	Died
Earl of March (1328)	Edmund Mortimer, 3rd Earl of March	1360	1381	
Earl of Devon (1335)	Hugh de Courtenay, 2nd Earl of Devon	1340	1377	
Earl of Salisbury (1337)	William de Montacute, 2nd Earl of Salisbury	1344	1397	
Earl of Northampton (1337)	William de Bohun, 1st Earl of Northampton	1337	1360	Died
Earl of Northampton (1337)	Humphrey de Bohun, 2nd Earl of Northampton	1360	1373	In 1361 succeeded to the more senior Earldom of Hereford, see above
Earl of Suffolk (1337)	Robert d'Ufford, 1st Earl of Suffolk	1337	1369	Died
Earl of Suffolk (1337)	William de Ufford, 2nd Earl of Suffolk	1369	1382	
Earl of Pembroke (1339)	John Hastings, 2nd Earl of Pembroke	1348	1375	
Earl of Cambridge (1340)	William of Juliers, 1st Earl of Cambridge	1340	1361	Died, title did not pass to his heir
Earl of Richmond (1342)	John of Gaunt, 1st Earl of Richmond	1342	1372	Created Duke of Lancaster, see above
Earl of Stafford (1351)	Ralph de Stafford, 1st Earl of Stafford	1351	1372	
Earl of Kent (1360)	Thomas Holland, 1st Earl of Kent	1360	1360	New creation, died
Earl of Kent (1360)	Thomas Holland, 2nd Earl of Kent	1360	1397	
Earl of Cambridge (1362)	Edmund of Langley, 1st Earl of Cambridge	1362	1402	New creation
Earl of Bedford (1366)	Enguerrand de Coucy, 1st Earl of Bedford	1366	1377	New creation
Baron de Ros (1264)	Thomas de Ros, 4th Baron de Ros	1353	1383	
Baron le Despencer (1264)	none	1326	1398	Attainted
Baron Basset of Drayton (1264)	Ralph Basset, 3rd Baron Basset of Drayton	1343	1390	
Baron Basset of Sapcote (1264)	Simon Basset, 4th Baron Basset of Sapcote	1326	1360	Never summoned to Parliament; died
Baron Basset of Sapcote (1264)	Ralph Basset, 5th Baron Basset of Sapcote	1360	1378	
Baron Mowbray (1283)	John de Mowbray, 3rd Baron Mowbray	1322	1361	Died
Baron Mowbray (1283)	John de Mowbray, 4th Baron Mowbray	1361	1368	Died
Baron Mowbray (1283)	John de Mowbray, 5th Baron Mowbray	1368	1379	
Baron Berkeley (1295)	Thomas de Berkeley, 3rd Baron Berkeley	1326	1361	Died
Baron Berkeley (1295)	Maurice de Berkeley, 4th Baron Berkeley	1361	1368	Died
Baron Berkeley (1295)	Thomas de Berkeley, 5th Baron Berkeley	1368	1418	
Baron Fauconberg (1295)	Walter de Fauconberg, 4th Baron Fauconberg	1349	1362	Died
Baron Fauconberg (1295)	Thomas de Fauconberg, 5th Baron Fauconberg	1362	1407	
Baron FitzWalter (1295)	John FitzWalter, 3rd Baron FitzWalter	1328	1361	Died
Baron FitzWalter (1295)	Walter FitzWalter, 4th Baron FitzWalter	1361	1386	
Baron FitzWarine (1295)	Fulke FitzWarine, 3rd Baron FitzWarine	1349	1373	
Baron Grey de Wilton (1295)	Reginald Grey, 4th Baron Grey de Wilton	1323	1370	
Baron Hylton (1295)	Alexander Hylton, 2nd Baron Hylton	1322	1360	Died; none of his heirs received summons to Parliament in respect of this Barony
Baron Mauley (1295)	Peter de Mauley, 3rd Baron Mauley	1355	1389	
Baron Montfort (1295)	Peter de Montfort, 3rd Baron Montfort	1314	1367	Died, Barony extinct or in abeyance
Baron Neville de Raby (1295)	Ralph Neville, 2nd Baron Neville de Raby	1331	1367	Died
Baron Neville de Raby (1295)	John Neville, 3rd Baron Neville de Raby	1367	1388	
Baron Poyntz (1295)	Nicholas Poyntz, 4thd Baron Poyntz	1333	1360	Died, Barony fell into abeyance
Baron Segrave (1295)	Elizabeth de Segrave, suo jure Baroness Segrave	1353	1375	
Baron Umfraville (1295)	Gilbert de Umfraville, 3rd Baron Umfraville	1325	1381	
Baron Bardolf (1299)	John Bardolf, 3rd Baron Bardolf	1328	1363	Died
Baron Bardolf (1299)	William Bardolf, 4th Baron Bardolf	1363	1385	
Baron Clinton (1299)	John de Clinton, 3rd Baron Clinton	1335	1398	
Baron De La Warr (1299)	Roger la Warr, 3rd Baron De La Warr	1347	1370	
Baron Deincourt (1299)	William Deincourt, 2nd Baron Deincourt	1327	1364	Died; none of his heirs received summons to Parliament in respect of this Barony
Baron Ferrers of Chartley (1299)	John de Ferrers, 4th Baron Ferrers of Chartley	1350	1367	Died
Baron Ferrers of Chartley (1299)	Robert de Ferrers, 5th Baron Ferrers of Chartley	1367	1416	
Baron Grandison (1299)	John de Grandison, 3rd Baron Grandison	1358	1369	Died
Baron Grandison (1299)	Thomas de Grandison, 4th Baron Grandison	1369	1375	
Baron Lovel (1299)	John Lovel, 4th Baron Lovel	1347	1361	Died
Baron Lovel (1299)	John Lovel, 5th Baron Lovel	1361	1408	
Baron Mohun (1299)	John de Mohun, 2nd Baron Mohun	1330	1376	
Baron Percy (1299)	Henry de Percy, 3rd Baron Percy	1352	1368	Died
Baron Percy (1299)	Henry Percy, 4th Baron Percy	1368	1408	
Baron Scales (1299)	Robert de Scales, 3rd Baron Scales	1324	1369	Died
Baron Scales (1299)	Roger de Scales, 4th Baron Scales	1369	1386	
Baron Tregoz (1299)	Thomas de Tregoz, 3rd Baron Tregoz	1322	1405	
Baron Welles (1299)	John de Welles, 4th Baron Welles	1345	1361	Died
Baron Welles (1299)	John de Welles, 5th Baron Welles	1361	1421	
Baron Beauchamp of Somerset (1299)	John de Beauchamp, 3rd Baron Beauchamp	1343	1361	Died, Barony fell into abeyance
Baron de Clifford (1299)	Roger de Clifford, 5th Baron de Clifford	1350	1389	
Baron Ferrers of Groby (1299)	William Ferrers, 3rd Baron Ferrers of Groby	1343	1372	
Baron Furnivall (1299)	Thomas de Furnivall, 3rd Baron Furnivall	1339	1364	Died
Baron Furnivall (1299)	William de Furnivall, 4th Baron Furnivall	1364	1383	
Baron Latimer (1299)	William Latimer, 4th Baron Latimer	1335	1381	
Baron Morley (1299)	Robert de Morley, 2nd Baron Morley	1310	1360	Died
Baron Morley (1299)	William de Morley, 3rd Baron Morley	1360	1379	
Baron Strange of Knockyn (1299)	Roger le Strange, 5th Baron Strange of Knockyn	1349	1381	
Baron Sudeley (1299)	John de Sudeley, 3rd Baron Sudeley	1340	1367	Died, Barony fell into abeyance
Baron Botetourt (1305)	John de Botetourt, 2nd Baron Botetourt	1324	1385	
Baron Boteler of Wemme (1308)	William Le Boteler, 2nd Baron Boteler of Wemme	1334	1361	Died
Baron Boteler of Wemme (1308)	William Le Boteler, 3rd Baron Boteler of Wemme	1361	1369	Died
Baron Boteler of Wemme (1308)	Elizabeth Le Boteler, de jure Baroness Boteler of Wemme	1361	1411	
Baron Zouche of Haryngworth (1308)	William la Zouche, 2nd Baron Zouche	1352	1382	
Baron Beaumont (1309)	Henry Beaumont, 3rd Baron Beaumont	1342	1369	
Baron Beaumont (1309)	John Beaumont, 4th Baron Beaumont	1369	1396	
Baron Everingham (1309)	Adam Everingham, 2nd Baron Everingham	1341	1379	
Baron Monthermer (1309)	Margaret de Monthermer, suo jure Baroness Monthermer	1340	1390	
Baron Strange of Blackmere (1309)	John le Strange, 4th Baron Strange of Blackmere	1349	1361	
Baron Strange of Blackmere (1309)	John le Strange, 5th Baron Strange of Blackmere	1361	1375	
Baron Lisle (1311)	Robert de Lisle, 3rd Baron Lisle	1356	1399	
Baron Audley of Heleigh (1313)	James de Audley, 2nd Baron Audley of Heleigh	1316	1386	
Baron Cobham of Kent (1313)	John de Cobham, 3rd Baron Cobham of Kent	1355	1408	
Baron Northwode (1313)	Roger de Northwode, 2nd Baron Northwode	1319	1361	Died
Baron Northwode (1313)	John de Northwode, 3rd Baron Northwode	1361	1378	
Baron Saint Amand (1313)	Almaric de St Amand, 2nd Baron Saint Amand	1330	1382	
Baron Cherleton (1313)	John Cherleton, 2nd Baron Cherleton	1353	1360	Died
Baron Cherleton (1313)	John Cherleton, 3rd Baron Cherleton	1360	1374	
Baron Say (1313)	William de Say, 3rd Baron Say	1359	1375	
Baron Willoughby de Eresby (1313)	John de Willoughby, 3rd Baron Willoughby de Eresby	1349	1372	
Baron Holand (1314)	Robert de Holland, 2nd Baron Holand	1328	1373	
Baron Audley (1317)	Hugh de Stafford, 3rd Baron Audley	abt. 1351	1386	
Baron Strabolgi (1318)	David Strabolgi, 3rd Baron Strabolgi	1335	1375	
Baron Dacre (1321)	William Dacre, 2nd Baron Dacre	1339	1361	Died
Baron Dacre (1321)	Ralph Dacre, 3rd Baron Dacre	1361	1375	
Baron FitzHugh (1321)	Hugh FitzHugh, 2nd Baron FitzHugh	1356	1386	
Baron Greystock (1321)	Ralph de Greystock, 3rd Baron Greystock	1358	1417	
Baron Lucy (1321)	Thomas de Lucy, 2nd Baron Lucy	1343	1365	Died, none of his heir were summoned to Parliament in respect of this Barony
Baron Aton (1324)	William de Aton, 2nd Baron Aton	1342	1373	
Baron Grey of Ruthin (1325)	Reginald Grey, 2nd Baron Grey de Ruthyn	1353	1388	
Baron Harington (1326)	John Harington, 2nd Baron Harington	1347	1363	Died
Baron Harington (1326)	Robert Harington, 3rd Baron Harington	1363	1406	
Baron Blount (1326)	William le Blount, 2nd Baron Blount	1330	aft. 1366	Died, none of his heirs were summoned to Parliament in respect of this Barony
Baron Burghersh (1330)	Bartholomew de Burghersh, 2nd Baron Burghersh	1355	1369	Died
Baron Burghersh (1330)	Elizabeth de Burghersh, 3rd Baroness Burghersh	1369	1409	
Baron Maltravers (1330)	John Maltravers, 1st Baron Maltravers	1330	1364	Died
Baron Maltravers (1330)	in abeyance	1364	1377	
Baron Darcy de Knayth (1332)	John Darcy, 3rd Baron Darcy de Knayth	1356	1362	Died
Baron Darcy de Knayth (1332)	Philip Darcy, 4th Baron Darcy de Knayth	1362	1398	
Baron Talbot (1332)	Gilbert Talbot, 3rd Baron Talbot	1356	1387	
Baron Meinell (1336)	Elizabet de Meinill, suo jure Baroness Meinill	1342	1368	Died, title passed to her son, Baron Darcy de Knayth
Baron Leyburn (1337)	John de Leyburn, 1st Baron Leyburn	1337	1384	
Baron Poynings (1337)	Michael de Poynings, 2nd Baron Poynings	1339	1369	Died
Baron Poynings (1337)	Thomas de Poynings, 3rd Baron Poynings	1369	1375	
Baron Grey of Rotherfield (1330)	John de Grey, 1st Baron Grey of Rotherfield	1338	1360	Died
Baron Grey of Rotherfield (1330)	John de Grey, 2nd Baron Grey of Rotherfield	1360	1375	
Baron Cobham of Sterborough (1342)	Reginald de Cobham, 1st Baron Cobham of Sterborough	1342	1361	Died
Baron Cobham of Sterborough (1342)	Reginald de Cobham, 2nd Baron Cobham of Sterborough	1361	1403	
Baron Bradeston (1342)	Thomas de Bradeston, 1st Baron Bradeston	1342	1360	Died, title dormant
Baron Bourchier (1342)	John Bourchier, 2nd Baron Bourchier	1349	1400	
Baron Braose (1342)	Thomas de Braose, 1st Baron Braose	1342	1361	Died, none of his heirs were summoned to Parliament in respect of this Barony
Baron Colevill (1342)	Robert de Colvill, 1st Baron Colvill	1342	1368	Died
Baron Colevill (1342)	Robert de Colvill, 2nd Baron Colvill	1368	1370	
Baron Montacute (1342)	Edward de Montacute, 1st Baron Montacute	1342	1361	Died
Baron Montacute (1342)	Joan de Ufford, suo jure Baroness Montacute	1361	1375	
Baron Norwich (1342)	John de Norwich, 1st Baron Norwich	1342	1362	Died, none of his heirs were summoned to Parliament in respect of this Barony
Baron Strivelyn (1342)	John de Strivelyn, 1st Baron Strivelyn	1342	1378	
Baron Ughtred (1342)	Thomas Ughtred, 1st Baron Ughtred	1343	1365	Died, none of his heirs were summoned to Parliament in respect of this Barony
Baron Manny (1347)	Walter Manny, 1st Baron Manny	1347	1371	
Baron Hussee (1348)	John Hussee, 1st Baron Hussee	1348	1361	Died, title extinct
Baron Balliol (1349)	Edward de Balliol, 1st Baron Balliol	1349	1363	Died, title extinct
Baron Bryan (1350)	Guy Bryan, 1st Baron Bryan	1350	1390	
Baron Burnell (1350)	Nicholas Burnell, 1st Baron Burnell	1350	1383	
Baron Beauchamp de Warwick (1350)	John de Beauchamp, 1st Baron Beauchamp	1350	1360	Died, title extinct
Baron Scrope of Masham (1350)	Henry Scrope, 1st Baron Scrope of Masham	1350	1391	
Baron Musgrave (1350)	Thomas Musgrave, 1st Baron Musgrave	1350	1382	
Baron Huntingfield (1351)	William de Huntingfield, 1st Baron Huntingfield	1351	1376	
Baron Saint Maur (1351)	Nicholas St Maur, 1st Baron Saint Maur	1351	1361	Died
Baron Saint Maur (1351)	Nicholas St Maur, 2nd Baron Saint Maur	1361	1361	Died
Baron Saint Maur (1351)	Richard St Maur, 3rd Baron Saint Maur	1361	1401	
Baron Holand (1353)	Thomas Holland, 1st Baron Holand	1353	1360	Created Earl of Kent, see above
Baron le Despencer (1357)	Edward le Despencer, 1st Baron le Despencer	1357	1375	
Baron Lisle (1357)	Gerard de Lisle, 1st Baron Lisle	1357	1360	Died
Baron Lisle (1357)	Warine de Lisle, 2nd Baron Lisle	1360	1382	
Baron Montacute (1357)	John de Montacute, 1st Baron Montacute	1357	1390	
Baron Benhale (1360)	Robert de Benhale, 1st Baron Benhale	1360	Aft 1369	New creation; died, title extinct
Baron Ufford (1360)	William de Ufford, 1st Baron Ufford	1360	1361	New creation; died, title extinct
Baron Kirketon (1362)	John de Kirketon, 1st Baron Kirketon	1362	1367	New creation; died, title extinct
Baron Beauchamp of Bletso (1363)	Roger Beauchamp, 1st Baron Beauchamp of Bletso	1363	1380	New creation
Baron Bohun (1363)	John de Bohun, 1st Baron Bohun	1363	1367	New creation; died, none of his heirs were summoned to Parliament in respect of this Barony
Baron Ufford (1364)	William de Ufford, 1st Baron Ufford	1364	1382	New creation; succeeded as Earl of Suffolk, see above
Baron Botreaux (1368)	William de Botreaux, 1st Baron Botreaux	1368	1391	New creation

== Peerage of Scotland ==
Title	Holder	Date gained	Date lost	Notes
Earl of Mar (1114)	Thomas, Earl of Mar	1332	1377	
Earl of Dunbar (1115)	Patrick V, Earl of March	1308	1368	Died
Earl of Dunbar (1115)	George I, Earl of March	1368	1420	
Earl of Fife (1129)	Isabella, Countess of Fife	1353	1371	
Earl of Menteith (1160)	Mary II, Countess of Menteith	1333	1360	Died
Earl of Menteith (1160)	Margaret Graham, Countess of Menteith	1360	1390	
Earl of Lennox (1184)	Domhnall, Earl of Lennox	1333	1373	
Earl of Ross (1215)	Uilleam III, Earl of Ross	1334	1372	
Earl of Sutherland (1235)	William de Moravia, 5th Earl of Sutherland	1333	1370	
Earl of Angus (1330)	Thomas Stewart, 2nd Earl of Angus	1331	1361	Died
Earl of Angus (1330)	Thomas Stewart, 3rd Earl of Angus	1361	1377	
Earl of Wigtown (1341)	Malcolm Fleming, Earl of Wigtown	1341	1363	Died
Earl of Wigtown (1341)	Thomas Fleming, Earl of Wigtown	1363	1372	
Earl of Atholl (1342)	Robert Stewart, 1st Earl of Atholl	1342	1371	
Earl of Douglas (1358)	William Douglas, 1st Earl of Douglas	1358	1384	
Earl of Carrick (1368)	John Stewart, Earl of Carrick	1368	1390	New creation

== Peerage of Ireland ==
Title	Holder	Date gained	Date lost	Notes
Earl of Ulster (1264)	Elizabeth de Burgh, 4th Countess of Ulster	1333	1363	Died
Earl of Ulster (1264)	Philippa, 5th Countess of Ulster	1363	1382	
Earl of Kildare (1316)	Maurice FitzGerald, 4th Earl of Kildare	1329	1390	
Earl of Ormond (1328)	James Butler, 2nd Earl of Ormond	1338	1382	
Earl of Desmond (1329)	Gerald FitzGerald, 3rd Earl of Desmond	1358	1398	
Baron Athenry (1172)	Thomas de Bermingham	1322	1374	
Baron Kingsale (1223)	John de Courcy, 8th Baron Kingsale	1358	1387	
Baron Kerry (1223)	Maurice Fitzmaurice, 6th Baron Kerry	1348	1398	
Baron Barry (1261)	David Barry, 6th Baron Barry	1347	1392	

Preceded by List of peers 1350–1359	Lists of peers by decade 1360–1369	Succeeded by List of peers 1370–1379
