= List of peers 1330–1339 =

This page lists all peers who held extant titles between 1330 and 1339.

== Peerage of England ==
Title	Holder	Date gained	Date lost	Notes
Duke of Cornwall (1337)	Edward, the Black Prince	1337	1376	
Earl of Surrey (1088)	John de Warenne, 7th Earl of Surrey	1304	1347	
Earl of Warwick (1088)	Thomas de Beauchamp, 11th Earl of Warwick	1315	1369	
Earl of Arundel (1138)	Richard FitzAlan, 10th Earl of Arundel	1331	1376	Restored
Earl of Oxford (1142)	Robert de Vere, 6th Earl of Oxford	1297	1331	Died
Earl of Oxford (1142)	John de Vere, 7th Earl of Oxford	1331	1360	
Earl of Hereford (1199)	John de Bohun, 5th Earl of Hereford	1322	1336	Died
Earl of Hereford (1199)	Humphrey de Bohun, 6th Earl of Hereford	1336	1361	
Earl of Lincoln (1217)	Alice de Lacy, 4th Countess of Lincoln	1311	1348	
Earl of Leicester (1265)	Henry Plantagenet, 3rd Earl of Leicester and Lancaster	1326	1345	
Earl of Richmond (1306)	John of Brittany, Earl of Richmond	1306	1334	Died
Earl of Richmond (1306)	John III, Duke of Brittany	1334	1341	
Earl of Norfolk (1312)	Thomas of Brotherton, 1st Earl of Norfolk	1312	1338	Died, peerage lapsed between his two daughters and coheirs
Earl of Norfolk (1312)	none	1338	1375	
Earl of Kent (1321)	Edmund of Woodstock, 1st Earl of Kent	1321	1330	Attainted; died
Earl of Kent (1321)	Edmund, 2nd Earl of Kent	1330	1331	Restored; died
Earl of Kent (1321)	John, 3rd Earl of Kent	1331	1352	
Earl of March (1328)	Roger Mortimer, 1st Earl of March	1328	1330	Attainted, and his honour were forfeited
Earl of March (1328)	none	1330	1354	Attainted
Earl of Cornwall (1328)	John of Eltham, Earl of Cornwall	1328	1336	New creation; died, title extinct
Earl of Devon (1335)	Hugh de Courtenay, 1st Earl of Devon	1335	1340	New creation
Earl of Salisbury (1337)	William Montagu, 1st Earl of Salisbury	1337	1344	New creation
Earl of Derby (1337)	Henry of Grosmont	1337	1361	New creation
Earl of Gloucester (1337)	Hugh de Audley, 1st Earl of Gloucester	1337	1347	New creation
Earl of Huntingdon (1337)	William de Clinton, Earl of Huntingdon	1337	1354	New creation; cr. Baron Clinton in 1330
Earl of Northampton (1337)	William de Bohun, 1st Earl of Northampton	1337	1360	New creation
Earl of Suffolk (1337)	Robert d'Ufford, 1st Earl of Suffolk	1337	1369	New creation
Earl of Pembroke (1339)	Laurence Hastings, 1st Earl of Pembroke	1339	1348	New creation
Baron de Ros (1264)	William de Ros, 2nd Baron de Ros	1316	1342	
Baron le Despencer (1264)	none	1326	1398	Attainted
Baron Basset of Drayton (1264)	Ralph Basset, 2nd Baron Basset of Drayton	1299	1343	
Baron Basset of Sapcote (1264)	Simon Basset, 4th Baron Basset of Sapcote	1326	1360	Never summoned to Parliament
Baron Mowbray (1283)	John de Mowbray, 3rd Baron Mowbray	1322	1361	
Baron Hastings (1290)	Laurence Hastings, 3rd Baron Hastings	1325	1348	Created Earl of Pembroke, see above
Baron Astley (1295)	Thomas de Astley, 3rd Baron Astley	1314	1359	
Baron Berkeley (1295)	Thomas de Berkeley, 3rd Baron Berkeley	1326	1361	
Baron Canville (1295)	William de Canville, 2nd Baron Canville	1308	1338	Died, title fell into abeyance
Baron Clavering (1295)	John de Clavering	1310	1332	Died, none of his heirs were summoned to Parliament in respect of this Barony
Baron Corbet (1295)	John Corbet, 3rd Baron Corbet	1322	1347	
Baron Fauconberg (1295)	John de Fauconberg, 3rd Baron Fauconberg	1318	1349	
Baron FitzWalter (1295)	John FitzWalter, 3rd Baron FitzWalter	1328	1361	
Baron FitzWarine (1295)	Fulke FitzWarine, 2nd Baron FitzWarine	1315	1349	
Baron Grey de Wilton (1295)	Henry Grey, 3rd Baron Grey de Wilton	1323	1342	
Baron Hussee (1295)	Henry Hussee, 1st Baron Hussee	1295	1332	Died
Baron Hussee (1295)	Henry Hussee, 2nd Baron Hussee	1332	1349	
Baron Hylton (1295)	Alexander Hylton, 2nd Baron Hylton	1322	1360	
Baron Knovill (1295)	Bogo de Knovill, 2nd Baron Knovill	1306	1338	
Baron Knovill (1295)	John de Knovill, 3rd Baron Knovill	1338	13??	Title extinct on his death
Baron Kyme (1295)	William de Kyme, 2nd Baron Kyme	1323	1338	Died, title extinct
Baron Mauley (1295)	Peter de Mauley, 2nd Baron Mauley	1310	1355	
Baron Montfort (1295)	Peter de Montfort, 3rd Baron Montfort	1314	1367	
Baron Neville de Raby (1295)	Ralph Neville, 1st Baron Neville de Raby	1295	1331	Died
Baron Neville de Raby (1295)	Ralph Neville, 2nd Baron Neville de Raby	1331	1367	
Baron Poyntz (1295)	Hugh Poyntz, 3rd Baron Poyntz	1311	1333	Died
Baron Poyntz (1295)	Nicholas Poyntz, 4thd Baron Poyntz	1333	1360	
Baron Segrave (1295)	John de Segrave, 3rd Baron Segrave	1325	1353	
Baron Umfraville (1295)	Gilbert de Umfraville, 3rd Baron Umfraville	1325	1381	
Baron Wake (1295)	John Wake, 1st Baron Wake	1300	1349	
Baron Bardolf (1299)	John Bardolf, 3rd Baron Bardolf	1328	1363	
Baron Clinton (1299)	John de Clinton, 2nd Baron Clinton	1310	1335	Died
Baron Clinton (1299)	John de Clinton, 3rd Baron Clinton	1335	1398	
Baron De La Warr (1299)	John la Warr, 2nd Baron De La Warr	1320	1347	
Baron Deincourt (1299)	William Deincourt, 2nd Baron Deincourt	1327	1364	
Baron Devereux (1299)	William Devereux, 1st Baron Devereux	1299	1330?	
Baron Ferrers of Chartley (1299)	Robert de Ferrers, 3rd Baron Ferrers of Chartley	1324	1350	
Baron FitzPayne (1299)	Robert FitzPayne, 2nd Baron FitzPayne	1316	1354	
Baron Grandison (1299)	William de Grandison, 1st Baron Grandison	1299	1335	Died
Baron Grandison (1299)	Peter de Grandison, 2nd Baron Grandison	1335	1358	
Baron Lovel (1299)	John Lovel, 3rd Baron Lovel	1314	1347	
Baron Mohun (1299)	John de Mohun, 1st Baron Mohun	1299	1330	Died
Baron Mohun (1299)	John de Mohun, 2nd Baron Mohun	1330	1376	
Baron Mortimer of Chirke (1299)	Roger de Mortimer, 1st Baron Mortimer of Chirke	1299	1336	Died, none of his heirs were summoned to Parliament in respect of this Barony
Baron Multon of Egremont (1299)	John de Multon, 2nd Baron Multon of Egremont	1322	1334	Died, Barony fell into abeyance
Baron Percy (1299)	Henry de Percy, 2nd Baron Percy	1315	1352	
Baron Rivers of Ongar (1299)	John Rivers, 2nd Baron Rivers	1311	1350	
Baron Scales (1299)	Robert de Scales, 3rd Baron Scales	1324	1369	
Baron Stafford (1299)	Ralph de Stafford, 2nd Baron Stafford	1309	1372	
Baron Tregoz (1299)	Thomas de Tregoz, 3rd Baron Tregoz	1322	1405	
Baron Welles (1299)	Adam de Welles, 3rd Baron Welles	1320	1345	
Baron Beauchamp of Somerset (1299)	John de Beauchamp, 1st Baron Beauchamp	1299	1336	Died
Baron Beauchamp of Somerset (1299)	John de Beauchamp, 2nd Baron Beauchamp	1336	1343	
Baron Cauntelo (1299)	Nicholas de Cauntelo, 3rd Baron Cauntelo	1321	1355	
Baron de Clifford (1299)	Robert de Clifford, 3rd Baron de Clifford	1322	1344	
Baron Darcy (1299)	Philip Darcy, Baron Darcy	1299	1332	Died, none of his heirs were summoned to Parliament in respect of this Barony
Baron Ferrers of Groby (1299)	Henry Ferrers, 2nd Baron Ferrers of Groby	1325	1343	
Baron Furnivall (1299)	Thomas de Furnivall, 1st Baron Furnivall	1299	1332	Died
Baron Furnivall (1299)	Thomas de Furnivall, 2nd Baron Furnivall	1332	1339	Died
Baron Furnivall (1299)	Thomas de Furnivall, 3rd Baron Furnivall	1339	1364	
Baron Grendon (1299)	Ralph Grendon, 1st Baron Grendon	1299	1331	Died
Baron Grendon (1299)	Robert Grendon, 2nd Baron Grendon	1331	1348	
Baron Lancaster (1299)	John de Lancastre, 1st Baron Lancastre	1299	1334	Died, title extinct
Baron Latimer (1299)	Thomas Latimer, 1st Baron Latimer	1299	1334	Died, none of his heirs were summoned to Parliament in respect of this Barony
Baron Latimer (1299)	William Latimer, 3rd Baron Latimer	1327	1335	Died
Baron Latimer (1299)	William Latimer, 4th Baron Latimer	1335	1381	
Baron Lisle (1299)	John de Lisle, 2nd Baron Lisle	1304	1337	Died
Baron Montagu (1299)	William de Montacute, 3rd Baron Montagu	1319	1344	Created Earl of Salisbury, see above
Baron Morley (1299)	Robert de Morley, 2nd Baron Morley	1310	1360	
Baron Saint John of Lageham (1299)	John St John, 3rd Baron Saint John of Lageham	1323	1349	
Baron Strange of Knockyn (1299)	Roger le Strange, 4th Baron Strange of Knockyn	1324	1349	
Baron Sudeley (1299)	John de Sudeley, 1st Baron Sudeley	1299	1336	Died
Baron Sudeley (1299)	John de Sudeley, 2nd Baron Sudeley	1336	1340	
Baron Botetourt (1305)	John de Botetourt, 2nd Baron Botetourt	1324	1385	
Baron Multon of Gilsland (1307)	John de Multon, 2nd Baron Multon of Gilsland	1313	1334	Died, Barony fell into abeyance
Baron Boteler of Wemme (1308)	William Le Boteler, 1st Baron Boteler of Wemme	1308	1334	Died
Baron Boteler of Wemme (1308)	William Le Boteler, 2nd Baron Boteler of Wemme	1334	1361	
Baron Cromwell (1308)	John de Cromwell, 1st Baron Cromwell	1308	1335	Died, title extinct
Baron Grelle (1308)	Thomas de Grelle, 1st Baron Grelle	1308	1347	
Baron Zouche of Haryngworth (1308)	William la Zouche, 1st Baron Zouche	1308	1352	
Baron Ufford (1309)	Robert de Ufford, 2nd Baron Ufford	1316	1369	Created Earl of Suffolk, see above
Baron Beaumont (1309)	Henry Beaumont, 1st Baron Beaumont	1309	1340	
Baron Everingham (1309)	Adam Everingham, 1st Baron Everingham	1309	1341	
Baron FitzHenry (1309)	Aucher FitzHenry, 1st Baron FitzHenry	1309	1339	Died, none of his heirs were summoned to Parliament in respect of this Barony
Baron Monthermer (1309)	Thomas de Monthermer, 2nd Baron Monthermer	1325	1340	
Baron Strange of Blackmere (1309)	John le Strange, 2nd Baron Strange of Blackmere	1324	1349	
Baron Badlesmere (1309)	Giles de Badlesmere, 2nd Baron Badlesmere	1322	1338	Died, Barony fell into abeyance
Baron Lisle (1311)	Robert de Lisle, 1st Baron Lisle	1311	1343	
Baron Nevill (1311)	Hugh de Nevill, 1st Baron Nevill	1311	1336	Died
Baron Nevill (1311)	John de Nevill, 2nd Baron Nevill	1336	1358	
Baron Audley of Heleigh (1313)	James de Audley, 2nd Baron Audley of Heleigh	1316	1386	
Baron Bavent (1313)	Roger Bavent, 1st Baron Bavent	1313	1335	Died, none of his heirs were summoned to Parliament in respect of this Barony
Baron Brun (1313)	Maurice le Brun, 1st Baron Brun	1313	1355	
Baron Cobham of Kent (1313)	Henry de Cobham, 1st Baron Cobham of Kent	1313	1339	Died
Baron Cobham of Kent (1313)	John de Cobham, 2nd Baron Cobham of Kent	1339	1355	
Baron FitzBernard (1313)	Thomas Fitzbernard, 1st Baron Fitzbernard	1313	Bef. 1334	Died, none of his heirs were summoned to Parliament in respect of this Barony
Baron Northwode (1313)	Roger de Northwode, 2nd Baron Northwode	1319	1361	
Baron Saint Amand (1313)	John de St Amand, 1st Baron Saint Amand	1313	1330	Died
Baron Saint Amand (1313)	Almaric de St Amand, 2nd Baron Saint Amand	1330	1382	
Baron Cherleton (1313)	John Cherleton, 1st Baron Cherleton	1313	1353	
Baron Marmion (1313)	John Marmion, 2nd Baron Marmion	1323	1335	Died, none of his heirs were summoned to Parliament in respect of this Barony
Baron Say (1313)	Geoffrey de Say, 2nd Baron Say	1322	1359	
Baron Willoughby de Eresby (1313)	John de Willoughby, 2nd Baron Willoughby de Eresby	1317	1349	
Baron Camoys (1313)	Ralph de Camoys, 1st Baron Camoys	1313	1335	Died, none of his heirs were summoned to Parliament in respect of this Barony
Baron Columbers (1314)	Philip de Columbers, 1st Baron Columbers	1314	1342	
Baron Holand (1314)	Robert de Holland, 2nd Baron Holand	1328	1373	
Baron Audley (1317)	Hugh de Audley, 1st Baron Audley	1317	1347	Created Earl of Gloucester, see above
Baron Strabolgi (1318)	David Strabolgi, 2nd Baron Strabolgi	1326	1335	
Baron Strabolgi (1318)	David Strabolgi, 3rd Baron Strabolgi	1335	1375	
Baron Arcedekne (1321)	John le Arcedekne, 2nd Baron Arcedekne	1329	1350	
Baron Dacre (1321)	Ralph Dacre, 1st Baron Dacre	1321	1339	Died
Baron Dacre (1321)	William Dacre, 2nd Baron Dacre	1339	1361	
Baron FitzHugh (1321)	Henry FitzHugh, 1st Baron FitzHugh	1321	1356	
Baron Greystock (1321)	William de Greystock, 2nd Baron Greystock	1323	1358	
Baron Lucy (1321)	Anthony de Lucy, 1st Baron Lucy	1321	1343	
Baron Pecche of Wormleighton (1321)	John Peche, 1st Baron Peche	1321	1339	Died, none of his heirs were summoned to Parliament in respect of this Barony
Baron Zouche of Mortimer (1323)	William la Zouche, 1st Baron Zouche of Mortimer	1323	1337	Died, none of his heirs were summoned to Parliament in respect of this Barony
Baron Aton (1324)	Gilbert de Aton, 1st Baron Aton	1324	1342	
Baron Grey of Ruthin (1325)	Roger Grey, 1st Baron Grey de Ruthyn	1324	1353	
Baron Harington (1326)	John Harington, 1st Baron Harington	1324	1347	
Baron Blount (1326)	Thomas le Blount, 1st Baron Blount	1326	1330	Died
Baron Blount (1326)	William le Blount, 2nd Baron Blount	1330	aft. 1366	
Baron Cobham of Rundale (1326)	Stephen de Cobham, 1st Baron Cobham of Rundale	1326	1332	Died, none of his heirs were summoned to Parliament in respect of this Barony
Baron D'Amorie (1326)	Richard D'Amorie, 1st Baron D'Amorie	1326	1330	Died, none of his heirs were summoned to Parliament in respect of this Barony
Baron Strange (1326)	Eubulus le Strange, 1st Baron Strange	1326	1335	Died, title extinct
Baron Wateville (1326)	Robert Wateville, 1st Baron Wateville	1326	1333	Nothing further is known of him
Baron Burgh (1327)	William de Burgh, 1st Baron Burgh	1327	1333	Died, none of his heirs were summoned to Parliament in respect of this Barony
Baron Ingham (1328)	Oliver de Ingham, 1st Baron Ingham	1328	1344	
Baron Burghersh (1330)	Bartholomew de Burghersh, 1st Baron Burghersh	1330	1355	New creation
Baron Maltravers (1330)	John Maltravers, 1st Baron Maltravers	1330	1364	New creation
Baron Darcy de Knayth (1332)	John Darcy, 1st Baron Darcy de Knayth	1332	1347	New creation
Baron Ros of Watton (1332)	John de Ros, 1st Baron Ros of Watton	1332	1338	New creation; died, title extinct
Baron Talbot (1332)	Gilbert Talbot, 1st Baron Talbot	1332	1346	New creation
Baron Uvedale (1332)	Peter de Uvedale, 1st Baron Uvedale	1332	1336	New creation; died, title extinct
Baron Verdon (1332)	John de Verdon, 1st Baron Verdon	1332	1342	New creation
Baron Hausted (1332)	John de Hausted, 1st Baron Hausted	1332	1336	New creation; died, none of his heirs were summoned to Parliament in respect of this Barony
Baron Sutton of Holderness (1332)	John Sutton, 1st Baron Sutton of Holderness	1332	1338	New creation; died
Baron Sutton of Holderness (1332)	John Sutton, 2nd Baron Sutton of Holderness	1338	1356	
Baron Edrington (1336)	Henry de Edrington, 1st Baron Edrington	1336	?	New creation; nothing further is known of him
Baron Meinell (1336)	William de Meinill, 1st Baron Meinill	1336	1342	New creation
Baron Frene (1336)	Hugh de Frene, 1st Baron Frene	1336	1336	New creation; died, title extinct
Baron Swynnerton (1337)	Roger Swynnerton, 1st Baron Swynnerton	1337	1338	New creation; died, title dormant
Baron Leyburn (1337)	John de Leyburn, 1st Baron Leyburn	1337	1384	New creation
Baron Monthermer (1337)	Edward de Monthermer, 1st Baron Monthermer	1337	?	New creation; died, title extinct
Baron Poynings (1337)	Thomas de Poynings, 1st Baron Poynings	1337	1339	New creation, died
Baron Poynings (1337)	Michael de Poynings, 2nd Baron Poynings	1339	1369	
Baron Chandos (1337)	Roger de Chandos, 1st Baron Chandos	1337	1353	New creation
Baron le Despencer (1330)	Hugh le Despencer, 1st Baron le Despencer	1338	1349	New creation
Baron Grey of Rotherfield (1330)	John de Grey, 1st Baron Grey of Rotherfield	1338	1360	New creation

== Peerage of Scotland ==
Title	Holder	Date gained	Date lost	Notes
Earl of Mar (1114)	Domhnall II, Earl of Mar	1305	1332	Died
Earl of Mar (1114)	Thomas, Earl of Mar	1332	1377	
Earl of Dunbar (1115)	Patrick V, Earl of March	1308	1368	
Earl of Strathearn (1115)	Maol Íosa V, Earl of Strathearn	1329	1334	Attainted, and his honours became forfeited
Earl of Fife (1129)	Donnchadh IV, Earl of Fife	1288	1353	
Earl of Menteith (1160)	Muireadhach III, Earl of Menteith	1308	1333	Died
Earl of Menteith (1160)	Mary II, Countess of Menteith	1333	1360	
Earl of Lennox (1184)	Maol Choluim II, Earl of Lennox	1291	1333	Died
Earl of Lennox (1184)	Domhnall, Earl of Lennox	1333	1373	
Earl of Ross (1215)	Uilleam II, Earl of Ross	1274	1333	Died
Earl of Ross (1215)	Hugh, Earl of Ross	1333	1334	Died
Earl of Ross (1215)	Uilleam III, Earl of Ross	1334	1372	
Earl of Sutherland (1235)	William de Moravia, 3rd Earl of Sutherland	1307	1330	Died
Earl of Sutherland (1235)	William de Moravia, 5th Earl of Sutherland	1333	1370	
Earl of Moray (1312)	Thomas Randolph, 1st Earl of Moray	1312	1332	Died
Earl of Moray (1312)	Thomas Randolph, 2nd Earl of Moray	1332	1332	Died
Earl of Moray (1312)	John Randolph, 3rd Earl of Moray	1332	1346	
Earl of Atholl (1320)	John Campbell, Earl of Atholl	1320	1333	Died, title extinct
Earl of Angus (1330)	John Stewart, 1st Earl of Angus	1330	1331	New creation; died
Earl of Angus (1330)	Thomas Stewart, 2nd Earl of Angus	1331	1361	

== Peerage of Ireland ==
Title	Holder	Date gained	Date lost	Notes
Earl of Ulster (1264)	William Donn de Burgh, 3rd Earl of Ulster	1326	1333	
Earl of Ulster (1264)	Elizabeth de Burgh, 4th Countess of Ulster	1333	1363	
Earl of Kildare (1316)	Maurice FitzGerald, 4th Earl of Kildare	1329	1390	
Earl of Ormond (1328)	James Butler, 1st Earl of Ormond	1328	1338	Died
Earl of Ormond (1328)	James Butler, 2nd Earl of Ormond	1338	1382	
Earl of Desmond (1329)	Maurice FitzGerald, 1st Earl of Desmond	1329	1356	
Baron Athenry (1172)	Thomas de Bermingham	1322	1374	
Baron Kingsale (1223)	Miles de Courcy, 6th Baron Kingsale	1303	1338	Died
Baron Kingsale (1223)	Miles de Courcy, 7th Baron Kingsale	1338	1358	
Baron Kerry (1223)	Maurice Fitzmaurice, 4th Baron Kerry	1324	1339	Died
Baron Kerry (1223)	John Fitzmaurice, 5th Baron Kerry	1339	1348	
Baron Barry (1261)	John Barry, 4th Baron Barry	1290	1330	Died
Baron Barry (1261)	David Barry, 5th Baron Barry	1330	1347	

Preceded by List of peers 1320–1329	Lists of peers by decade 1330–1339	Succeeded by List of peers 1340–1349
