= List of peers 1370–1379 =

This page lists all peers who held extant titles between 1370 and 1379.

== Peerage of England ==
Title	Holder	Date gained	Date lost	Notes
Duke of Cornwall (1337)	Edward, the Black Prince	1337	1376	Died
Duke of Cornwall (1337)	None	1376	1399	
Duke of Lancaster (1362)	John of Gaunt, 1st Duke of Lancaster	1362	1399	Surrendered the Earldom of Richmond to the King in 1372
Duke of Cornwall (1376)	Richard of Bordeaux	1376	1377	Ascended the Throne, when all his honours merged in the Crown
Earl of Surrey (1088)	Richard FitzAlan, 8th Earl of Surrey	1347	1376	10th Earl of Arundel; died
Earl of Surrey (1088)	Richard FitzAlan, 9th Earl of Surrey	1376	1397	11th Earl of Arundel
Earl of Warwick (1088)	Thomas de Beauchamp, 12th Earl of Warwick	1369	1401	
Earl of Oxford (1142)	Thomas de Vere, 8th Earl of Oxford	1360	1371	Died
Earl of Oxford (1142)	Robert de Vere, 9th Earl of Oxford	1371	1388	
Earl of Hereford (1199)	Humphrey de Bohun, 7th Earl of Hereford	1361	1373	Died, titles extinct
Earl of Norfolk (1312)	none	1338	1375	
Earl of Norfolk (1312)	Margaret, 2nd Countess of Norfolk	1375	1399	On the death of her niece, she became the sole heir to her father's Earldom
Earl of Kent (1321)	Joan of Kent	1352	1385	
Earl of March (1328)	Edmund Mortimer, 3rd Earl of March	1360	1381	
Earl of Devon (1335)	Hugh de Courtenay, 2nd Earl of Devon	1340	1377	Died
Earl of Devon (1335)	Edward de Courtenay, 3rd Earl of Devon	1377	1419	
Earl of Salisbury (1337)	William de Montacute, 2nd Earl of Salisbury	1344	1397	
Earl of Suffolk (1337)	William de Ufford, 2nd Earl of Suffolk	1369	1382	
Earl of Pembroke (1339)	John Hastings, 2nd Earl of Pembroke	1348	1375	Died
Earl of Pembroke (1339)	John Hastings, 3rd Earl of Pembroke	1375	1389	
Earl of Stafford (1351)	Ralph de Stafford, 1st Earl of Stafford	1351	1372	Died
Earl of Stafford (1351)	Hugh de Stafford, 2nd Earl of Stafford	1372	1386	
Earl of Kent (1360)	Thomas Holland, 2nd Earl of Kent	1360	1397	
Earl of Cambridge (1362)	Edmund of Langley, 1st Earl of Cambridge	1362	1402	
Earl of Bedford (1366)	Enguerrand de Coucy, 1st Earl of Bedford	1366	1377	Resigned all English honours
Earl of Richmond (1372)	John V, Duke of Brittany	1372	1399	New creation
Earl of Buckingham (1377)	Thomas of Woodstock, 1st Earl of Buckingham	1377	1397	New creation
Earl of Nottingham (1377)	John de Mowbray, 1st Earl of Nottingham	1377	1382	New creation
Earl of Northumberland (1377)	Henry Percy, 1st Earl of Northumberland	1377	1406	New creation
Earl of Huntingdon (1377)	Guichard d'Angle	1377	1380	Died, title extinct
Baron de Ros (1264)	Thomas de Ros, 4th Baron de Ros	1353	1383	
Baron le Despencer (1264)	none	1326	1398	Attainted
Baron Basset of Drayton (1264)	Ralph Basset, 4th Baron Basset of Drayton	1344	1390	
Baron Basset of Sapcote (1264)	Ralph Basset, 5th Baron Basset of Sapcote	1360	1378	Died, title fell into abeyance
Baron Mowbray (1283)	John de Mowbray, 5th Baron Mowbray	1368	1379	Created Earl of Nottingham, see above;
Baron Berkeley (1295)	Thomas de Berkeley, 5th Baron Berkeley	1368	1418	
Baron Fauconberg (1295)	Thomas de Fauconberg, 5th Baron Fauconberg	1362	1407	
Baron FitzWalter (1295)	Walter FitzWalter, 4th Baron FitzWalter	1361	1386	
Baron FitzWarine (1295)	Fulke FitzWarine, 3rd Baron FitzWarine	1349	1373	Died
Baron FitzWarine (1295)	Fulke FitzWarine, 4th Baron FitzWarine	1373	1377	Died
Baron FitzWarine (1295)	Fulke FitzWarine, 5th Baron FitzWarine	1377	1391	
Baron Grey de Wilton (1295)	Reginald Grey, 4th Baron Grey de Wilton	1323	1370	Died
Baron Grey de Wilton (1295)	Henry Grey, 5th Baron Grey de Wilton	1370	1396	
Baron Mauley (1295)	Peter de Mauley, 3rd Baron Mauley	1355	1389	
Baron Neville de Raby (1295)	John Neville, 3rd Baron Neville de Raby	1367	1388	
Baron Segrave (1295)	Elizabeth de Segrave, suo jure Baroness Segrave	1353	1375	Died; title succeeded by Baron Mowbray, and held by his heirs since then
Baron Umfraville (1295)	Gilbert de Umfraville, 3rd Baron Umfraville	1325	1381	
Baron Bardolf (1299)	William Bardolf, 4th Baron Bardolf	1363	1385	
Baron Clinton (1299)	John de Clinton, 3rd Baron Clinton	1335	1398	
Baron De La Warr (1299)	Roger la Warr, 3rd Baron De La Warr	1347	1370	Died
Baron De La Warr (1299)	John la Warr, 4th Baron De La Warr	1370	1398	
Baron Ferrers of Chartley (1299)	Robert de Ferrers, 5th Baron Ferrers of Chartley	1367	1416	
Baron Grandison (1299)	Thomas de Grandison, 4th Baron Grandison	1369	1375	Died, Barony fell into abeyance
Baron Lovel (1299)	John Lovel, 5th Baron Lovel	1361	1408	
Baron Mohun (1299)	John de Mohun, 2nd Baron Mohun	1330	1376	Died, Barony fell into abeyance
Baron Percy (1299)	Henry Percy, 4th Baron Percy	1368	1408	Created Earl of Northumberland, see above
Baron Scales (1299)	Roger de Scales, 4th Baron Scales	1369	1386	
Baron Tregoz (1299)	Thomas de Tregoz, 3rd Baron Tregoz	1322	1405	
Baron Welles (1299)	John de Welles, 5th Baron Welles	1361	1421	
Baron de Clifford (1299)	Roger de Clifford, 5th Baron de Clifford	1350	1389	
Baron Ferrers of Groby (1299)	William Ferrers, 3rd Baron Ferrers of Groby	1343	1372	Died
Baron Ferrers of Groby (1299)	Henry Ferrers, 4th Baron Ferrers of Groby	1372	1388	
Baron Furnivall (1299)	William de Furnivall, 4th Baron Furnivall	1364	1383	
Baron Latimer (1299)	William Latimer, 4th Baron Latimer	1335	1381	
Baron Morley (1299)	William de Morley, 3rd Baron Morley	1360	1379	Died
Baron Morley (1299)	Thomas de Morley, 4th Baron Morley	1379	1416	
Baron Strange of Knockyn (1299)	Roger le Strange, 5th Baron Strange of Knockyn	1349	1381	
Baron Botetourt (1305)	John de Botetourt, 2nd Baron Botetourt	1324	1385	
Baron Boteler of Wemme (1308)	Elizabeth Le Boteler, de jure Baroness Boteler of Wemme	1361	1411	Her husband was summoned to Parliament, probably in her right
Baron Zouche of Haryngworth (1308)	William la Zouche, 2nd Baron Zouche	1352	1382	
Baron Beaumont (1309)	John Beaumont, 4th Baron Beaumont	1369	1396	
Baron Everingham (1309)	Adam Everingham, 2nd Baron Everingham	1341	1379	Died, Barony fell into abeyance
Baron Monthermer (1309)	Margaret de Monthermer, suo jure Baroness Monthermer	1340	1390	
Baron Strange of Blackmere (1309)	John le Strange, 5th Baron Strange of Blackmere	1361	1375	
Baron Strange of Blackmere (1309)	Elizabeth le Strange, suo jure Baroness Strange of Blackmere	1375	1383	
Baron Lisle (1311)	Robert de Lisle, 3rd Baron Lisle	1356	1399	
Baron Audley of Heleigh (1313)	James de Audley, 2nd Baron Audley of Heleigh	1316	1386	
Baron Cobham of Kent (1313)	John de Cobham, 3rd Baron Cobham of Kent	1355	1408	
Baron Northwode (1313)	John de Northwode, 3rd Baron Northwode	1361	1378	Died, none of his heirs were summoned to Parliament in respect of this Barony
Baron Saint Amand (1313)	Almaric de St Amand, 2nd Baron Saint Amand	1330	1382	
Baron Cherleton (1313)	John Cherleton, 3rd Baron Cherleton	1360	1374	
Baron Cherleton (1313)	John Cherleton, 4th Baron Cherleton	1374	1401	
Baron Say (1313)	William de Say, 3rd Baron Say	1359	1375	Died
Baron Say (1313)	John de Say, 4th Baron Say	1375	1382	
Baron Willoughby de Eresby (1313)	John de Willoughby, 3rd Baron Willoughby de Eresby	1349	1372	Died
Baron Willoughby de Eresby (1313)	Robert Willoughby, 4th Baron Willoughby de Eresby	1372	1396	
Baron Holand (1314)	Robert de Holland, 2nd Baron Holand	1328	1373	Died
Baron Holand (1314)	Maud de Holland, suo jure Baroness Holand	1373	1420	
Baron Audley (1317)	Hugh de Stafford, 3rd Baron Audley	c. 1351	1386	Succeeded as Earl of Stafford in 1372, see above
Baron Strabolgi (1318)	David Strabolgi, 3rd Baron Strabolgi	1335	1375	Died, Barony fell into abeyance
Baron Dacre (1321)	Ralph Dacre, 3rd Baron Dacre	1361	1375	Died
Baron Dacre (1321)	Hugh Dacre, 4th Baron Dacre	1375	1383	
Baron FitzHugh (1321)	Hugh FitzHugh, 2nd Baron FitzHugh	1356	1386	
Baron Greystock (1321)	Ralph de Greystock, 3rd Baron Greystock	1358	1417	
Baron Aton (1324)	William de Aton, 2nd Baron Aton	1342	1373	Died, Barony fell into abeyance
Baron Grey of Ruthin (1325)	Reginald Grey, 2nd Baron Grey de Ruthyn	1353	1388	
Baron Harington (1326)	Robert Harington, 3rd Baron Harington	1363	1406	
Baron Burghersh (1330)	Elizabeth de Burghersh, 3rd Baroness Burghersh	1369	1409	
Baron Maltravers (1330)	in abeyance	1364	1377	
Baron Maltravers (1330)	Eleanor Maltravers, 2nd Baroness Maltravers	1377	1405	
Baron Darcy de Knayth (1332)	Philip Darcy, 4th Baron Darcy de Knayth	1362	1398	
Baron Talbot (1332)	Gilbert Talbot, 3rd Baron Talbot	1356	1387	
Baron Leyburn (1337)	John de Leyburn, 1st Baron Leyburn	1337	1384	
Baron Poynings (1337)	Thomas de Poynings, 3rd Baron Poynings	1369	1375	Died
Baron Poynings (1337)	Richard Poynings, 4th Baron Poynings	1375	1387	
Baron Grey of Rotherfield (1330)	John de Grey, 2nd Baron Grey of Rotherfield	1360	1375	Died
Baron Grey of Rotherfield (1330)	Bartholomew de Grey, 3rd Baron Grey of Rotherfield	1375	1376	Died
Baron Grey of Rotherfield (1330)	Robert de Grey, 4th Baron Grey of Rotherfield	1376	1388	
Baron Cobham of Sterborough (1342)	Reginald de Cobham, 2nd Baron Cobham of Sterborough	1361	1403	
Baron Bourchier (1342)	John Bourchier, 2nd Baron Bourchier	1349	1400	
Baron Colevill (1342)	Robert de Colvill, 2nd Baron Colvill	1368	1370	Died, title fell into abeyance
Baron Montacute (1342)	Joan de Ufford, suo jure Baroness Montacute	1361	1375	Died, Barony extinct
Baron Strivelyn (1342)	John de Strivelyn, 1st Baron Strivelyn	1342	1378	Died, title extinct
Baron Manny (1347)	Walter Manny, 1st Baron Manny	1347	1371	Died
Baron Manny (1347)	Anne Manny, 2nd Baroness Manny	1371	1384	
Baron Bryan (1350)	Guy Bryan, 1st Baron Bryan	1350	1390	
Baron Burnell (1350)	Nicholas Burnell, 1st Baron Burnell	1350	1383	
Baron Scrope of Masham (1350)	Henry Scrope, 1st Baron Scrope of Masham	1350	1391	
Baron Musgrave (1350)	Thomas Musgrave, 1st Baron Musgrave	1350	1382	
Baron Huntingfield (1351)	William de Huntingfield, 1st Baron Huntingfield	1351	1376	Died, title extinct
Baron Saint Maur (1351)	Richard St Maur, 3rd Baron Saint Maur	1361	1401	
Baron le Despencer (1357)	Edward le Despencer, 1st Baron le Despencer	1357	1375	Died
Baron le Despencer (1357)	Thomas le Despenser, 2nd Baron le Despencer	1375	1400	
Baron Lisle (1357)	Warine de Lisle, 2nd Baron Lisle	1360	1382	
Baron Montacute (1357)	John de Montacute, 1st Baron Montacute	1357	1390	
Baron Beauchamp of Bletso (1363)	Roger Beauchamp, 1st Baron Beauchamp of Bletso	1363	1380	
Baron Botreaux (1368)	William de Botreaux, 1st Baron Botreaux	1368	1391	
Baron Aldeburgh (1371)	William de Aldeburgh, 1st Baron Aldeburgh	1371	1388	New creation
Baron Heron (1371)	William Heron, 1st Baron Heron	1371	?	New creation; died, title extinct
Baron Scrope of Bolton (1371)	Richard le Scrope, 1st Baron Scrope of Bolton	1371	1403	New creation
Baron Cromwell (1375)	Ralph de Cromwell, 1st Baron Cromwell	1375	1398	New creation
Baron Clifton (1376)	John de Clifton, 1st Baron Clifton	1376	1388	New creation
Baron Arundel (1377)	John FitzAlan, 1st Baron Arundel	1377	1379	New creation; died, none of his heirs were summoned to Parliament in respect of this Barony

== Peerage of Scotland ==
Title	Holder	Date gained	Date lost	Notes
Earl of Mar (1114)	Thomas, Earl of Mar	1332	1377	Died
Earl of Mar (1114)	Margaret, Countess of Mar	1377	1393	
Earl of Dunbar (1115)	George I, Earl of March	1368	1420	
Earl of Fife (1129)	Isabella, Countess of Fife	1353	1371	Died
Earl of Fife (1129)	Robert Stewart, Earl of Fife	1371	1420	
Earl of Menteith (1160)	Margaret Graham, Countess of Menteith	1360	1390	
Earl of Lennox (1184)	Domhnall, Earl of Lennox	1333	1373	Died
Earl of Lennox (1184)	Margaret, Countess of Lennox	1373	1385	
Earl of Ross (1215)	Uilleam III, Earl of Ross	1334	1372	Died
Earl of Ross (1215)	Euphemia I, Countess of Ross	1372	1394	
Earl of Sutherland (1235)	William de Moravia, 5th Earl of Sutherland	1333	1370	Died
Earl of Sutherland (1235)	Robert de Moravia, 6th Earl of Sutherland	1370	1427	
Earl of Angus (1330)	Thomas Stewart, 3rd Earl of Angus	1361	1377	Died
Earl of Angus (1330)	Margaret Stewart, Countess of Angus	1361	1389	
Earl of Wigtown (1341)	Thomas Fleming, Earl of Wigtown	1363	1372	Disposed of the Earldom
Earl of Atholl (1342)	Robert Stewart, 1st Earl of Atholl	1342	1371	Succeeded to the Throne, and his dignities merged in the Crown
Earl of Douglas (1358)	William Douglas, 1st Earl of Douglas	1358	1384	
Earl of Carrick (1368)	John Stewart, Earl of Carrick	1368	1390	
Earl of Strathearn (1371)	David Stewart, Earl of Strathearn	1371	1386	New creation; cr. Earl of Caithness in 1375
Earl of Moray (1372)	John Dunbar, Earl of Moray	1372	1391	New creation
Earl of Orkney (1379)	Henry I Sinclair, Earl of Orkney	1379	1400	New creation

== Peerage of Ireland ==
Title	Holder	Date gained	Date lost	Notes
Earl of Ulster (1264)	Philippa, 5th Countess of Ulster	1363	1382	
Earl of Kildare (1316)	Maurice FitzGerald, 4th Earl of Kildare	1329	1390	
Earl of Ormond (1328)	James Butler, 2nd Earl of Ormond	1338	1382	
Earl of Desmond (1329)	Gerald FitzGerald, 3rd Earl of Desmond	1358	1398	
Baron Athenry (1172)	Thomas de Bermingham	1322	1374	Died
Baron Athenry (1172)	Walter de Bermingham	1374	1428	
Baron Kingsale (1223)	John de Courcy, 8th Baron Kingsale	1358	1387	
Baron Kerry (1223)	Maurice Fitzmaurice, 6th Baron Kerry	1348	1398	
Baron Barry (1261)	David Barry, 6th Baron Barry	1347	1392	
Baron Gormanston (1370)	Robert Preston, 1st Baron Gormanston	1370	1396	New creation
Baron Slane (1370)	Simon Fleming, 1st Baron Slane	1370	1370	New creation; died
Baron Slane (1370)	Thomas Fleming, 2nd Baron Slane	1370	1435	

Preceded by List of peers 1360–1369	Lists of peers by decade 1370–1379	Succeeded by List of peers 1380–1389
