= Ayton Castle, North Yorkshire =

Ruined castle in North Yorkshire, England

Ayton Castle
- West Ayton, North Yorkshire, England
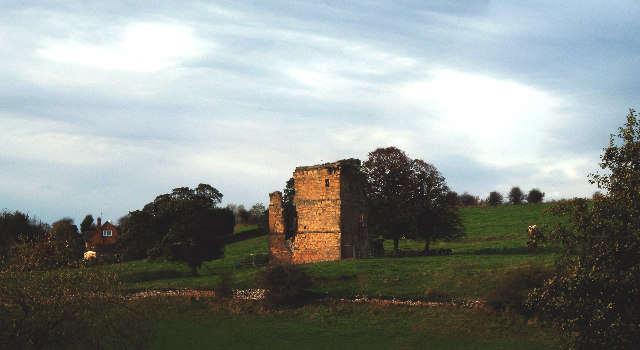
- Ayton Castle ruins

Site information
- Condition: Ruined

Location
- Coordinates: 54°15′07″N 0°29′08″W

Ayton Castle is a ruined Grade I listed 14th century pele tower castle near West Ayton, North Yorkshire, England.

== Location ==
The castle is sited at the southeast edge of the North York Moors National Park, on rising ground near the main fording point of the River Derwent. It is close to the A170 road, a main road between Thirsk and Scarborough that runs along the park's south edge.

== History ==
A fortified manor house or castle existed on the site from the 12th century. In the 13th century the occupiers were the de Aton family, who gained their name from the village of West Ayton, which is listed in the Domesday book as "Atune". The area came under regular attack from Scottish raiders, and stronger fortification was required. The pele castle was built by Ralph Eure of Witton in the late 14th century, after inheriting the lands through marriage to the co-heiress Katherine de Aton, daughter of William de Aton, 2nd Baron Aton. The castle became known as the "Defender of the Dales" The castle was abandoned in the late 17th century and became ruinous. Most of the structure below ground has remained intact, including a twin-tunnel vault.

The ruined site was Grade I listed on 18 January 1967. It is a rare example of this type of castle in Northern England. The site is closed to the public but the castle can be seen from a nearby field.

== Architecture ==
The castle is around 21 metres (69 ft) by 13.5 metres (44 ft). It originally had three stories, each one offset with a chamfered string course. The ruin includes the remains of a peel tower constructed of sandstone.

== See also ==
- Grade I listed buildings in North Yorkshire (district)
- Listed buildings in West Ayton
