= Ayton Castle =

Ayton Castle may refer to the following castles in the United Kingdom:

- Ayton Castle, North Yorkshire, located near West Ayton, North Yorkshire, England
- Ayton Castle, Scottish Borders, located to the east of Ayton in the Scottish Borders, Scotland
