= Listed buildings in West Ayton =

West Ayton is a civil parish in the county of North Yorkshire, England. It contains nine listed buildings that are recorded in the National Heritage List for England. Of these, one is listed at Grade I, the highest of the three grades, and the others are at Grade II, the lowest grade. The village contains the village of West Ayton and the surrounding area. Most of the listed buildings are houses, and the others consist of a ruined fortified tower and a watermill.

== Key ==
Grade	Criteria
I	Buildings of exceptional interest, sometimes considered to be internationally important
II	Buildings of national importance and special interest

== Buildings ==
Name and location	Photograph	Date	Notes	Grade
Ayton Castle; 54.25201°N 0.48558°W		14th century	A fortified tower, now in ruins, in sandstone on a chamfered plinth. It has a rectangular plan and three storeys, each storey off-set with a chamfered string course. It contains a pointed doorway flanked by square-headed window openings in chamfered quoined surrounds. There is surviving machicolation on the east corner. In the ground floor are depressed pointed tunnel vaults supported on chamfered transverse ribs, and there are staircases within the walls.	I
Low Hall; 54.24497°N 0.48644°W	—	Late 17th century	The house is rendered and has a pantile roof. There are two storeys, three bays, and a rear wing. In the centre is a gabled porch, and a basket-arched doorway with a chamfered surround, fluted pilasters, with ball mouldings, and an open pediment. There is one earlier sash window, and the others date from the 20th century.	II
House north of Low Yedmandale Farmhouse; 54.25641°N 0.49769°W	—	Late 17th century	The house is in sandstone with a pantile roof. There one storey and an attic, two bays, and a single-storey rear range. Some windows are mullioned, some blocked, and the others are horizontally sliding sashes.	II
The Elms; 54.24931°N 0.48850°W	—	18th century	The house is in sandstone, with quoins, and a concrete tile roof with coped gables and shaped kneelers. There are two storeys and an attic, a double depth plan, and a front of five bays. The doorway has panelled pilasters, a patterned fanlight, and a cornice on scroll brackets. Most of the windows are sashes, at the rear is a round-headed stair window, and there are round-headed attic windows on the gable ends.	II
High Hall; 54.24936°N 0.48682°W	—	1784–86	The house is in red brick on a stone plinth, and has a pantile roof, with slate on the wings, coped gables and shaped kneelers. The garden front has a coved eaves course, two storeys and three bays. In the centre is a doorway with panelled jambs, a radial fanlight, and a pediment on brackets. It is flanked by bow windows, and the upper floor has sash windows with flat gauged brick arches. The street front has two storeys and attics, four bays, and is flanked by projecting wings. On the right is a segmental coach arch, the windows are sashes, those on the ground floor with segmental arches, and there is a single attic dormer.	II
Candler House; 54.24487°N 0.48640°W	—	c. 1790	Originally an extension to Low Hall, it is in rose brick, rendered on the front, with stone dressings, and a pantile roof with coped gables and shaped kneelers. There are two storeys and two bays. On the left is a doorway with fluted Ionic pilasters, a radial fanlight, friezes with rosettes and ball moulding, and an open pediment. To its right is a semicircular bay window, and on the upper floor are sash windows with raised wedge lintels.	II
High Mill; 54.25030°N 0.48559°W		c. 1800	The watermill is in sandstone, with quoins, and a slate] roof with coped gables. There are three storeys, three bays, and flanking lean-tos. In the centre is a doorway with a divided fanlight, the windows are pivoting, and all the openings have heavy lintels and quoined jambs. In the centre of the top floor is a recessed panel containing a coat of arms. The left lean-to has two cart openings, and the right lean-to housed the waterwheel.	II
Burton House; 54.24767°N 0.48657°W	—	Early 19th century	The house is in sandstone, and has a tile roof with coped gables. There are two storeys, three bays, a rear wing, and a later lean-to on the left. The central doorway has attached fluted Doric columns, a fanlight, and an entablature, and the windows are sashes.	II
Yedmandale Terrace; 54.25046°N 0.48792°W	—	1830–40	A terrace of five houses stepped up a slope, in sandstone with quoins and a hipped slate roof. There are two storeys and nine bays. The doorways have divided fanlights, and one house has a doorcase with panelled pilasters and an entablature. There is one modern casement window, and the other windows are sashes.	II
