= John Conyers (died 1396) =

English noble

Alleged arms of John Conyers.

Sir John Conyers (Note: Surname also shown as Coigniers and Coniers) (died 1396) of Sockburn, Durham was an English land owner and knight.

Conyers was a younger son of Roger Conyers and Alice de Faye. John was heir to his brother Geoffrey. He died in 1396 and was buried in Grey Friars, York. His wife Elizabeth died in 1402.

== Marriage and issue ==
He married Elizabeth, the widow of William Playce, she was the youngest daughter and co-heiress of William Aton and Isabel Percy. They had the following issue:

- Elizabeth Conyers, married firstly Henry Boynton and secondly John Felton.
- Robert Conyers (died 1431), married Isabel Pert.
