= Gilbert Aton =

English magnate

Sir Gilbert Aton (died after 10 April 1350), of West Ayton in Yorkshire, was an English landowner, soldier and administrator.

== Origins ==
Born before 1289, he was the son and heir of William Aton (died before 1308), of West Ayton, and his wife Isabel, daughter of Sir Simon Vere, of Goxhill and Sproatley, and his wife Ada Bertram.

== Career ==
Alleged arms of Gilbert Aton, as displayed in the Boroughbridge Roll (attributed to a tournament during the siege of Berwick in 1319)

Involved from an early age in the wars of King Edward I against the Scots, he was knighted in 1306, on the same day as the future King Edward II, who in 1308 granted him free warren in his inherited lands at Barlby, South Holme and North Holme, Welham in Malton, and Knapton.

When the last Baron Vescy, was killed at the battle of Bannockburn in 1314, he was recognised as heir to his lands at Langton, Wintringham and Malton. The relationship was remote, Vescy being his second cousin twice removed. Part of Vescy's lands went to Antony Bek, the bishop of Durham, including Alnwick Castle which he obtained from the bishop and sold to Henry Percy, 2nd Baron Percy, whose daughter Isabel was married to his son.

As a warrior and landowner on the fringes of the aristocracy, he was summoned three times to the King's Council, in 1324, 1325 and in 1342. He made his will on 10 April 1350, naming as heir his son, to whom he had already transferred some if not all of his property, and asking to be buried at Watton Priory.

== Family ==
The name of his wife has not survived and his only known child was his son William Aton.
