= John de Verdon, 1st Baron Verdon =

Anglo-Norman Baron

Baron Verdon Sir John de Verdon
- Born: John de Verdon; 24 June 1299
- Died: aft. 23 October 1376

Sir John de Verdon (1299 - 1376) was the 2nd son and eventual heir of Sir Thomas de Verdon, Lord of Brixworth in Northamptonshire and Bressingham in Norfolk, and his wife Margaret, daughter of Bewes otherwise Bogo de Knovill, 1st Baron Knovill. His main residence was initially at Bressingham, then later at Martlesham in Suffolk. In 1324, he was returned as a knight to attend the Great Council at Westminster. He is cited as being on the King's service in Aquitaine in June 1324. He was summoned to Parliament as a Baron by Writ 1331/1332, 1335/1336 and to the Great Councils in 1342 and 1347. In 1346, during the Crecy campaign, he served in the 1st Division under Prince of Wales 'the Black Prince', who gave him a destrier called Grisel de Coloign. However, illness necessitated his return to England sometime before 12 January 1346/7. In 1369 he attended Parliament as a Knight of Northamptonshire, although he had been created a Baron before then. He married firstly Agnes, and secondly Maud, the widow of Ralph de Crophull of Bonnington, Nottinghamshire, whose son Sir John de Crophull married Margery, daughter of Sir John de Verdon's kinsman, Theobald de Verdun, 2nd Baron Verdun of Alton Castle.

Sir John and Maud had two known children:

- Edmund de Verdon, who died before his father and without issue.
- Margaret de Verdon, who after the death of her father became de jure suo jure Baroness Verdon. She married 1stly Sir Hugh de Bradshagh of Old Hall, Westleigh, Lancashire and 2ndly Sir John Pilkington of Pilkington, also Lancashire. Cokayne in his Complete Peerage presented her as the daughter of Edmund de Verdun in error; he was actually her brother.

Sir John married 3rdly Isabel, daughter of Sir Thomas Vise de Lou. Knight of Shelfhanger. He died c.1380, the year Probate was granted on the estate of John de Verdon miles of Schelfangr. His widow Isabel married Sir Edmund Noon, as confirmed in the Inquisition Post Mortem of William de Ufford, Earl of Suffolk (1382, 10 March, 5 Richard II), which refers to Edmund Noon and his wife, late the wife of John Verdon.
