= Baron Arcedekne =

Arms of Arcedekne: Argent, three chevronels sable These are also the arms of the French commune of Erchin in northern France

Baron Arcedekne (alias l'Arcedekne, Lercedeakne, Archdekne, Archdeacon, etc.) was a peerage created in 1321 for Thomas Arcedekne, 1st Baron Arcedekne (d.1331) of Ruan Lanihorne Castle in Cornwall, Governor of Tintagel Castle in 1312 and Sheriff of Cornwall 1313–14, who was summoned by writ to Parliament in 1321, whereby he became Baron Arcedekne. His descendants were never again summoned to Parliament in respect of the barony, and The Complete Peerage does not list them as holders of that peerage and considers the barony to be abeyant. His descendants were:

- Sir John Arcedekne (1306-c.1377) of Ruan Lanihorne in Cornwall, eldest son and heir, who married Cecily de Haccombe, heiress of Haccombe in Devon. He fought in France in 1345. He was a cousin of his wife Cecily de Haccombe, "within the fourth degree of consanguinity", and therefore in 1327 obtained a papal dispensation for the marriage to proceed. By Cecily de Haccombe he had (in the words of Risdon (died 1640)) "A fruitful progeny especially of issue male". However, of his nine sons only two left children, namely Sir Warin Arcedekne, second son and eventual heir; and the third son Richard Arcedekne whose son Richard Arcedekne died childless.
- Ralph (or Stephen) Arcedekne (d.1377), eldest son and heir, who died very shortly after his father, without issue;
- Sir Warin Arcedekne (d.1400), younger brother of Ralph (or Stephen) Arcedekne, also of Ruan Lanihorn, Cornwall, a Member of Parliament for Cornwall in 1380 and 1382, who married Elizabeth Talbot (d.1407), a daughter of Sir John Talbot of Richard's Castle in Herefordshire and a co-heiress of her brother John Talbot (d.1388). By his marriage he acquired extensive estates in six other counties. He left no sons, only four daughters and co-heiresses:
  - Eleanor Arcedekne, wife of Sir Walter Lucy of Dallington, Northamptonshire and Cublington, Buckinghamshire.
  - Phillipa Arcedekne, eventual heiress of Haccombe, the second wife of Sir Hugh Courtenay (c. 1358–1425).
  - Margery Arcedekne (d.1420), wife of Thomas Arundell (d.1443), of Tolverne in Philleigh, Cornwall (2nd son of John Arundell (1366–1435), The Magnificent, of Lanherne) four times a Member of Parliament for Cornwall.
  - Elizabeth Arcedekne, wife of Otto Trevarthian, a son of John Trevarthian (c.1360-1402), of Trevarthian in St Hilary, Cornwall, MP.
