= Maurice le Brun, 1st Baron Brun =

English peer

Maurice le Brun, 1st Baron Brun (bef. 1279 – 17 March 1354/1355) was an English peer, born in Essex.

Sir Maurice le Brun was the son of William le Brun of Ranston, Dorset, of Rowner, Hampshire, and of Fordingbridge, Hampshire, who died circa 4 March 1300/1301, and wife Isolde, family unknown, who died circa 6 September 1307.

He married before 14 October 1300 Maud de la Rokele, whom he survived, born in Ireland on 9 October 1286 the daughter of Philip de la Rokele of Beckenham, Kent, and of South Ockendon, Essex, and wife Joan, family unknown. On 26 June 1301 she and her husband had livery of her father's lands.

He was summoned to Parliament as Baron Brun, and thus by modern usage is held to have become a member of the Peerage of England, by writ of 8 January 1313, although his descendants were not summoned to Parliament by this writ.

Their son Sir William le Bruyn (before 1315 – 24 February 1361/1362) eventually inherited South Ockendon, Essex, and married Alice le Lacer, daughter of Richard le Lacer. Their grandson Sir Ingram Bruyn (Titchfield, Hampshire, 6 December 1353 – 12 August 1400, buried South Ockendon, Essex) also inherited South Ockendon, Essex, and married Elizabeth de la Pole (14 July 1362 – 14 December 1403), daughter of Edmund de la Pole. Their son was Maurice Bruyn who died in 1466, when any hereditary barony that may be held to have been created by the writ of 1313 fell into abeyance.

His widow remarried on 6 February 1362/1363 Sir Robert de Marny of Layer Marney, Essex. They separated on 12 July 1365 and he died after 25 September 1394.

Peerage of England
Preceded by New creation	Baron Brun; 1315–1354/1355	Succeeded by Dormant
