= West Ayton =

Village and civil parish in North Yorkshire, England

Coordinates: 54.247°N 0.487°W

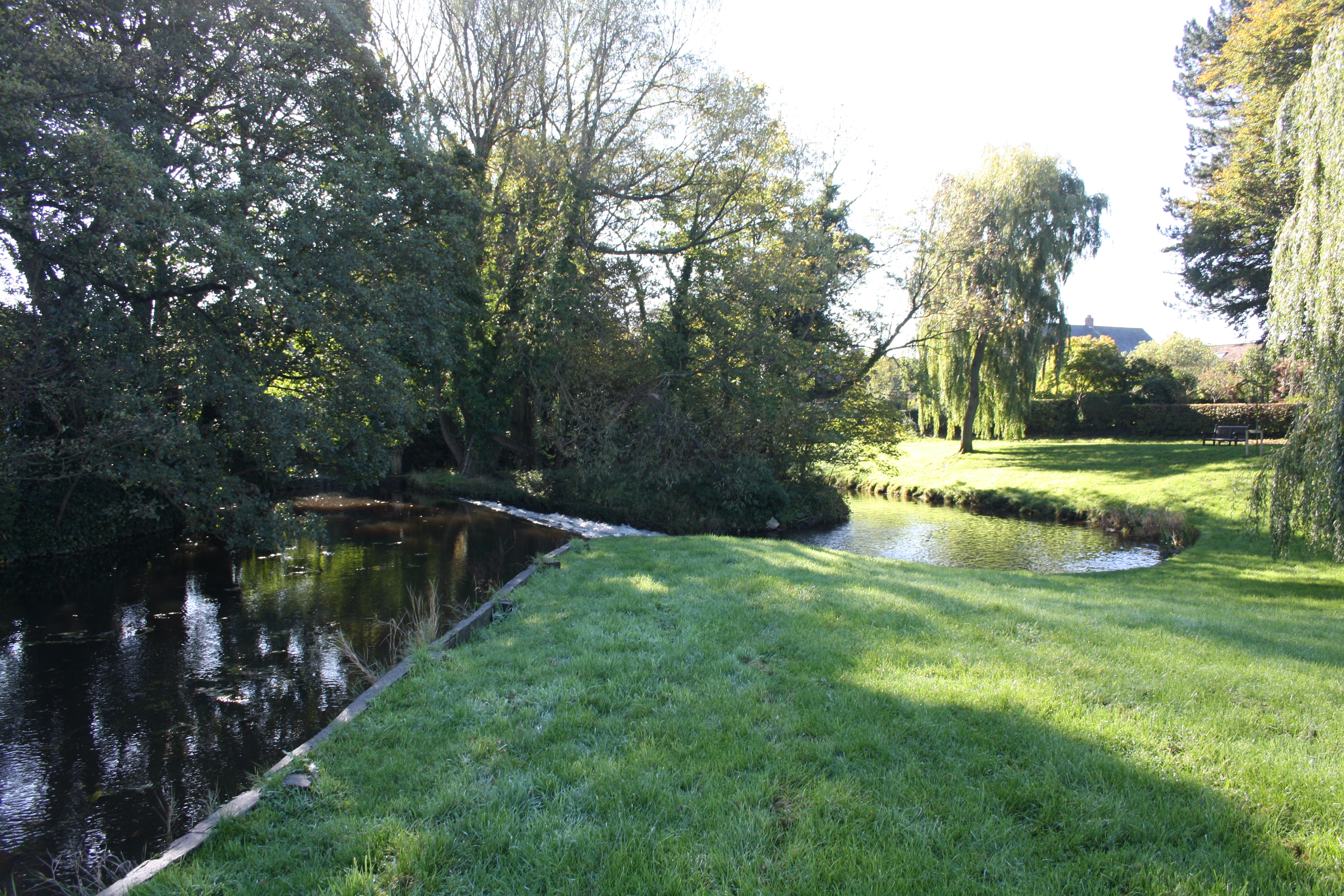
- Low Mill weir on the River Derwent

- Location within North Yorkshire
- Population: 881 (2011 census)
- OS grid reference: SE986847
- Civil parish: West Ayton
- Unitary authority: North Yorkshire
- Ceremonial county: North Yorkshire
- Region: Yorkshire and the Humber
- Country: England
- Sovereign state: United Kingdom
- Post town: SCARBOROUGH
- Postcode district: YO13
- Police: North Yorkshire
- Fire: North Yorkshire
- Ambulance: Yorkshire
- UK Parliament: Scarborough and Whitby

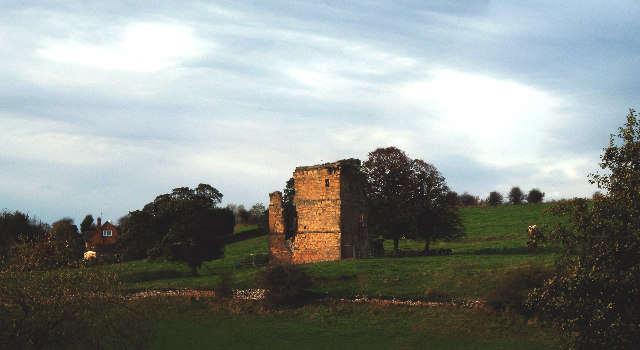
The 14th century Ayton Castle, between East Ayton and West Ayton

West Ayton is a village and civil parish in the county of North Yorkshire, England, located upon the west bank of the River Derwent adjacent to East Ayton.

According to the 2011 UK census, West Ayton parish had a population of 881, an increase on the 2001 UK census figure of 831.

From 1974 to 2023 it was part of the Borough of Scarborough. It is now administered by the unitary North Yorkshire Council.

The name Ayton derives from the Old English ēatūn meaning 'settlement on a river'.

The ruins of Ayton Castle can be found to the west of the village. The tower dates back to 1390 and was built by Ralph Eure. During the 1670s, stone from the castle was used to rebuild the bridge over the River Derwent.

Just south of the village is the Wykeham Lakes park. This is a fishery and water-sports complex run by the Downe family's Dawnay Estates programme. The lakes are built on the site of a former First World War Royal Flying Corps airfield (known as West Ayton) which was used by No. 251 Squadron. The airfield was abandoned after 1919.

== See also ==
- Listed buildings in West Ayton
