= Baron Musgrave =

Barony in the Peerage of England

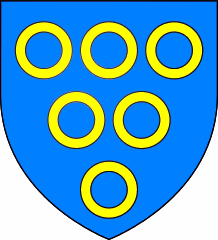
Arms of Musgrave of Musgrave, Hartley and Edenhall in Cumberland: Azure, six annulets three, two, one, or These are differences of the arms of Vipont, the powerful Westmorland family and overlords whose many feudal tenants and followers adopted for arms variants of Vipont

The title of Baron Musgrave was created once in the Peerage of England. On 25 November 1350 Thomas Musgrave was summoned to parliament. He was imprisoned in 1381/2, when '[t]he Barony was possibly considered as forfeited'. He died after 1382.

== Baron Musgrave (1350) ==
- Thomas Musgrave, 1st Baron Musgrave (d. a. 1382) (forfeit? 1381/2)
