= Thomas Ughtred, 1st Baron Ughtred =

English soldier nobleman and politician

Thomas Ughtred
- Baron Ughtred
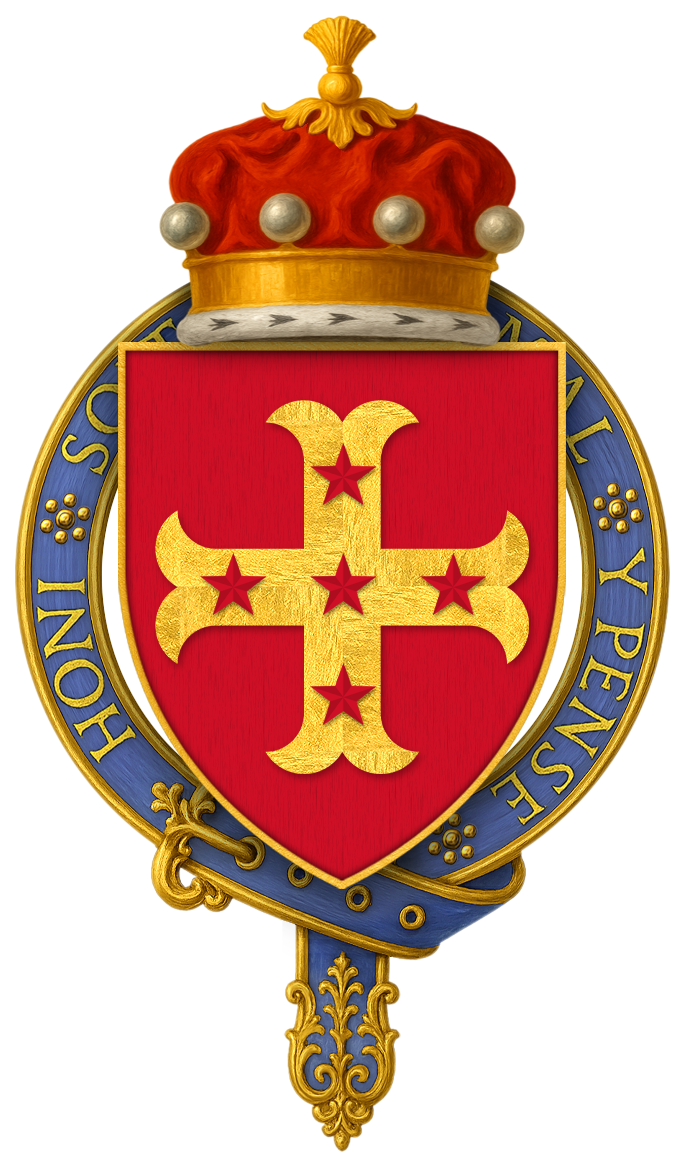
- Arms of Sir Thomas Ughtred, 1st Baron Ughtred, KG
- Born: 1292; Scarborough, North Yorkshire
- Died: Before 28 May 1365 (aged 72–73)
- Buried: Catton Church, Catton, North Yorkshire
- Noble family: Ughtred
- Spouse: Margaret Burdon
- Issue: Sir Thomas Ughtred
- Father: Robert Ughtred
- Mother: Isabel de Steeton

Thomas Ughtred, 1st Baron Ughtred (also Oughtred; Outred), KG (1292 – before 28 May 1365) was an English soldier and politician. The eldest son and heir of Robert Ughtred, lord of the manor of Scarborough, Kilnwick Percy, Monkton Moor, and other places in Yorkshire. He was born in 1292, being eighteen years of age at his father's death, before 24 May 1310. During a distinguished career he was knighted in 1324, made a Knight banneret in 1337, a Knight of the garter between 15 May 1358 and 1360, and summoned to parliament as Baron Ughtred on 30 April 1344.

== Marriage and issue ==
He married before January 1328 – 1329, Margaret Burdon, daughter of Brian Burdon of Kexby, North Yorkshire and his wife, Isabel, daughter of Sir John de Meaux, of Gowthorpe, Yorkshire. They had a son:

- Thomas Ughtred, before 24 Nov 1329 – 18 November 1401, married twice:

- Catherine Mauley, died 25 November 1402, by whom he had a son:

- William, died before 19 September 1398, married and had a son:

- Thomas, born before July 1384, died before 2 December 1411, married Margaret, daughter of Sir John Goddard.

- Idonea L'Engleys.

== Career ==
On 8 June 1319 he was appointed commissioner of array for Yorkshire, an office which he frequently filled during Edward II's reign. In October 1319 he served at the siege of Berwick, in command of forty-four hobelars, or light horse.

On 6 October 1320 he was returned to parliament as knight of the shire for his county. He sided with the king against Thomas of Lancaster, and on 14 March 1322 was empowered to arrest any of the earl's adherents. In the same year he was made constable of Pickering Castle. He was taken prisoner by the Scots at the Battle of Old Byland and in the following March went to Scotland to release his hostages. In the same month he was granted the custody of the manor of Bentele, Yorkshire, during the minority of Payn de Tibetot or Tiptoft. He attended a great council held at Westminster in June 1324, and was knighted in the same year. On 14 April 1328 he was placed on a commission of oyer and terminer, and in 1330 and 1331–2 again represented Yorkshire in parliament.

Edward III confirmed the grants made to Ughtred, and in 1331 placed him on the commissions of the peace between the River Ouse and the River Derwent, and in the North Riding of Yorkshire. In 1332 he acquired a house and garden called Le Whitehalle in Berwick, and in the same year he accompanied Edward Balliol on his invasion of Scotland. The expedition landed at Kinghorn and defeated the Earl of Fife at Dupplin Moor on 12 August. Ughtred was apparently present at Balliol's coronation at Scone on 24 September, and sat in the Scottish parliament as Baron of Innerwick. On 20 October Balliol granted him the manor of Bonkill, which was confirmed by Edward III on 19 June 1334.

In the summer of 1334 the Scots rose against Balliol, who sent Ughtred to Edward with a request for help. Balliol was, however, driven out of Scotland, and during the retreat Ughtred held the bridge at Roxburgh against the Scots and secured Balliol's retreat. In the same year he was made a knight-banneret. In 1338 Edward III required Balliol to entrust the command of Perth, threatened with a siege by Robert the Steward, to Ughtred. He took over the command on 4 August, on condition that he was given a garrison of 220 men in time of peace and eight hundred in time of war. These conditions were not kept, however, and early in 1339 Ughtred petitioned the English government to be relieved of his charge. He was urged to remain until the arrival of reinforcements, but these were not despatched in time, and on 16 August 1339 Ughtred was compelled to surrender. This led to aspersions on his courage, and he complained to parliament at Westminster. His explanations were held sufficient, and in April 1340 the grant of Bonkill, which of course by that time was in the hands of the Scots, was confirmed to him.

In the following year, Ughtred was attached to Robert III of Artois's expedition against France. Siege was laid to Saint-Omer, and on 26 July 1340 the French attacked the Flemings and would have raised the siege had not Ughtred with his archers restored the fortunes of the day. He was again summoned to serve against the French on 13 May 1347; on 14 June 1352 he was appointed warden of the sea coast of Yorkshire, and on 16 April 1360 he again received protection on crossing the seas on the king's service.

Ughtred is said to have received summonses to parliament from 30 April 1344 to 4 December 1364, and is accordingly regarded as a peer. However, in 1357 he was referred to as "Thomas Ughtred, knight, the elder" and in 1360 he was styled simply "chivaler"; none of his descendants were summoned to parliament, and it has been suggested that he represented Yorkshire in the House of Commons in 1344 and 1352.

== Death and descendants ==
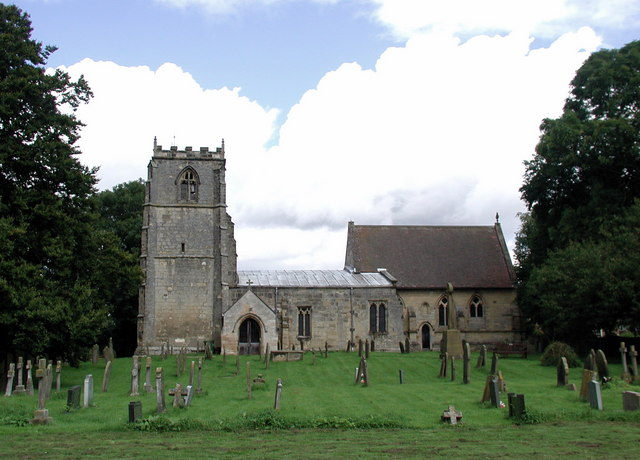
All Saints Church, Low Catton, East Riding of Yorkshire, England

Sir Thomas Ughtred died before 28 May in 1365 and was buried in Catton church. He was succeeded by his son, Thomas, who by then had been knighted.

Sir Thomas Ughtred owned vast estates in Yorkshire. He was constable of Lochmaben Castle in 1376–7 and served against the French in 1377 and 1379. In 1383 his name appears in the retinue of the Earl of Northumberland, then Governor of Berwick-upon-Tweed. He died 18 November 1401, having outlived his son and heir, William.

William Ughtred married Catherine, daughter of Peter, Lord Mauley and his first wife, Margaret Clifford, and by her had a son, Thomas, who subsequently became his grandfather's heir. Neither he nor any of his descendants were ever summoned to parliament.

Anthony Ughtred (d. 1534), a later member of the family, took a prominent part in the French and Scots wars of Henry VIII. During 1513–14 he was marshal of Tournai after its capture from the French, and from February 1515 to August 1532 he was captain of Berwick. He was subsequently appointed governor of Jersey, and held that office till his death in 1534. His widow, Elizabeth Seymour, daughter of Sir John Seymour and sister of Jane Seymour, third wife of Henry VIII married Gregory Cromwell, 1st Baron Cromwell, eldest son of Thomas Cromwell.

== Bibliography ==
- Ayton, Andrew (2008). "Ughtred, Thomas, first Lord Ughtred (1291/2–1365)". Oxford Dictionary of National Biography (online ed.). Oxford University Press. doi:10.1093/ref:odnb/27980. (Subscription, Wikipedia Library access or UK public library membership required.)
- Beltz, George Frederick (1841). "Thomas Lord Ughtred". Memorials of the Most Noble Order of the Garter From Its Foundation to the Present Time, Including the History of the Order; Biographical Notices of the Knights in the Reigns of Edward III and Richard II; the Chronological Succession of the Members, and Many Curious Particulars Relating to the English and French History from Hitherto Unpublished Documents. London: William Pickering. pp. 107–110.
- Cokayne, G. E. (1898). Complete Peerage of England, Scotland, Ireland, Great Britain and United Kingdom, Extant, Extinct, or Dormant. Vol. VIII. London: George Bell & Sons.
- Lyte, H. C. Maxwell, ed. (1908). "Close Rolls, Edward III: May 1357". Calendar of Close Rolls, Edward III: Volume 10: 1354-1360. British-history.ac.uk. pp. 357–364.
- Lyte, H. C. Maxwell, ed. (1910). "Close Rolls, Edward III: May 1365". Calendar of Close Rolls, Edward III: Volume 12: 1364-1369. British-history.ac.uk. pp. 102–125.
- MacMahon, Luke (2004). "Ughtred, Sir Anthony (d. 1534)". Oxford Dictionary of National Biography (online ed.). Oxford University Press. doi:10.1093/ref:odnb/27979. (Subscription, Wikipedia Library access or UK public library membership required.)
- Nicolas, Harris (1857). The Historic Peerage of England. London: John Murray.
- Pollard, Albert Frederick (1899). "Ughtred, Thomas" . In Lee, Sidney (ed.). Dictionary of National Biography. Vol. 58. London: Smith, Elder & Co. p. 15.
- Shaw, W. A. (1906). The Knights of England. Vol. I. London: Sherrat and Hughes.
