= Baron Everingham =

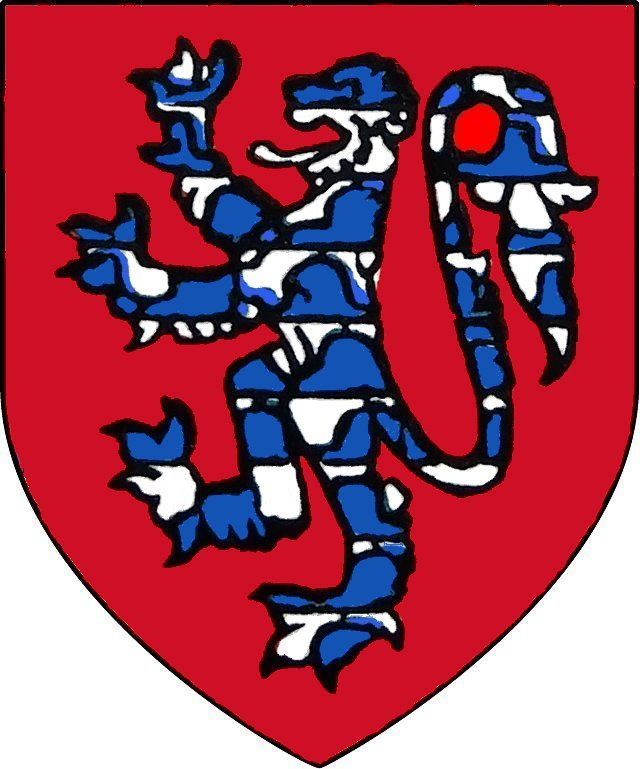
Arms of Baron Everingham:- Gules, a lion rampant vair variation = crowned or

Baron Everingham (a.k.a. Everyngham) is an abeyant title in the Peerage of England. It was created by Writ of summons to Parliament of Adam de Everingham of Laxton, Nottinghamshire, on 4 March 1309. It passed to his son Adam but fell into abeyance upon the death of his childless grandson Robert in 1371.

== Ancestry ==
Named after the village of Everingham, Yorkshire the de Everinghams moved to Laxton in the thirteenth century and subsequently branched out to Kiplingcotes and Sherburn and Lincolnshire. The first of the Laxton Everinghams was Robert de Everingham who married the heiress of the Birkin family and in doing so brought the hereditary position of Keeper of Sherwood Forest to the family. The three generations that preceded the Barons are:-

- Sir Robert de Everingham (died 1236), m. Isabel, daughter of John Birkin, Keeper of Sherwood Forest.
- Sir Adam de Everingham (died 1280), fought in the Welsh War of 1257 and with the Barons at the Battle of Evesham in 1265. Keeper of Sherwood Forest. Held Shelford, Nottinghamshire, Everingham & Fairburn, North Yorkshire and Westbury in Lincolnshire. Inquisition post mortem 1281.
- Sir Robert de Everingham (1256–87), m. Alice de la Hyde. Keeper of Sherwood Forest. Inquisition post mortem 1287.

St Michael the Archangel's Church, Laxton contains stone effigies of the family.

== Baron Everingham of Laxton (1309) ==
By Writ

- Sir Adam de Everingham, 1st Baron Everingham, K.B. (1279–1340). Served in the Invasion of Scotland in 1296 and took part in the Siege of Caerlaverock in 1300. Made Knight of the Bath at the Knighting of Edward II at the Feast of the Swans in 1306. Summoned to Parliament by Writ in 1309. Fought in the Anglo-Scottish Wars from 1295 to 1319. Taken prisoner at Battle of Boroughbridge in 1322. Inquisition post mortem 1341.
- Sir Adam de Everingham, 2nd Baron Everingham (1307–1388), son and heir. m. Joan d'Eyvill. Fought at the Siege of Berwick and Battle of Halidon Hill in 1333, the Battle of Sluys and Siege of Tournay in 1340, the Battle of Crecy in 1346 and the Siege of Calais in 1347. Summoned to Parliament by Writ in January 1371. He died 8 February 1387/88 in Laxton, Northumberland, England.
- Robert de Everingham (b. ~1368) was to become 3rd Baron Everingham, as son of William de Everingham (d. 16 August 1369) and grandson of the 2nd Baron, but died 27 December 1370 in his minority thus the Barony fell into abeyance between his sisters Joan (b. ~1362) and Katherine (b. ~1363) when the 2nd Baron died.

== See also ==
- Ralph fitzStephen
