= Baron Deincourt =

British title of royalty

Baron Deincourt was a title which was created twice in the Peerage of England. The first creation is in abeyance and the second creation was forfeited.

== History ==
The first creation was by writ on 6 February 1299 in the reign of Edward I when Edmund Deincourt was summoned to the House of Lords. It went into abeyance on his death in 1327.

The second creation was on 27 January 1332 in the reign of Edward III when William Deincourt, nephew of the above, was also summoned to Parliament. The title then passed down in the family to William Deincourt, the fifth Baron and went into abeyance on his death in 1422. The fifth baron had two sisters, but when his sister Margaret died without issue the abeyance was terminated in favor of his sister Alice, before passing to her grandson Francis Lovell, 1st Viscount Lovell. The barony was forfeited with Lovell's attainder in 1487.

Baron Deincourt (1299)

- Edmund Deincourt, 1st Baron Deincourt (died 1327)

Baron Deincourt (1332)

- William Deincourt, 1st Baron Deincourt (1301–1364)
- William Deincourt, 2nd Baron Deincourt (1357–1381)
- Ralph Deincourt, 3rd Baron Deincourt (c.1380–1384)
- John Deincourt, 4th Baron Deincourt (1382–1406)
- William Deincourt, 5th Baron Deincourt (1403-1422)

== See also ==
- Baron Deincourt of Sutton
