= William Aton =

- Baron Aton
- Alleged arms of Baron Aton; Barry of six or and azure, on a canton gules, a cross flory argent
- Successor: None
- Born: about 1299
- Died: before March 1389
- Spouse: Isabel Percy
- Issue: William; Anastasia; Elizabeth; Catherine
- Father: Sir Gilbert Aton

Sir William Aton (died before March 1389), sometimes called Baron Aton, of West Ayton, Barlby, South Holme and North Holme, Welham, Langton, Wintringham, Malton and Knapton in Yorkshire, was an English landowner, soldier and administrator who in 1371 was summoned to Parliament as a baron. His son died before him without children and any hereditary title lapsed.

== Origins ==
Born about 1299, he was the son and heir of Sir Gilbert Aton, who died after 10 April 1350.

== Career ==
Alleged arms of William Aton, as displayed in the Ashmole Roll

About 1320, when he reached his majority, he was created a knight and it is assumed that he later participated in the wars of King Edward III in France. In 1359, like his father before him, he was summoned to a meeting of the King's Council and in 1370 was summoned to a session of Parliament. By later theory this created a hereditary barony, but there is no record of him attending further sessions and he continued to call himself Sir William Aton, knight. He was chosen as High Sheriff of Yorkshire for 1368–70 and again for 1372–73, but in 1377, aged about 78, he obtained an exemption for the rest of his life from being appointed a sheriff, a justice of the peace, or a mayor. In 1386, recording his age as 87 and saying he had been a knight for 66 years (but not a baron), he was a witness in the celebrated case of Scrope v Grosvenor. He died before March 1389.

== Family ==
Before 1327, he married Isabel Percy (died before 25 May 1368), daughter of Henry Percy, 2nd Baron Percy and his wife Idonea Clifford. Their children were:

- Sir William Aton, who married Margaret but died before 21 June 1384 without children. His widow survived him.
- Anastasia Aton, who married Sir Edward St John (died 7 March 1389), of Londesborough.
- Katherine Aton, who before November 1381 married Sir Ralph Euer (died 10 March 1422), of Witton-le-Wear.
- Elizabeth Aton, married first Sir William Place and secondly Sir John Conyers, of Sockburn (died before 6 March 1396).

Peerage of England
Preceded by New creation	Baron Aton; 1371–1388	Succeeded by In abeyance
