= Adam de Everingham, 2nd Baron Everingham =

14th century English noble

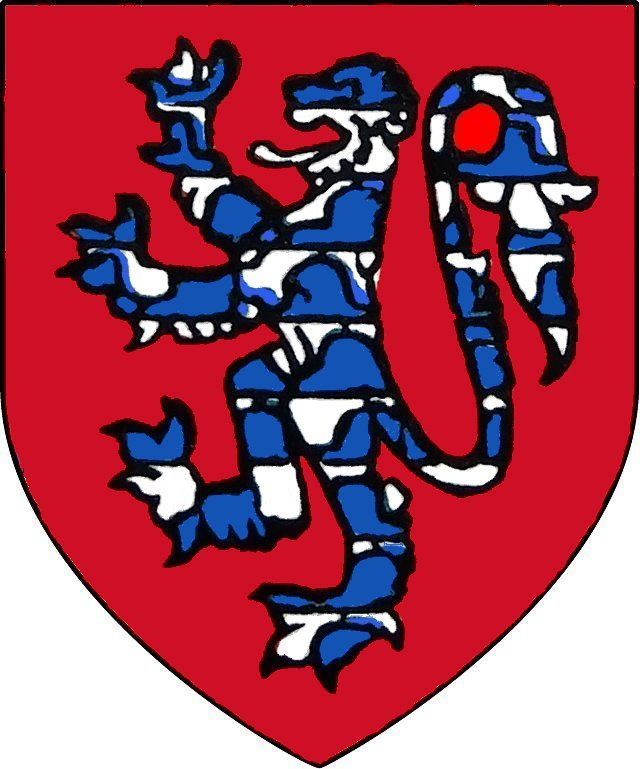
Arms of Baron Everingham:- Gules, a lion rampant vair.

Sir Adam de Everingham, 2nd Baron Everingham (died 1388), Lord of Laxton, was an English noble who fought during the Second War of Scottish Independence and the Hundred Years' War.

Adam was the eldest son of Adam de Everingham and Clarice la Warre. He was summoned to Scotland and participated in the Siege of Berwick and the Battle of Halidon Hill in 1333. Adam was part of the English forces at the Battle of Sluys and Siege of Tournai in 1340, the Battle of Crecy in 1346 and the Siege of Calais from 1346 until 1347. Summoned to Parliament by Writ in January 1371. He died in 1388.

Everingham returned from campaigns in France suffering from an anal fistula. This was operated on successfully by John Aderne who subsequent book about the condition is regarded as a medical milestone.

== Marriage and issue ==
Adam married Joan, daughter of Sir John D'Eyvill of Egmanton and Margaret, they are known to have had the following known issue:

- Margaret de Everingham, married Hugh de Hastings, had issue.
- William de Everingham, married Alice de Grey, had issue.
- Reynold de Everingham, married firstly Agnes Lungvillers, no issue and married secondly Joan Elys, had issue.
- Isabel de Everingham, married William Melton, had issue.
- Joan de Everingham, married Richard Baskerville, had issue.
