= Thomas de Bermingham =

Anglo-Irish peer (died 1375)

Thomas de Bermingham was an Anglo-Irish lord who died in 1375.

De Bermingham was the great-grandson of the founder of Athenry, Meyler de Bermingham, and great-great-grandson of the re-founder of Dunmore.

Little is directly recorded of his term. One of the few mentions occurs in 1373:

Mac-an-Pharson Mac Feorais [Bermingham] was slain by Turlough Roe O'Conor, with one stroke of his sword, in Conmaicne [Dunmore] (after they the Berminghams had acted treacherously towards him, as he was coming from Conmaicne Cuile), and afterwards made his escape, in despite of his enemies, by the strength of arm, but severely wounded. Andreas Mac Kenny was afterwards put to death by them the Berminghams, he having been left with them by Turlough,—when they had acted treacherously towards him,—as a hostage, in whose ransom they might demand what they pleased.

Peerage of Ireland
Preceded by Rickard de Bermingham	Baron Athenry; 1322–1375	Succeeded by Walter de Bermingham
