= Baron Aton =

Alleged arms of Baron Aton; Barry of six or and azure, on a canton gules, a cross flory argent

Baron Aton was a title in the Peerage of England created in 1371 for Sir William Aton, who died in 1389 leaving three daughters: Anastasia, Catherine, and Elizabeth.
