= William Latimer, 4th Baron Latimer =

English noble

Lord Latimer

Personal details
- Born: William Latimer; 24 March 1330 Scampston, East Riding of Yorkshire, England
- Died: 28 May 1381
- Resting place: Guisborough, North Riding of Yorkshire, England

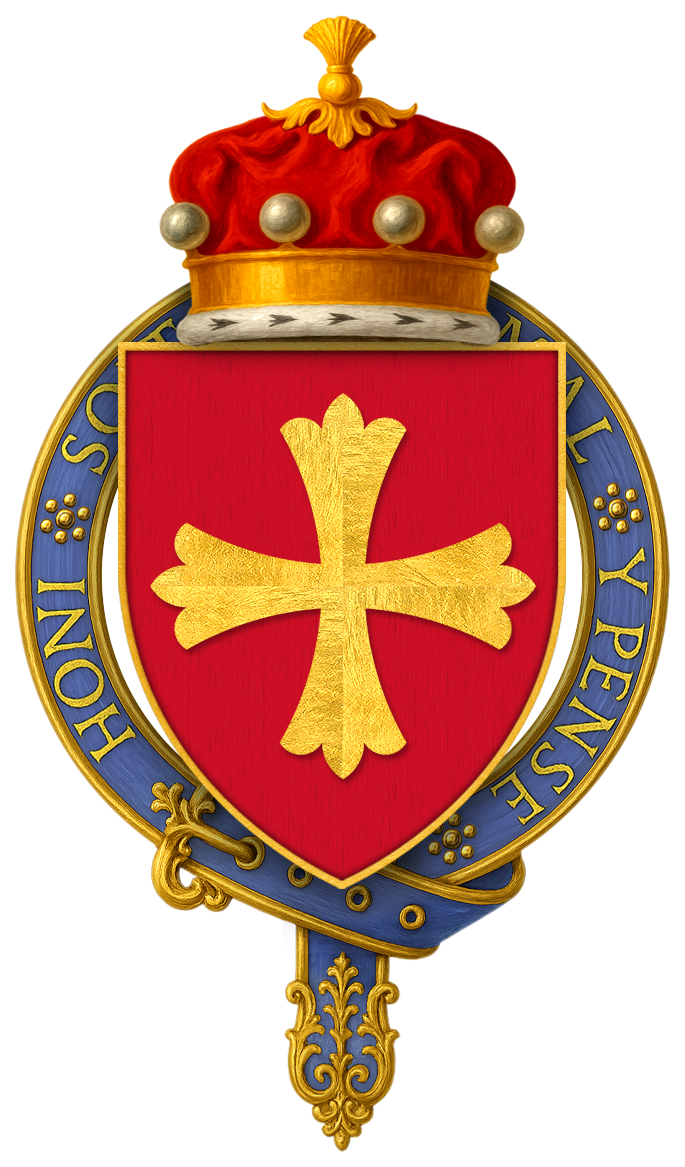
Arms of Sir William Latimer, 4th Baron Latimer, KG

William Latimer, 4th Baron Latimer, KG (24 March 1330 – 28 May 1381) was an English noble, soldier and diplomat. After serving in France and for the household of Edward III, he was impeached during the Good Parliament of 1376, the earliest recorded impeachment in the Parliament of England.

== Early life and service in France ==
Born on 24 March 1330 in Scampston, Buckrose Wapentake, East Riding of Yorkshire (now North Yorkshire), England, Latimer was the son of William Latimer, 3rd Baron Latimer, by Elizabeth, daughter of John de Botetourt, 1st Baron Botetourt. He had married Elizabeth, daughter of Edmund FitzAlan, 9th Earl of Arundel and Alice de Warenne, by 1353 and they had a daughter, Elizabeth (1357–1395). She married firstly John Neville, 3rd Baron Neville de Raby and secondly Robert Willoughby, 4th Baron Willoughby de Eresby.

He was present at the Battle of Crécy in 1346, and by 1351 he had been knighted and was in royal service in Calais. In January 1356 he was present when Edward Balliol surrendered his claim to the Scottish throne and he served in Gascony in 1359. He was created a Knight of the Garter in 1361 in succession to Sir William FitzWarin and fought on the side of John de Montfort, Duke of Brittany at the Battle of Auray in 1364. In 1368, he was appointed Keeper of Bécherel and in 1370 of Saint-Sauveur-le-Vicomte.

== Return to England and impeachment ==
After returning to England, he served as Steward of the Household from 1368 to 1370 and Chamberlain of the Household from 1371. His son-in-law John Neville, Lord Neville de Raby was appointed Steward of the Household in the same year, and until 1376 they were prominent figures in court and Latimer was high in favour with John of Gaunt, Duke of Lancaster, the king's son. He became Constable of Dover Castle in 1373 and Warden of the Cinque Ports in 1374. He was also involved in negotiations with Portugal in 1373 and France in 1375.

When Parliament was called in April 1376, known as the Good Parliament and led by Peter de la Mare, the members wanted to remove corrupt advisers from court. Latimer, Neville, London merchant Richard Lyons and Alice Perrers were accused, and the charges against Latimer were that he had been guilty of oppression in Brittany; had sold the castle of Saint-Sauveur to the enemy, and impeded the relief of Bécherel in 1375; that he had taken bribes for the release of captured ships, and retained fines paid to the king, notably by Sir Robert Knolles, and the city of Bristol; and finally, that in association with Robert Lyons he had obtained money from the crown by the repayment of fictitious loans. Seconded by William of Wykeham, de la Mare sought to have Latimer immediately convicted, with the Commons acting on behalf of the king. They were unsuccessful and a trial took place. The charges were proven and he was removed from his positions in the royal household and on the council, fined and imprisoned. He was pardoned in October 1376 and with Lancaster's recovered influence he returned to favour.

Latimer's impeachment is the earliest recorded in Parliament.

== Later life ==
Latimer was named an executor of the will of Edward III, who died in June 1377. In 1377 he became governor of Calais, and took part against the French at the Battle of Sluys. He also accompanied Thomas of Woodstock, Earl of Buckingham on his expedition through France into Brittany in 1380.

Latimer died on 28 May 1381 and was buried at Gisborough Priory, now in North Yorkshire. He was survived by his wife and their daughter, Elizabeth who married John Neville, 3rd Baron Neville de Raby, and had descendants.

== Footnotes ==
Political offices
Preceded by Sir Richard de Peinbrugge	Lord Warden of the Cinque Ports; 1372–1376	Succeeded by Sir Thomas Reines
Peerage of England
Preceded by William Latimer	Baron Latimer; 1335–1381	Succeeded by Elizabeth Nevill
