= List of peers 1290–1299 =

This page lists all peers who held extant titles between 1290 and 1299.

== Peerage of England ==
| Title | Holder | Date gained | Date lost | Notes |
|---|---|---|---|---|
| Earl of Surrey (1088) | John de Warenne, 6th Earl of Surrey | 1240 | 1304 | 1st Earl of Sussex (1282) |
| Earl of Warwick (1088) | William de Beauchamp, 9th Earl of Warwick | 1267 | 1298 | Died |
| Earl of Warwick (1088) | Guy de Beauchamp, 10th Earl of Warwick | 1298 | 1315 | |
| Earl of Gloucester (1122) | Gilbert de Clare, 7th Earl of Gloucester | 1262 | 1295 | 6th Earl of Hertford; Died |
| Earl of Gloucester (1122) | Gilbert de Clare, 8th Earl of Gloucester | 1295 | 1314 | 7th Earl of Hertford |
| Earl of Arundel (1138) | Richard FitzAlan, 8th Earl of Arundel | 1272 | 1302 | |
| Earl of Norfolk (1140) | Roger Bigod, 5th Earl of Norfolk | 1270 | 1306 | |
| Earl of Devon (1141) | Isabella de Forz, Countess of Devon | 1262 | 1293 | Died, title extinct |
| Earl of Oxford (1142) | Robert de Vere, 5th Earl of Oxford | 1263 | 1297 | Died |
| Earl of Oxford (1142) | Robert de Vere, 6th Earl of Oxford | 1297 | 1331 | |
| Earl of Salisbury (1145) | Margaret Longespée, 4th Countess of Salisbury | 1261 | 1310 | |
| Earl of Hereford (1199) | Humphrey de Bohun, 3rd Earl of Hereford | 1275 | 1298 | 2nd Earl of Essex; Died |
| Earl of Hereford (1199) | Humphrey de Bohun, 4th Earl of Hereford | 1298 | 1322 | 3rd Earl of Essex |
| Earl of Lincoln (1217) | Henry de Lacy, 3rd Earl of Lincoln | 1266 | 1311 | |
| Earl of Cornwall (1225) | Edmund, 2nd Earl of Cornwall | 1272 | 1300 | |
| Earl of Pembroke (1247) | William de Valence, 1st Earl of Pembroke | 1247 | 1296 | Died |
| Earl of Pembroke (1247) | Aymer de Valence, 2nd Earl of Pembroke | 1296 | 1324 | |
| Earl of Leicester (1265) | Edmund Plantagenet, 1st Earl of Leicester | 1267 | 1296 | 1st Earl of Lancaster; Died |
| Earl of Leicester (1265) | Thomas Plantagenet, 2nd Earl of Leicester and Lancaster | 1296 | 1322 | |
| Earl of Richmond (1268) | John II, Duke of Brittany | 1268 | 1305 | |
| Baron de Ros (1264) | William de Ros, 1st Baron de Ros | 1285 | 1316 | |
| Baron le Despencer (1264) | Hugh le Despencer, 2nd Baron le Despencer | 1265 | 1326 | |
| Baron Mowbray (1283) | Roger de Mowbray, 1st Baron Mowbray | 1283 | 1297 | Died |
| Baron Mowbray (1283) | John de Mowbray, 2nd Baron Mowbray | 1297 | 1322 | |
| Baron Braose (1290) | William de Braose, 1st Baron Braose | 1290 | 1291 | Died |
| Baron Braose (1290) | William de Braose, 2nd Baron Braose | 1299 | 1326 | |
| Baron Wake (1295) | John Wake, 1st Baron Wake of Liddell | 1295 | 1300 | New creation |
| Baron Vesci (1295) | William de Vescy, 1st Baron Vescy | 1295 | 1297 | New creation; died, title extinct |
| Baron Gaunt (1295) | Gilbert de Gaunt, 1st Baron Gaunt | 1295 | 1297 | New creation; died, title extinct |
| Baron Clavering (1295) | Robert FitzRoger, 1st Baron Clavering | 1295 | 1310 | New creation |
| Baron Ros de Werke (1295) | Robert Ros, 1st Baron Ros de Werke | 1295 | 1297 | New creation; attainted and his honours were forfeited |
| Baron Neville de Raby (1295) | Ralph Neville, 1st Baron Neville de Raby | 1295 | 1331 | New creation |
| Baron FitzAlan (1295) | Brian FitzAlan, 1st Baron FitzAlan | 1295 | 1305 | New creation |
| Baron Umfraville (1295) | Gilbert de Umfraville, 1st Baron Umfraville | 1295 | 1307 | New creation; Earl of Angus in the Peerage of Scotland |
| Baron Brus (1295) | Robert de Brus, 1st Baron Brus | 1295 | 1304 | New creation |
| Baron Ghisnes (1295) | Ingelram de Ghisnes, 1st Baron Ghisnes | 1295 | 1323 | New creation |
| Baron Mauley (1295) | Peter de Mauley, 1st Baron Mauley | 1295 | 1310 | New creation |
| Baron Furnivall (1295) | Thomas de Furnivall, 1st Baron Furnivall | 1295 | 1332 | New creation |
| Baron FitzWilliam (1295) | Ralph FitzWilliam, 1st Baron FitzWilliam | 1295 | 1315 | New creation |
| Baron Meinill (1295) | Nicholas Meinill, 1st Baron Meinill | 1295 | 1299 | New creation; died |
| Baron Meinill (1295) | Nicholas Meinill, 2nd Baron Meinill | 1299 | 1322 | |
| Baron Fauconberg (1295) | Walter de Fauconberg, 1st Baron Fauconberg | 1295 | 1304 | New creation |
| Baron Greystock (1295) | John de Greystock, 1st Baron Greystock | 1295 | 1306 | New creation |
| Baron Hylton (1295) | Robert Hylton, 1st Baron Hylton | 1295 | 1322 | New creation |
| Baron Huntercombe (1295) | Walter de Huntercombe, 1st Baron Huntercombe | 1295 | 1312 | New creation |
| Baron Lascelles (1295) | Roger de Lascelles | 1295 | 1297 | New creation; died, title fell in abeyance |
| Baron Lutterel (1295) | Robert de Luterel, 1st Baron Luterel | 1295 | 1297 | New creation; died, title extinct |
| Baron Hastings (1295) | John Hastings, 1st Baron Hastings | 1295 | 1313 | |
| Baron FitzWalter (1295) | Robert FitzWalter, 1st Baron FitzWalter | 1295 | 1325 | New creation |
| Baron Giffard (1295) | John Giffard, 1st Baron Giffard | 1295 | 1299 | New creation, died |
| Baron Giffard (1295) | John Giffard, 2nd Baron Giffard | 1299 | 1322 | |
| Baron Verdun (1295) | Theobald de Verdun, 1st Baron Verdun | 1295 | 1309 | New creation |
| Baron Segrave (1295) | Nicholas de Segrave, 1st Baron Segrave | 1295 | 1295 | New creation, died |
| Baron Segrave (1295) | John Segrave, 2nd Baron Segrave | 1295 | 1325 | |
| Baron Segrave of Barton Segrave (1295) | Nicholas de Segrave, 1st Baron Segrave of Barton Segrave | 1295 | 1322 | New creation |
| Baron Tateshall (1295) | Robert de Tateshall, 1st Baron Tateshall | 1295 | 1298 | New creation, died |
| Baron Tateshall (1295) | Robert de Tateshall, 2nd Baron Tateshall | 1298 | 1303 | |
| Baron FitzJohn (1295) | Richard FitzJohn, 1st Baron FitzJohn | 1295 | 1297 | New creation; died, title extinct |
| Baron Basset of Drayton (1295) | Ralph Basset, 1st Baron Basset of Drayton | 1295 | 1299 | |
| Baron Basset of Drayton (1295) | Ralph Basset, 2nd Baron Basset of Drayton | 1299 | 1343 | |
| Baron Berkeley (1295) | Thomas de Berkeley, 1st Baron Berkeley | 1295 | 1321 | New creation |
| Baron Beke (1295) | John Beke, 1st Baron Beke | 1295 | 1304 | New creation |
| Baron Kyme (1295) | Philip de Kyme, 1st Baron Kyme | 1295 | 1323 | New creation |
| Baron FitzWarin (1295) | Fulke FitzWarin, 1st Baron FitzWarin | 1295 | 1315 | New creation |
| Baron Astley (1295) | Andrew of Astley, 1st Baron Astley | 1295 | 1301 | New creation |
| Baron Poyntz (1295) | Hugh Poyntz, 1st Baron Poyntz | 1295 | 1308 | New creation |
| Baron Dynham (1295) | Oliver de Dynham, 1st Baron Dynham | 1295 | 1299 | New creation; died |
| Baron Boteler (1295) | William le Boteler, 1st Baron Boteler | 1295 | 1328 | New creation |
| Baron Grey de Wilton (1295) | Reginald de Grey, 1st Baron Grey de Wilton | 1295 | 1308 | New creation |
| Baron Montalt (1295) | Roger de Montalt, 1st Baron Montalt | 1295 | 1297 | New creation; died |
| Baron Mortimer of Wigmore (1295) | Edmund Mortimer, 1st Baron Mortimer of Wigmore | 1295 | 1304 | New creation |
| Baron Strange (1295) | Roger Le Strange, 1st Baron Strange | 1295 | 1311 | New creation |
| Baron Plugenet (1295) | Alan de Plugenet, 1st Baron Plugenet | 1295 | 1299 | New creation; died |
| Baron Plugenet (1295) | Alan de Plugenet, 2nd Baron Plugenet | 1299 | 1326 | |
| Baron Corbet (1295) | Peter Corbet, 1st Baron Corbet | 1295 | 1300 | New creation |
| Baron Canville (1295) | Geoffrey de Canville, 1st Baron Canville | 1295 | 1308 | New creation |
| Baron Martin (1295) | William Martin, 1st Baron Martin | 1295 | 1325 | New creation |
| Baron Montfort (1295) | John de Montfort, 1st Baron Montfort | 1295 | 1296 | New creation; died |
| Baron Montfort (1295) | John de Montfort, 2nd Baron Montfort | 1296 | 1314 | |
| Baron Knovill (1295) | Bogo de Knovill, 1st Baron Knovill | 1295 | 1306 | New creation |
| Baron Daubeney (1295) | Elias Daubeney, 1st Baron Daubeney | 1295 | 1305 | New creation |
| Baron Foliot (1295) | Jordan Foliot | 1295 | 1299 | New creation; died, none of his heirs were ever summoned to Parliament in respect of this Barony |
| Baron Hussey (1295) | Henry Hussey, 1st Baron Hussey | 1295 | 1332 | New creation |
| Baron Welles (1299) | Adam de Welles, 1st Baron Welles | 1299 | 1311 | New creation |
| Baron Hache (1299) | Eustace de Hache, 1st Baron Hache | 1299 | 1306 | New creation |
| Baron De La Warr (1299) | Roger la Warr, 1st Baron De La Warr | 1299 | 1320 | New creation |
| Baron de la Mare (1299) | John De La Mare, 1st Baron de la Mare | 1299 | 1316 | New creation |
| Baron Zouche of Ashby (1299) | Alan La Zouche, 1st Baron Zouche | 1299 | 1314 | New creation |
| Baron Deincourt (1299) | Edmund Deincourt, 1st Baron Deincourt | 1299 | 1327 | New creation |
| Baron Vere (1299) | Hugh de Vere, 1st Baron Vere | 1299 | 1318 | New creation |
| Baron Montalt (1299) | Robert de Montalt, 1st Baron Montalt | 1299 | 1329 | New creation |
| Baron Havering (1299) | John de Havering, 1st Baron Havering | 1299 | 1329 | New creation |
| Baron Pinkeny (1299) | Henry de Pinkeney, 1st Baron Pinkeney | 1299 | 1301 | New creation |
| Baron Basset of Weldon (1299) | Richard Basset, 1st Baron Basset of Weldon | 1299 | 1314 | New creation |
| Baron Grandison (1299) | William de Grandison, 1st Baron Grandison | 1299 | 1335 | New creation |
| Baron Lancaster (1299) | Henry Plantagenet, 1st Baron Lancaster | 1299 | 1345 | New creation |
| Baron Plessets (1299) | Hugh de Plessets, 1st Baron Plessets | 1295 | 1301 | New creation |
| Baron Toni (1299) | Robert de Toni, 1st Baron Toni | 1299 | 1310 | New creation |
| Baron Peyvre (1299) | John Peyvre, 1st Baron Peyvre | 1299 | 1316 | New creation |
| Baron Teyes (1299) | Henry de Teyes, 1st Baron Teyes | 1299 | 1308 | New creation |
| Baron Mortimer of Chirke (1299) | Roger de Mortimer, 1st Baron Mortimer of Chirke | 1299 | 1336 | New creation |
| Baron Leyburn (1299) | William de Leyburn, 1st Baron Leyburn | 1299 | 1310 | New creation |
| Baron Vavasour (1299) | William le Vavasour, 1st Baron Vavasour | 1299 | 1313 | New creation |
| Baron Ap-Adam (1299) | John Ap-Adam, 1st Baron Ap-Adam | 1299 | 1311 | New creation |
| Baron Muncy (1299) | Walter de Muncy, 1st Baron Muncy | 1299 | 1308 | New creation |
| Baron Scales (1299) | Robert de Scales, 1st Baron Scales | 1299 | 1305 | New creation |
| Baron Lovel (1299) | John Lovel, 1st Baron Lovel | 1299 | 1311 | New creation |
| Baron Engaine (1299) | John Engaine, 1st Baron Engaine | 1299 | 1322 | New creation |
| Baron FitzPayne (1299) | Robert FitzPayne, 1st Baron FitzPayne | 1299 | 1316 | New creation |
| Baron Moels (1299) | John de Moels, 1st Baron Moels | 1299 | 1309 | New creation |
| Baron Mortimer of Richard's Castle (1299) | Hugh de Mortimer, 1st Baron Mortimer of Richard's Castle | 1299 | 1304 | New creation |
| Baron Devereux (1299) | William Devereux, 1st Baron Devereux | 1299 | ? | New creation |
| Baron Courtenay (1299) | Hugh de Courtenay, 1st Baron Courtenay | 1299 | 1340 | New creation |
| Baron Rivers of Ongar (1299) | John Rivers, 1st Baron Rivers | 1299 | 1311 | New creation |
| Baron Mohun (1299) | John de Mohun, 1st Baron Mohun | 1299 | 1330 | New creation |
| Baron Multon of Egremont (1299) | Thomas de Multon, 1st Baron Multon of Egremont | 1299 | 1322 | New creation |
| Baron Chaworth (1299) | Thomas de Chaworth, 1st Baron Chaworth | 1299 | 1315 | New creation |
| Baron Latimer (1299) | William Latimer, 1st Baron Latimer | 1299 | 1305 | New creation |
| Baron Bardolf (1299) | Hugh Bardolf, 1st Baron Bardolf | 1299 | 1304 | New creation |
| Baron Geneville (1299) | Geoffrey de Geneville, 1st Baron Geneville | 1299 | 1314 | New creation |
| Baron Stafford (1299) | Edmund de Stafford, 1st Baron Stafford | 1299 | 1309 | New creation |
| Baron Clinton (1299) | John de Clinton, 1st Baron Clinton | 1299 | 1310 | New creation |
| Baron L'Orti (1299) (or Lord de Urtiaco) | Henry de L'Orti, 1st Baron L'Orti | 1299 | 1321/2 | New creation |
| Baron Beauchamp of Somerset (1299) | John de Beauchamp, 1st Baron Beauchamp | 1299 | 1336 | New creation |
| Baron Ferrers of Chartley (1299) | John de Ferrers, 1st Baron Ferrers of Chartley | 1299 | 1312 | New creation |
| Baron Tregoz (1299) | John de Tregoz, 1st Baron Tregoz | 1299 | 1300 | New creation |
| Baron Percy (1299) | Henry de Percy, 1st Baron Percy | 1299 | 1315 | New creation |
| Baron Valence (1299) | Aymer de Valence, 1st Baron Valence | 1299 | 1323 | New creation |
| Baron de Clifford (1299) | Robert de Clifford, 1st Baron de Clifford | 1299 | 1314 | New creation |
| Baron Saint John of Lageham (1299) | John St John, 1st Baron Saint John of Lageham | 1299 | 1317 | New creation |
| Baron Chavent (1299) | Piers de Chavent, 1st Baron Chavent | 1299 | 1303 | New creation |
| Baron Paynel (1299) | John Paynel, 1st Baron Paynel | 1299 | 1318 | New creation |
| Baron Grandison (1299) | Otho de Grandison, 1st Baron Grandison | 1299 | 1328 | New creation |
| Baron Rithre (1299) | William de Rithre, 1st Baron Rithre | 1299 | 1310 | New creation |
| Baron Saint Amand (1299) | Almaric de St Amand, 1st Baron Saint Amand | 1299 | 1310 | New creation |
| Baron Cauntelo (1299) | William de Cauntelo, 1st Baron Cauntelo | 1299 | 1308 | New creation |
| Baron Pecche (1299) | Gilbert Peccbe, 1st Baron Peeche | 1299 | 1322 | New creation |
| Baron Darcy (1299) | Philip Darcy, Baron Darcy | 1299 | 1332 | New creation |
| Baron Strange of Knockyn (1299) | John le Strange, 1st Baron Strange of Knockyn | 1299 | 1309 | New creation |
| Baron Lisle (1299) | John de Lisle, 1st Baron Lisle | 1299 | 1304 | New creation |
| Baron Sudeley (1299) | John de Sudeley, 1st Baron Sudeley | 1299 | 1336 | New creation |
| Baron Montagu (1299) | Simon de Montagu, 1st Baron Montagu | 1299 | 1316 | New creation |
| Baron Latimer (1299) | Thomas Latimer, 1st Baron Latimer | 1299 | 1334 | New creation |
| Baron Hastings of Inchmahome (1299) | Edmund Hastings, 1st Baron Hastings of Inchmahome | 1299 | 1314 | New creation |
| Baron Lancaster (1299) | John de Lancastre, 1st Baron Lancastre | 1299 | 1334 | New creation |
| Baron St John of Basing (1299) | John St John, 1st Baron Saint John of Basing | 1299 | 1329 | New creation |
| Baron De La Ward (1299) | Robert de La Ward, 1st Baron De La Ward | 1299 | 1307 | New creation |
| Baron FitzReginald (1299) | John FitzReginald, 1st Baron FitzReginald | 1299 | 1310 | New creation |
| Baron Sampson (1299) | William Sampson, 1st Baron Sampson | 1299 | 1306? | New creation |
| Baron Ferrers of Groby (1299) | William Ferrers, 1st Baron Ferrers of Groby | 1299 | 1325 | New creation |
| Baron Grendon (1299) | Ralph Grendon, 1st Baron Grendon | 1299 | 1331 | New creation |
| Baron Morley (1299) | William de Morley, 1st Baron Morley | 1299 | 1310 | New creation |
| Baron Roche (1299) | Thomas de la Roche, 1st Baron Roche | 1299 | 1320 | New creation |
| Baron Tuchet (1299) | William Touchet, 1st Baron Touchet | 1299 | 1306 | New creation |
| Baron Lansladron (1299) | Serlo de Lansladron, 1st Baron Lansladron | 1299 | 1306 | New creation |

== Peerage of Scotland ==
| Title | Holder | Date gained | Date lost | Notes |
|---|---|---|---|---|
| Earl of Mar (1114) | Domhnall I, Earl of Mar | 1281 | 1292 | Died |
| Earl of Mar (1114) | Gartnait, Earl of Mar | 1292 | 1305 | |
| Earl of Dunbar (1115) | Patrick IV, Earl of March | 1289 | 1308 | |
| Earl of Angus (1115) | Gilbert de Umfraville, Earl of Angus | 1246 | 1307 | |
| Earl of Atholl (1115) | John of Strathbogie, Earl of Atholl | 1270 | 1306 | |
| Earl of Buchan (1115) | John Comyn, Earl of Buchan | 1289 | 1308 | |
| Earl of Strathearn (1115) | Maol Íosa III, Earl of Strathearn | 1271 | 1317 | |
| Earl of Fife (1129) | Donnchadh IV, Earl of Fife | 1288 | 1353 | |
| Earl of Menteith (1160) | Mary I, Countess of Menteith | 1258 | 1295 | Died |
| Earl of Menteith (1160) | Alexander, Earl of Menteith | 1295 | 1305 | |
| Earl of Lennox (1184) | Maol Choluim I, Earl of Lennox | 1260 | 1291 | Died |
| Earl of Lennox (1184) | Maol Choluim II, Earl of Lennox | 1291 | 1333 | |
| Earl of Carrick (1184) | Marjorie, Countess of Carrick | 1256 | 1292 | Died |
| Earl of Carrick (1184) | Robert Bruce, Earl of Carrick | 1292 | 1306 | |
| Earl of Ross (1215) | Uilleam II, Earl of Ross | 1274 | 1333 | |
| Earl of Sutherland (1235) | William de Moravia, 2nd Earl of Sutherland | 1248 | 1307 | |

== Peerage of Ireland ==
| Title | Holder | Date gained | Date lost | Notes |
|---|---|---|---|---|
| Earl of Ulster (1264) | Richard Óg de Burgh, 2nd Earl of Ulster | 1271 | 1326 | |
| Baron Athenry (1172) | Peter de Bermingham | 1262 | 1307 | |
| Baron Kingsale (1223) | Nicholas de Courcy, 3rd Baron Kingsale | 1260 | 1290 | Died |
| Baron Kingsale (1223) | Edmund de Courcy, 4th Baron Kingsale | 1290 | 1302 | |
| Baron Kerry (1223) | Maurice Fitzthomas Fitzmaurice, 2nd Baron Kerry | 1260 | 1303 | |
| Baron Barry (1261) | David FitzDavid Barry, 3rd Baron Barry | 1285 | 1290 | Died |
| Baron Barry (1261) | John Barry, 4th Baron Barry | 1290 | 1330 | |

| Preceded by List of peers 1280–1289 | Lists of peers by decade 1290–1299 | Succeeded by List of peers 1300–1309 |
