= Baron Clavering =

Barony in the Peerage of England

Baron Clavering was a title in the Peerage of England. It existed as a feudal barony by tenure, before being created by Writ of summons to Parliament of Robert fitzRoger, as Baron FitzRoger in 1295 until his death in 1310. His son John de Clavering, was created by writ of summons to Parliament as Baron Clavering in 1299 until his death in 1332.

== Feudal barony by tenure ==
- Roger fitz Richard, died 1177.
- Robert fitzRoger, son and heir, died 1214.
- John FitzRobert, son and heir, died 1240.
- Roger FitzJohn, son and heir, died 1249.

== Baron FitzRoger (1295) ==
- Robert fitzRoger, summoned to parliament on 2 November 1295 until 26 January 1297. He was summoned again on 29 December 1299 till 26 August 1307. He died in 1310.

== Baron Clavering (1299) ==
- John de Clavering, son of the above Robert fitzRoger, summoned to parliament on 10 April 1299 till 20 November 1331. He died in 1332. His only child was his daughter Eve, who died about 1369. She was the mother of James Audley, the hero of the Battle of Poitiers, who died in 1369, although she and his father were not married. One source says that the title is probably in abeyance among the descendants of Eve. Another source says that "No right to any Barony of Clavering or FitzRoger appears to have been considered as vesting in this lady."
