= Deborah Hutton =

Deborah Hutton may refer to:

- Deborah Hutton (Australian editor) (born 1961)
- Deborah Hutton (English editor) (1955–2005)
