= John II de Vaux of Beaufront =

Sir John II de Vaux of Beaufront and Corbridge (died 1322) was an English knight and juror of the Liberty of Hexham in Northumberland during the late 13th and early 14th centuries.

== Life ==
John was the son and heir of John I Vaux of Beaufront. He had a daughter Alice who married William Swinburne. On 22 July 1304, he witnessed a charter by Robert fitzRoger which regulated the management, operations, and passage rights of boats crossing the River Tyne at Corbridge,

Vaux was caught up in the border violence of Northumberland of the 13th and 14th centuries. His livestock and personal goods were plundered during a raid on Corbridge by John Quoynt and Richard le Clerk in 1317. Upon Vaux making complaints to the Crown, the Crown on 16 November 1317, issued a commission of oyer and terminer to hear the complaint.

He was appointed by the crown in 1321, together with William de Shafthow as royal commissioners, to settle a land dispute between the Prior of Hexham and Thomas del Syde, over a messuage and 24 acres of land in Aynewyk.

His son John III, died before 1322. Dying in 1322, he was succeeded by his grandson son John IV of Beaufront, who was aged 9.
