= Langley Abbey =

Grade I listed building in South Norfolk, United Kingdom

Coordinates: 52.5721°N 1.4854°E

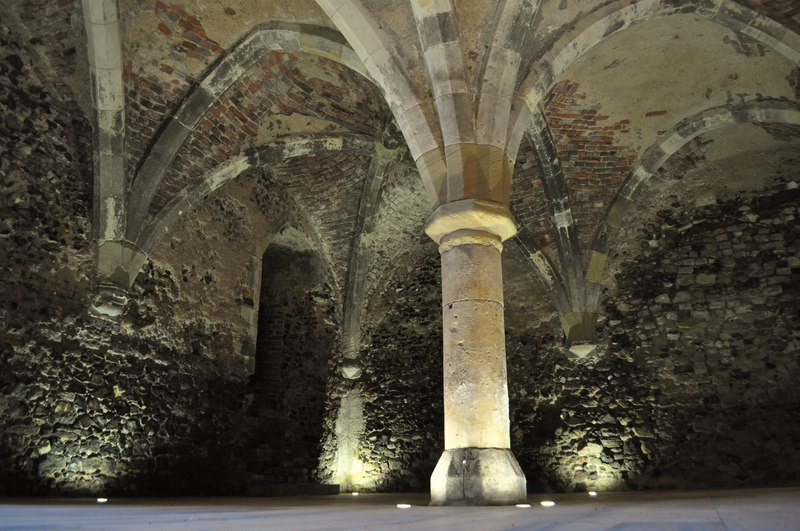
The Abbey is now a museum

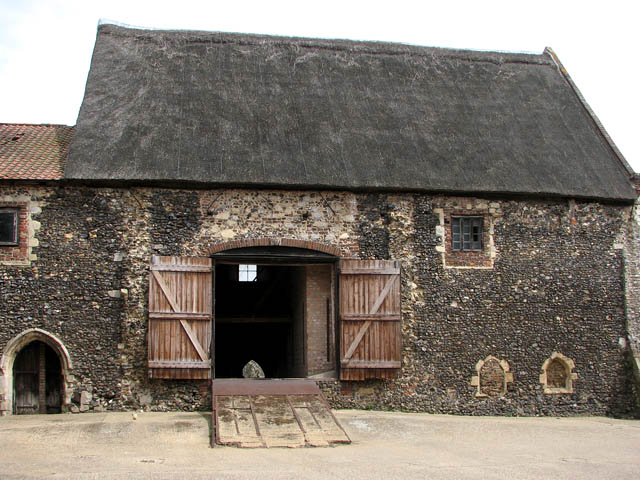
The barn

Langley Abbey was an abbey of Premonstratensian Canons in Langley Green, now in the civil parish of Langley with Hardley, Norfolk, England. The monastery was founded by Robert fitzRoger in 1195.

There are remains of the church and barn as well as earthworks of other buildings and fish ponds. The site was partially restored and opened to the public as a museum in 2010.

It is a Grade I listed building.
