= Deborah Hutton (English editor) =

English writer and magazine editor

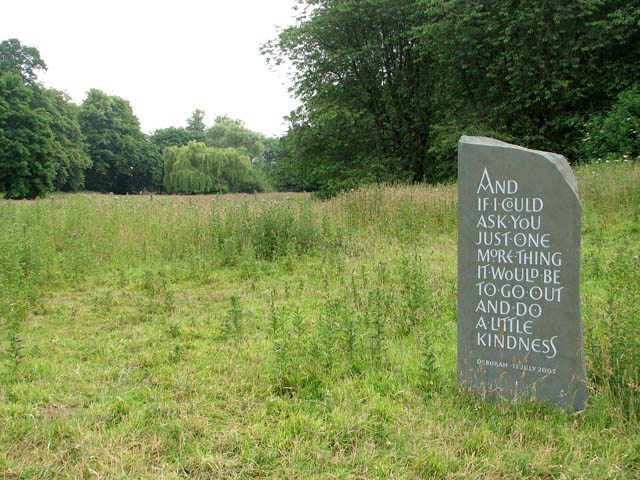
Hutton's memorial stone near Langley, Norfolk. It quotes from the funeral address which she wrote shortly before her death, "And if I could ask you just one more thing it would be to go out and do a little kindness" — Deborah 13 July 2005

Deborah Hutton (7 September 1955 – 15 July 2005) was an English magazine writer who was the Health Editor for Vogue. After being diagnosed with terminal lung cancer in 2004, which she attributed to smoking as a teenager, she became an anti-smoking activist and wrote a book of advice for companions of people who have cancer, What Can I Do To Help?.

== Early life ==
Hutton had a twin sister and grew up on a farm near Langley, Norfolk. She attended Benenden School and graduated from the University of York with a First in English. In 1984, she married Charlie Stebbings, whom she had met at university. They had four children, Archie, Romilly, Eleanor, and Frederick, who suffered from cerebral palsy.

== Writing career ==
While working for the British Council in 1979, Hutton won a job with Vogue through a talent contest, and became its first Health Editor as the subject piqued her interest. She was credited with pioneering health journalism. She wrote several Vogue books on the subject. After nearly 20 years at the magazine, she left to spend more time with her children and did freelance work. She contributed to The Sunday Times, The Guardian and the Evening Standard.

== Cancer diagnosis ==
Hutton first smoked at age 12 and smoked habitually from her mid-teens to her early 20s, before quitting and becoming what she described as a "fanatically intolerant antismoking ex-smoker". On 26 November 2004, at the age of 49, she was diagnosed with stage 4 Adenocarcinoma, a lung cancer which had metastasised to her bones and lymph nodes; she later wrote "there is no stage five". Several of her family members had previously died of lung cancer.

Hutton said that there was evidence that low tar cigarettes like the Silk Cut she had smoked were more dangerous as they are inhaled deeper, in contrast to the safe and feminine image with which they are regarded. She pointed out that more teenage girls than boys smoke, although their lungs are less resistant to carcinogens, and that lung cancer had overtaken breast cancer as the biggest killer of women. She urged the British government to take note of smoking among teenage girls.

Hutton wrote a book titled What Can I Do To Help? with advice for companions of people with cancer, including contributions from public figures such as Tony Benn and Cherie Blair. It was published the day before her death, with all proceeds going to Macmillan Cancer Support. Macmillan offered a volunteering award in Hutton's memory. Her widower Charlie Stebbings set up Cut Films, which makes films encouraging teenagers not to smoke.
