= List of peers 1280–1289 =

This page lists all peers who held extant titles between 1280 and 1289.

== Peerage of England ==
Title	Holder	Date gained	Date lost	Notes
Earl of Surrey (1088)	John de Warenne, 6th Earl of Surrey	1240	1304	1st Earl of Sussex (1282)
Earl of Warwick (1088)	William de Beauchamp, 9th Earl of Warwick	1267	1298	
Earl of Gloucester (1122)	Gilbert de Clare, 7th Earl of Gloucester	1262	1295	6th Earl of Hertford
Earl of Arundel (1138)	Richard FitzAlan, 8th Earl of Arundel	1272	1302	
Earl of Norfolk (1140)	Roger Bigod, 5th Earl of Norfolk	1270	1306	
Earl of Devon (1141)	Isabella de Fortibus, Countess of Devon	1262	1293	
Earl of Oxford (1142)	Robert de Vere, 5th Earl of Oxford	1263	1297	
Earl of Salisbury (1145)	Margaret Longespée, 4th Countess of Salisbury	1261	1310	
Earl of Hereford (1199)	Humphrey de Bohun, 3rd Earl of Hereford	1275	1298	2nd Earl of Essex
Earl of Lincoln (1217)	Henry de Lacy, 3rd Earl of Lincoln	1266	1311	
Earl of Cornwall (1225)	Edmund, 2nd Earl of Cornwall	1272	1300	
Earl of Pembroke (1247)	William de Valence, 1st Earl of Pembroke	1247	1296	
Earl of Leicester (1265)	Edmund Plantagenet, 1st Earl of Leicester	1267	1296	1st Earl of Lancaster
Earl of Richmond (1268)	John II, Duke of Brittany	1268	1305	
Baron de Ros (1264)	(Robert de Ros)	1264	1285	Died
Baron de Ros (1264)	William de Ros, 1st Baron de Ros	1285	1316	
Baron le Despencer (1264)	Hugh le Despencer, 2nd Baron le Despencer	1265	1326	
Baron Basset of Drayton (1264)	Ralph Basset, 2nd Baron Basset of Drayton	1265	1299	
Baron Basset of Sapcote (1264)	Ralph Basset, 1st Baron Basset of Sapcote	1264	1282	Died
Baron Basset of Sapcote (1264)	Simon Basset, 2nd Basset of Sapcote	1282	1300	
Baron Mowbray (1283)	Roger de Mowbray, 1st Baron Mowbray	1283	1297	

== Peerage of Scotland ==
Title	Holder	Date gained	Date lost	Notes
Earl of Mar (1114)	Uilleam, Earl of Mar	Abt. 1240	1281	Died
Earl of Mar (1114)	Domhnall I, Earl of Mar	1281	1292	
Earl of Dunbar (1115)	Patrick III, Earl of Dunbar	1248	1289	Died
Earl of Dunbar (1115)	Patrick IV, Earl of March	1289	1308	
Earl of Angus (1115)	Gilbert de Umfraville, Earl of Angus	1246	1307	
Earl of Atholl (1115)	John of Strathbogie, Earl of Atholl	1270	1306	
Earl of Buchan (1115)	Alexander Comyn, Earl of Buchan	Abt. 1243	1289	Died
Earl of Buchan (1115)	John Comyn, Earl of Buchan	1289	1308	
Earl of Strathearn (1115)	Maol Íosa III, Earl of Strathearn	1271	1317	
Earl of Fife (1129)	Donnchadh III, Earl of Fife	1270	1288	Died
Earl of Fife (1129)	Donnchadh IV, Earl of Fife	1288	1353	
Earl of Menteith (1160)	Mary I, Countess of Menteith	1258	1295	
Earl of Lennox (1184)	Maol Choluim I, Earl of Lennox	1260	1291	
Earl of Carrick (1184)	Marjorie, Countess of Carrick	1256	1292	
Earl of Ross (1215)	Uilleam II, Earl of Ross	1274	1333	
Earl of Sutherland (1235)	William de Moravia, 2nd Earl of Sutherland	1248	1307	

== Peerage of Ireland ==
Title	Holder	Date gained	Date lost	Notes
Earl of Ulster (1264)	Richard Óg de Burgh, 2nd Earl of Ulster	1271	1326	
Baron Athenry (1172)	Peter de Bermingham	1262	1307	
Baron Kingsale (1223)	Nicholas de Courcy, 3rd Baron Kingsale	1260	1290	
Baron Kerry (1223)	Maurice Fitzthomas Fitzmaurice, 2nd Baron Kerry	1260	1303	
Baron Barry (1261)	John Barry, 2nd Baron Barry	1278	1285	Died
Baron Barry (1261)	David FitzDavid Barry, 3rd Baron Barry	1285	1290	

Preceded by List of peers 1270–1279	Lists of peers by decade 1280–1289	Succeeded by List of peers 1290–1299
