= Langley with Hardley =

Coordinates: 52.561952°N 1.484871°E

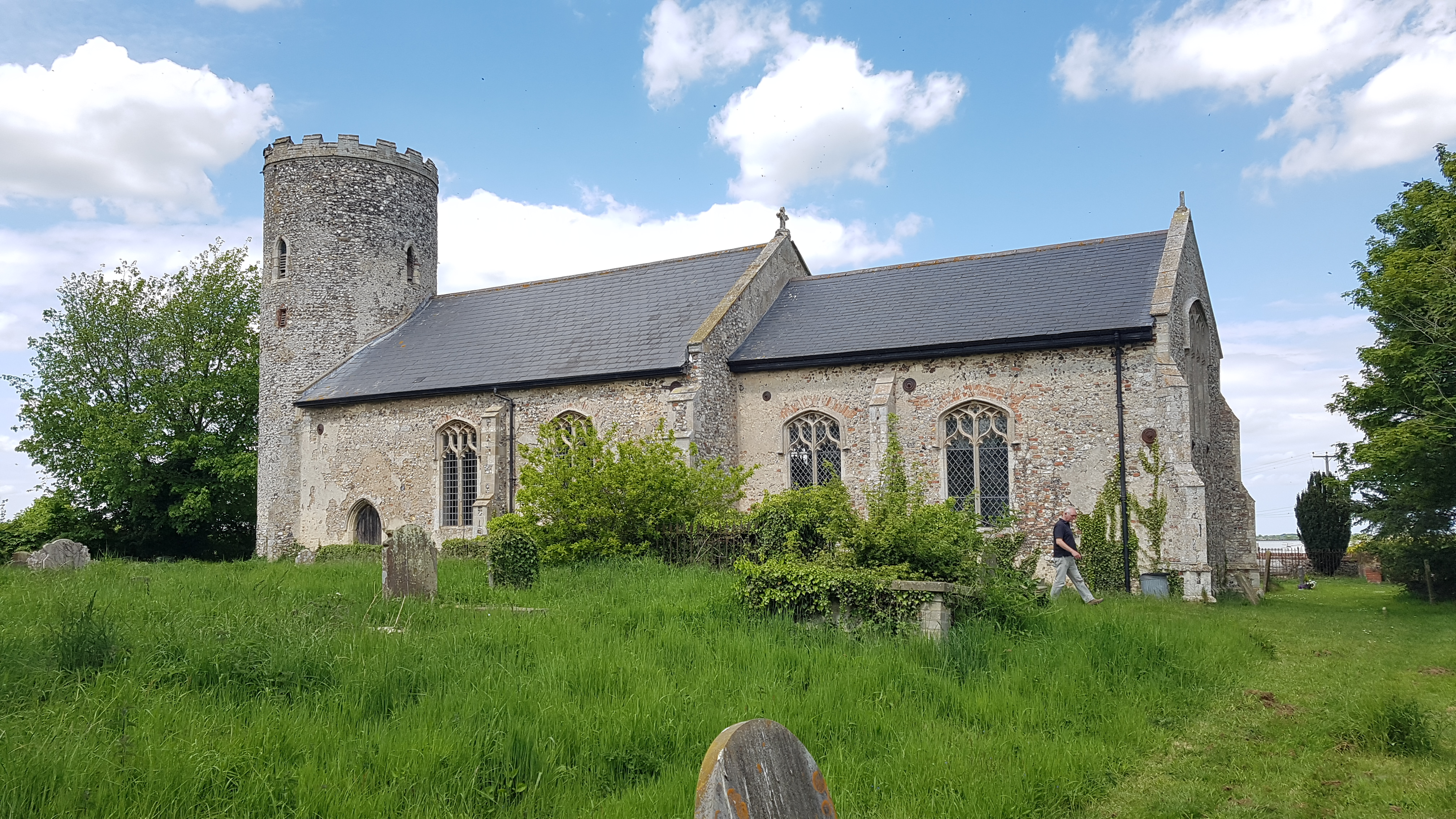
- St. Margaret's Church

- Location within Norfolk
- Area: 5.81 sq mi (15.0 km^{2})
- Population: 490
  - Density: 84/sq mi (32/km^{2})
- OS grid reference: TG373010
- Civil parish: Langley with Hardley
- District: South Norfolk
- Shire county: Norfolk
- Region: East
- Country: England
- Sovereign state: United Kingdom
- Post town: NORWICH
- Postcode district: NR14
- Dialling code: 01508
- UK Parliament: South Norfolk

Langley with Hardley is a civil parish in the English county of Norfolk, consisting of the separate villages of Langley and Hardley.

Langley with Hardley is located 1.9 miles (3.1 km) north of Loddon and 9.3 miles (15.0 km) south-west of Norwich, along the River Yare and within the Norfolk Broads.

== History ==
Langley's name is of Anglo-Saxon origin and derives from the Old English for long-wood clearing. Whereas, Hardley's name derives from the Old English for hard-wood clearing.

In the Domesday Book, Langley is listed as a settlement of 39 households in the hundred of Lodding. In 1086, the village was part of the East Anglian estates of William de Beaufeu. Whereas, Hardley is listed as a settlement of 9 households in the hundred of Lodding. In 1086, the village was part of the East Anglian estates of St Benet's Abbey.

Langley Abbey was a Premonstratensians monastery which was built in 1195, founded by Robert fitzRoger. At the time of the dissolution of the monasteries, the monastic property was sold to the Berney family who held it until the Eighteenth Century. In 2010, the abbey opened as a museum.

Langley Hall was built in 1740 in the Palladian style by Matthew Brettingham and later expanded by Anthony Salvin. In 1910, the hall became Langley School: a private, fee-paying school open to boarding male and female students. The current headmaster is Mr. S. Cooke and notable alumni include Sir John Mills.

On 25 August 1959, a Hawker Hunter of No. 74 Squadron RAF crashed in Langley after carrying out unauthorised acrobatics. The pilot (Flight-Lieutenant P. P. Rayner) ejected safely with the aircraft crashing in Langley, it is reported that the engine landed on the doorstep of Hazelmere Cottage.

== Geography ==
According to the 2021 census, Langley with Hardley has a total population of 490 people which demonstrates an increase from the 488 people listed in the 2011 census.

== St. Margaret's Church ==
Hardley's church is dedicated to Saint Margaret and dates from the Fourteenth Century, being one of Norfolk's 124 remaining round-tower churches. St. Margaret's is located on Lower Hardley Road and has been Grade I listed since 1960. The church still holds Sunday service once a month and is part of the Chet Valley Benefice.

St. Margaret's was sympathetically restored in the Victorian era and still retains many of its medieval features.

== St. Michael's Church ==
Langley's church is dedicated to Saint Michael and dates from the Fourteenth Century. St. Michael's is located on Stone Lane and has been Grade I listed since 1960. The church is no longer open for Sunday service.

St. Michael's holds many stained-glass windows which were imported from the Continent and was heavily restored in the Victorian era.

== Governance ==
Langley with Hardley is part of the electoral ward of Loddon & Chedgrave for local elections and is part of the district of South Norfolk.

The village's national constituency is South Norfolk which has been represented by the Labour's Ben Goldsborough MP since 2024.
