= John Lewyn =

14th-century English master mason

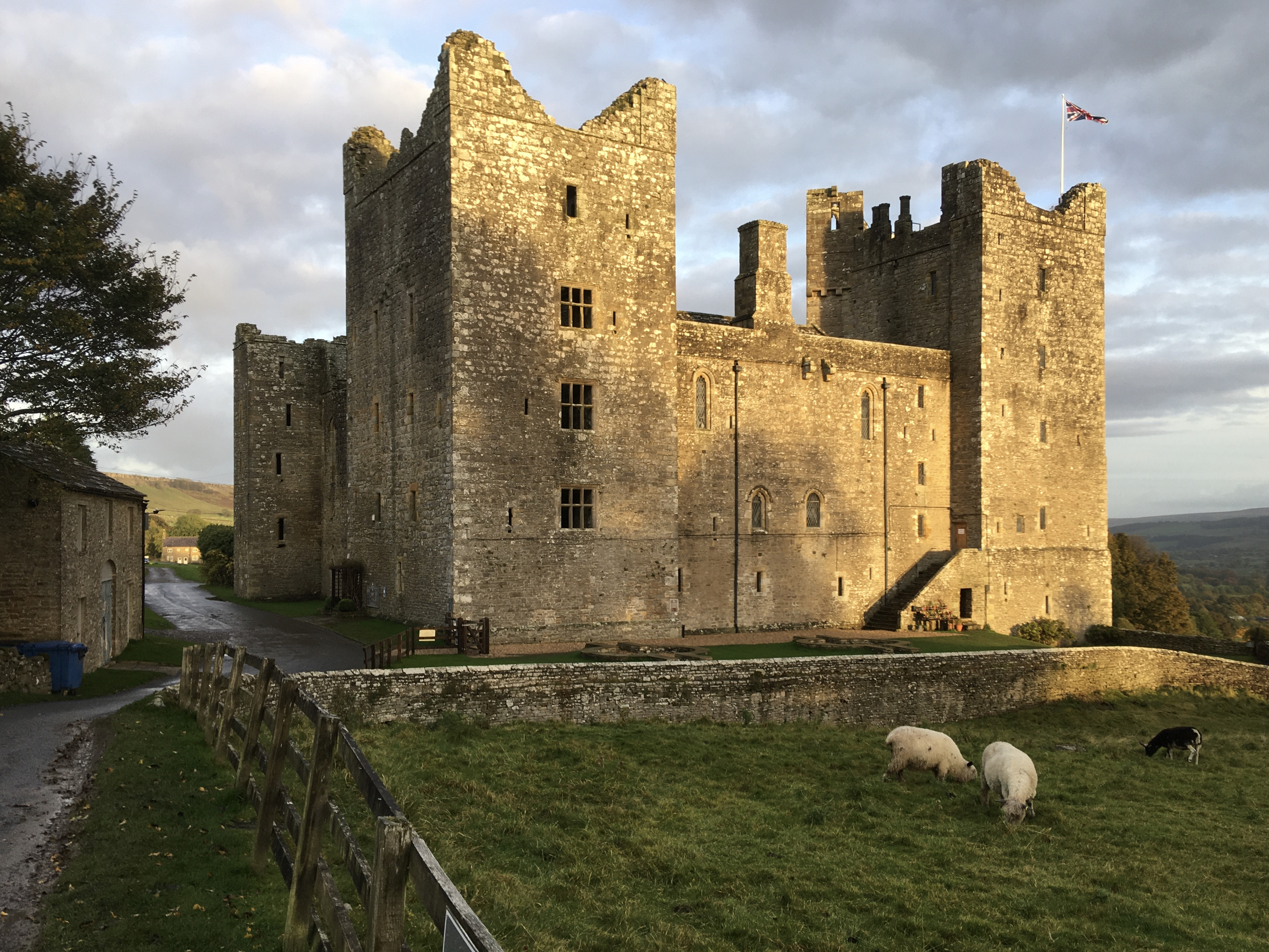
Bolton Castle

John Lewyn (fl. early 1360s-c.1400) was an English master mason of the late 14th century. He was considered the pre-eminent master mason of that time in the north of England. He is regarded as one of the three leading masons of the Perpendicular style in the later 14th century, along with Henry Yevele in the south-east and William Wynford in the south-west. Notable works by Lewyn include Bolton Castle, the gatehouse at Carlisle Castle, the kitchen at Durham Cathedral and probably the keep at Warkworth Castle.

== Life and career ==
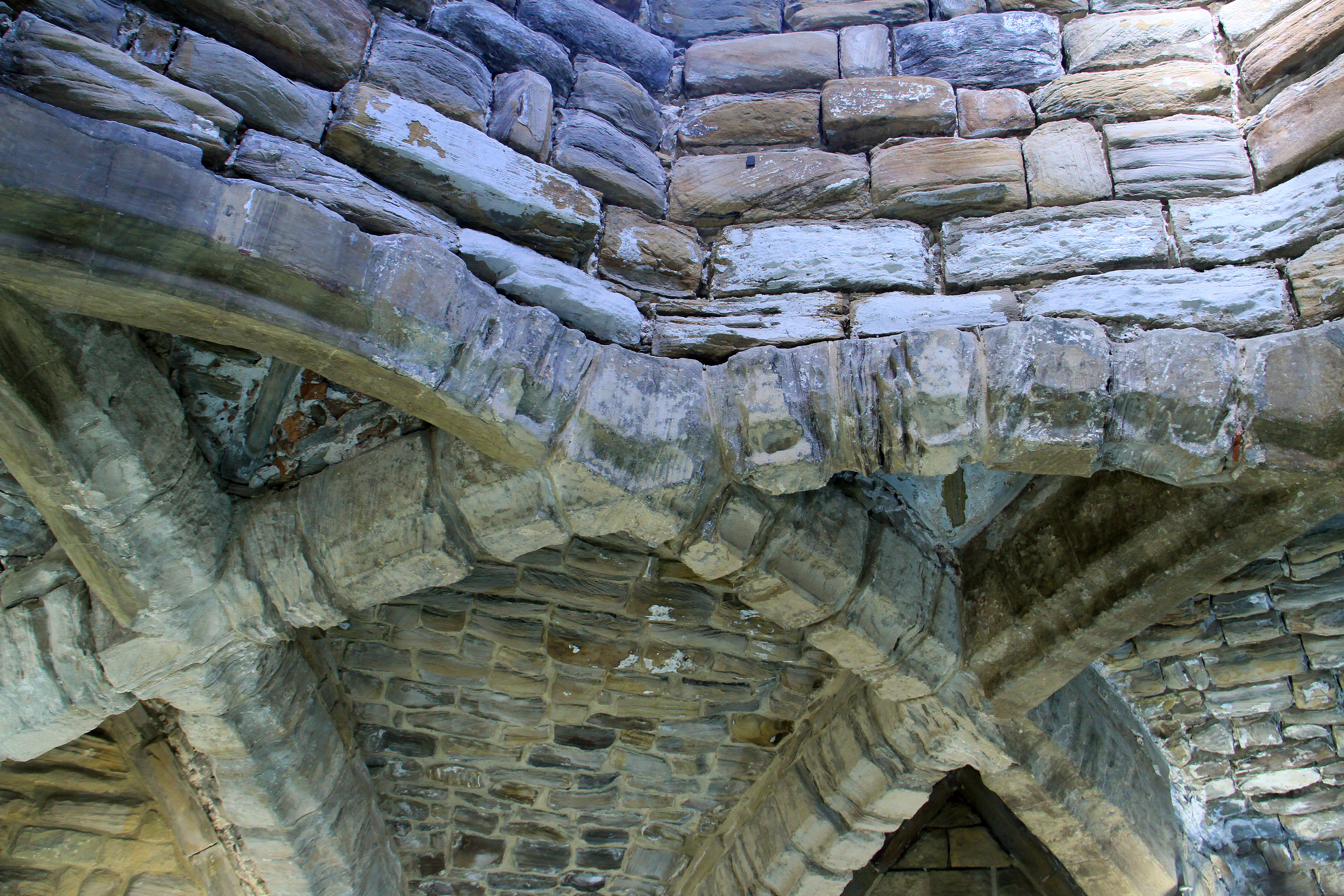
Detail of the kitchen vault at Durham Cathedral

Lewyn's early life is unknown, though as he first appears in records in 1353 as a mason of Durham Priory, he was likely born some time before the mid-14th century. However, a 'John Lewy' who may be the same person is documented at Westminster in 1351 and Windsor in the 1360s. The first building project firmly linked to Lewyn is work at Coldingham Priory, a cell of Durham, in 1364, though whatever he built has since been lost. His earliest surviving building is the kitchen at Durham Priory (1367-74). Its unusual, possibly Spanish-influenced vault suggests that Lewyn may have spent time abroad in his early career, though this cannot be proven. By 1368 he was recorded as "the bishop [of Durham]'s mason," and received grants of land from Bishop Hatfield.

From 1368 and throughout the 1370s and 1380s, Lewyn worked extensively for the Crown to improve the royal castles at Bamburgh, Roxburgh and Carlisle, though his work only survives at Carlisle. In 1378, Lewyn entered into a contract with Sir Richard Scrope to build part of Bolton Castle, though its stylistic unity makes it almost certain that he was responsible for its entire design, making this his largest and arguably most important surviving work. Other projects linked to Lewyn are works at Dunstanburgh Castle (largely executed by Henry Holme, though possibly to Lewyn's design), Finchale Priory and Brancepeth (though this contract refers to roads, not the slightly earlier castle). In addition to his architectural business, Lewyn traded (unsuccessfully) in wool at Newcastle. He disappears from the written record after 1398, when his quarry at Durham is referred to, and presumably died around 1400.

Lewyn is known to have had at least one son, Walter Lewyn, with whom he worked at Brancepeth.

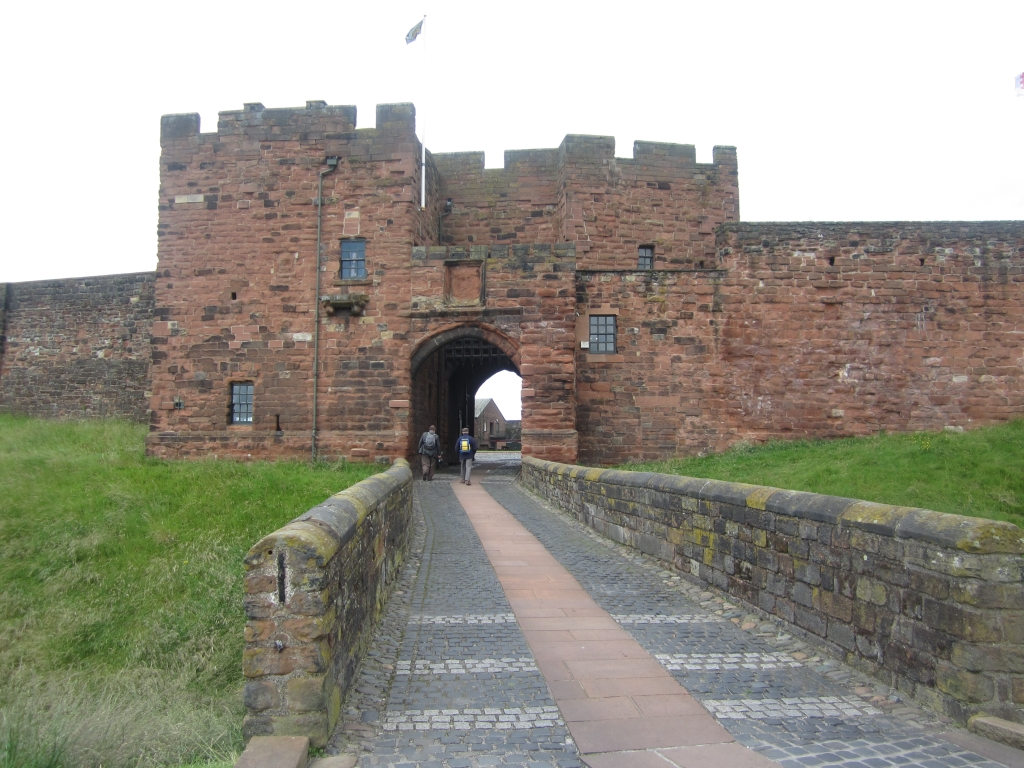
The gatehouse of Carlisle Castle

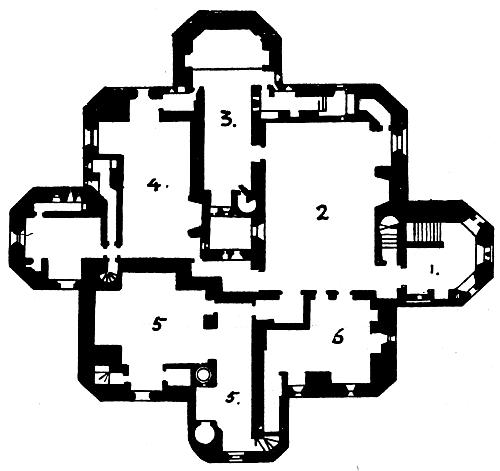
First-floor plan of the keep at Warkworth. 1: entrance lobby. 2: hall. 3: chapel. 4: great chamber. 5: kitchens. 6: buttery and pantry.

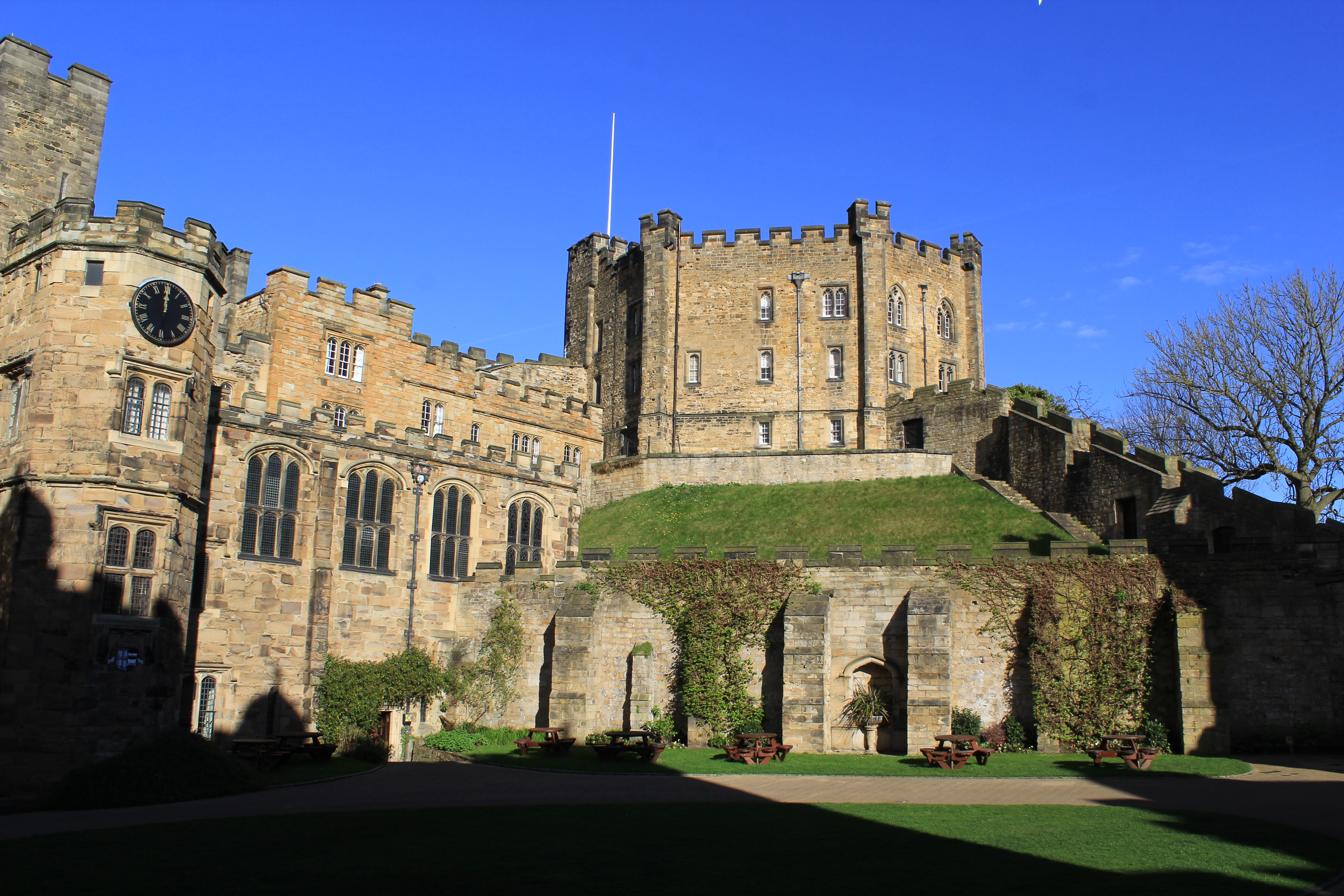
Durham Castle - the rebuilt keep is on the mound

== Style ==
Unlike many of his contemporaries, Lewyn is primarily recorded as working on castles, a reflection of the disturbed state of northern England after the Wars of Independence and of the increasing power of the Percy and Neville families, entrusted with defending the border. The emergence of these powerful families led to the construction of what Anthony Emery termed 'palace fortresses', luxurious houses that, in contrast to southern buildings like Dartington Hall, had the appearance of castles, though they were not primarily intended for military use. The Perpendicular style of the Court appeared in the far north with the erection of the Neville Screen, designed by Henry Yevele and shipped from London, in the 1370s. An assessment of Lewyn's style is challenging, as the only surviving buildings firmly linked to him are Durham's kitchen, Bolton Castle and the gatehouse at Carlisle Castle, though the attribution of Warkworth Castle to him is firm enough for it to inform analysis. One reason to ascribe Warkworth to Lewyn is the use of flues in the hall window-heads to draw away smoke, a feature exactly paralleled at Bolton.

His buildings are characterised by the complex planning, with suites of 'private' rooms, mural chambers and winding staircases, in vogue in the 14th century, especially Bolton and Warkworth. At Bolton, this allowed for the castle to be occupied by no fewer than eight households at once, in Patrick Faulkner's interpretation. At Warkworth, meanwhile, complex planning allowed all the elements of a normal manor house to be compressed into a cruciform tower, with a clear separation between the service and domestic sides. In general form as well as detail, Warkworth is something of an outlier, featuring polygonal turrets and nearly-triangular arches. It is possible that these were derived from John of Gaunt's new buildings at Kenilworth Castle, which used similar forms. Notably, Gaunt was Lewyn's client at Dunstanburgh, which may explain a connection. Today, many of Lewyn's buildings appear austere, but this is a false impression, for they were originally decorated with an elaborate paraphernalia of turrets, battlements, pinnacles and sculpture, fragments of which survive at Bolton and Warkworth. The scale and regularity of Bolton, in contrast to the disorder of earlier 14th century castles at Alnwick, Raby and Brancepeth, was much admired, and was copied, either by Lewyn or others, in the quadrangular castles of Lumley, Sheriff Hutton and Wressle.

Another feature distinctive to Lewyn's work is the star vault. This has parallels in Islamic architecture, such as the Mosque at Cordoba, though it is occasionally seen elsewhere in Europe. Lewyn used the form over the kitchen at Durham, and its occurrence over the kitchens at Raby and Cockermouth castles forms the basis of their attributions to him.

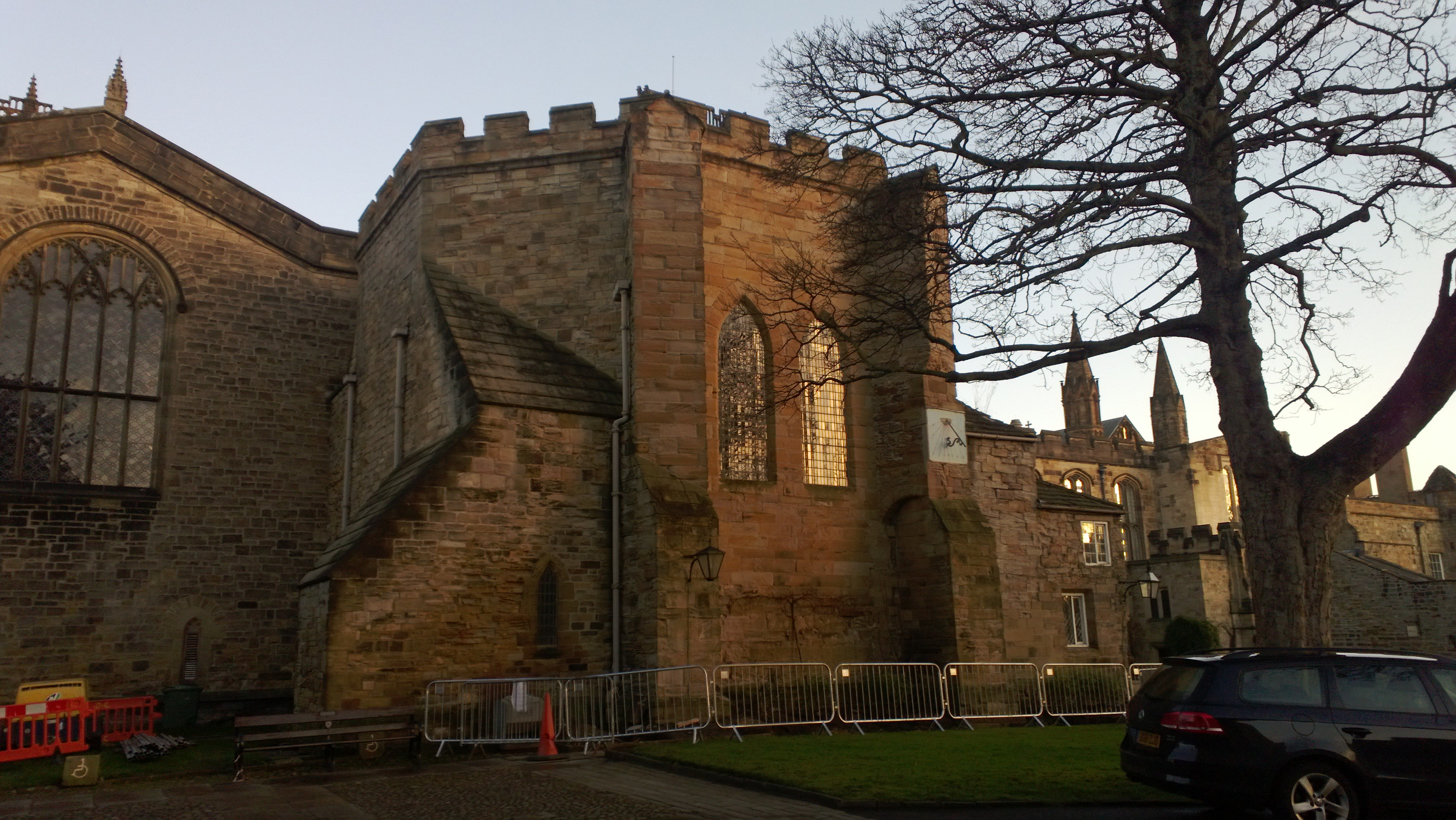
The kitchen at Durham Cathedral-Priory

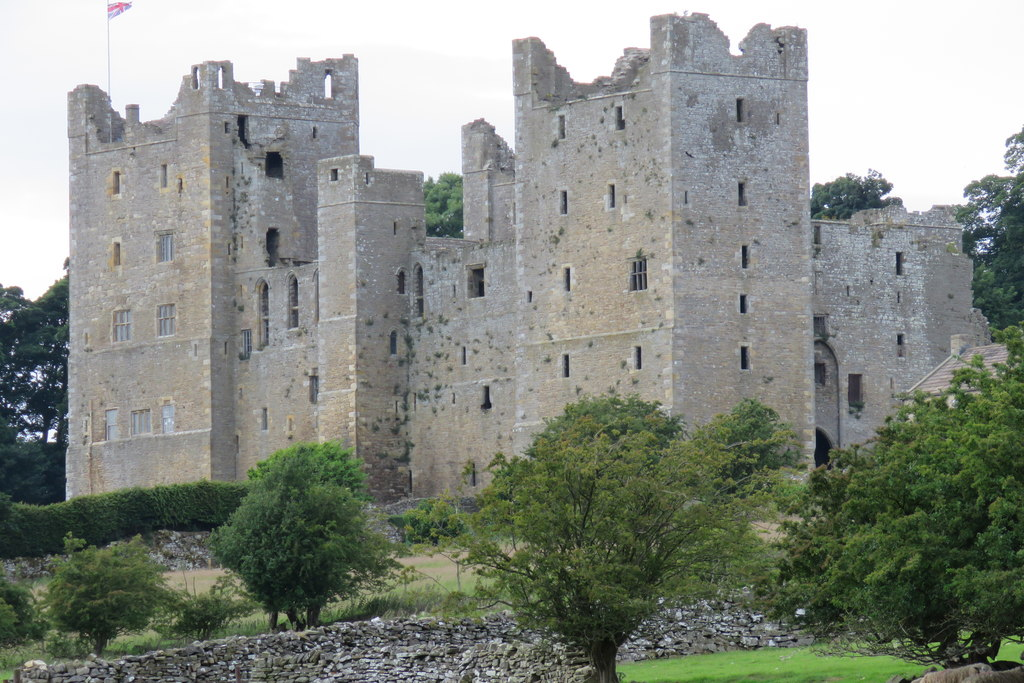
Bolton Castle

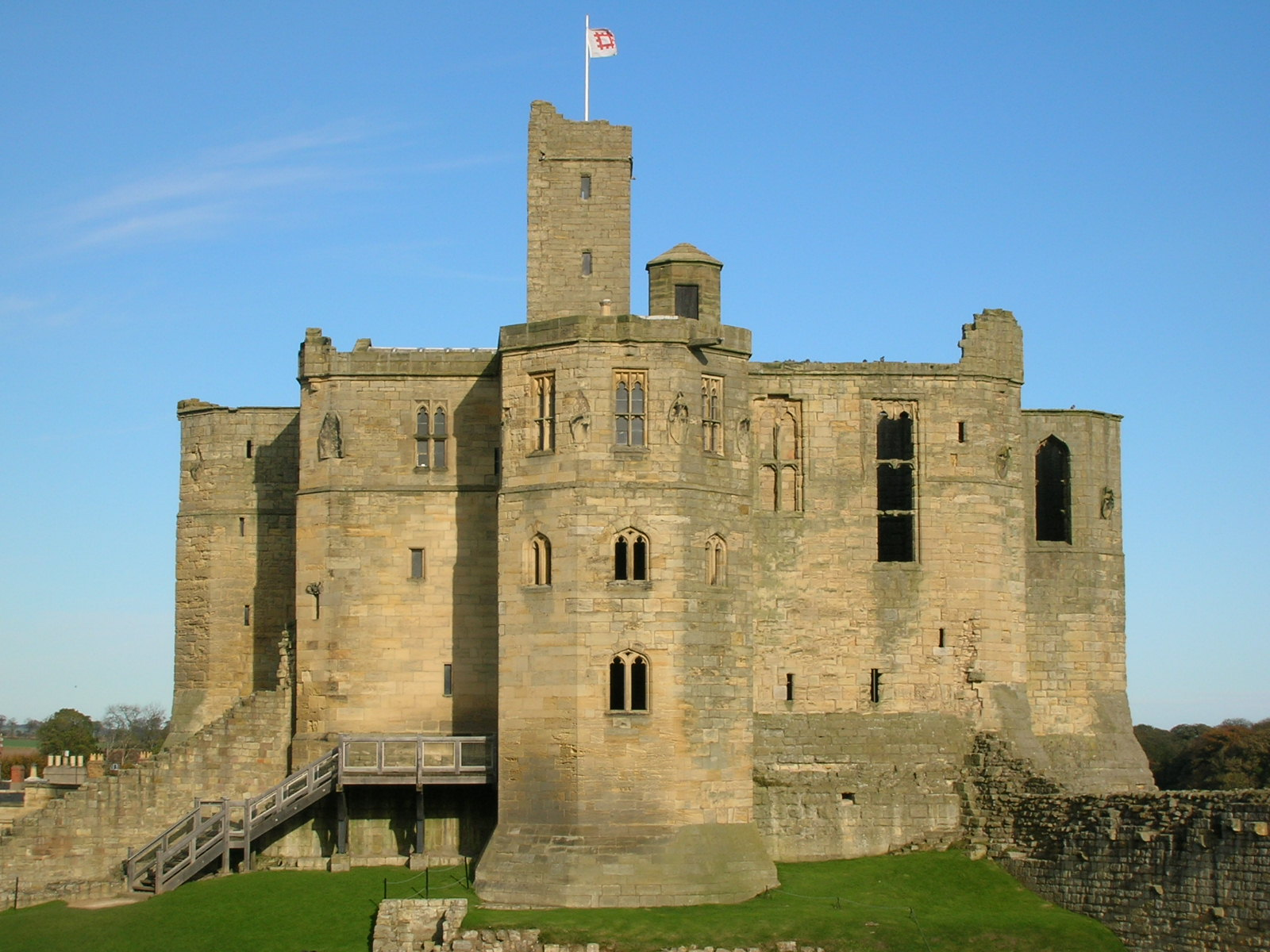
The keep at Warkworth Castle

== Works ==
=== Works linked to Lewyn by documentary evidence: ===
- Durham Castle (possibly 1360s) - works unclear but potentially the keep, rebuilt in the 19th century
- Coldingham Priory (1364) - works unclear and since destroyed
- Durham Cathedral-Priory (1367-74) - kitchen and cloisters (the latter rebuilt in the 18th century)
- Bamburgh Castle (1368-72) - domestic ranges, since destroyed
- Carlisle Castle (1378-83) - outer gatehouse, alias De Ireby's Tower
- Roxburgh Castle (1378-87 and 1392) - curtain wall and three towers, since destroyed
- Bolton Castle (1378-c.1396)
- Finchale Priory (1398-98) - works unclear

=== Works ascribed to Lewyn on stylistic grounds: ===
While these works have been linked to Lewyn by modern authors, in the absence of documentary evidence they must be regarded as merely possibly by him or his office, or potentially inspired by his work.

- Cockermouth Castle - gatehouses, domestic range and kitchen
- Durham Cathedral-Priory - Bishop Hatfield's tomb and throne
- Howden Minster (1380) - chapter house, tentatively suggested by John Harvey
- Hylton Castle - John Goodall believes this to have the same designer as Lumley
- Lumley Castle (1389)
- Melrose Abbey (after 1389) - east end, tentatively suggested by Harvey
- Raby Castle - especially the kitchen, with a vault like that of Durham
- Sheriff Hutton Castle - now reduced to shattered fragments
- Warkworth Castle (possibly 1390s, though historians' suggested dates have varied wildly) - keep. This is now generally accepted as Lewyn's work.
- Wressle Castle (1390s) - only one range and two towers survive of the quadrangular building
