= John Ap-Adam, 1st Baron Ap-Adam =

Arms of John Ap Adam: Argent, on a cross gules, five mullets or.

John Ap Adam III, 1st Baron Ap-Adam son of Reginald Ap Adam (1242-1268 and Joan De Knoxville (1246–1311) (died May 1311) was created baron by writ in 1299.

The first baron served in the Scottish wars. On 22 July 1298, he served in the battle of Falkirk and was knighted and borne his coat of arms afterwards.

John Ap Adam married Elizabeth de Gurnay, the daughter of John de Gurnay Baron of Beverstone, and Olivia Lovel. They had at least one son, Sir Thomas Ap-Adam, who left children.

This Thomas was never summoned to parliament; thus the barony became dormant.

Peerage of England
New creation	Baron Ap-Adam; 1299–1310	Abeyant
