= Baron Ap-Adam =

Baron Ap-Adam was a title in the Peerage of England. It was created by Writ of summons to Parliament of John Ap-Adam in 1297 until his death in 1311, when the title became in abeyance.

== Baron Ap-Adam (1297) ==
- John Ap-Adam: He summoned to parliament on 26 January 1297. He was again summoned from 6 February 1299 until 12 December 1309. He died in 1311 and the title became in abeyance amongst his descendants.
