= Roger FitzJohn =

- Died: 1248-1249
- Spouse: Isabel de Dunbar
- Issue: Robert fitzRoger; Euphemia
- Parents: John FitzRobert; Ada de Baillol

Roger FitzJohn (died 1248/1249) was an English feudal baron, Lord of Clavering, Warkworth and Horsford. He was the son of John FitzRobert and Ada de Baillol.

== Marriage and issue ==
He married Isabel de Dunbar, daughter of Patrick Dunbar, 6th Earl of Dunbar and Euphemia, and is known to have had the following issue:

- Robert fitzRoger, married Margery la Zouche, had issue.
- Euphemia, firstly married William Comyn of Kilbride, and secondly Andrew de Moray of Petty, had issue.
