= Nicholas Meinill, 1st Baron Meinill =

English noble

Coat of arms of Nicholas Meinill, Lord of Whorlton, Azure, three bars gemelles, and a chief or.

Nicholas Meinill, 1st Baron Meinill (Note: Surname also spelt as Meynill) (died 1322), Lord of Whorlton was an English noble. He fought in the wars in Wales and Scotland.

== Biography ==
Nicholas was the son of Stephen Meinill. He served in the Welsh and Scotch wars and received the manor of Castle Leavington for services in 1285. Summoned to parliament by writ from 23 June 1295 until 6 February 1299. He married Christian, who in 1290 he accused of attempting to poison him. He died in early 1322. His wife survived him. He was succeeded by his brother John. An illegitimate son Nicholas, by Lucy de Thweng was later summoned to parliament.
