= Henry de L'Orti, 1st Baron L'Orti =

English noble

Coat of arms of Henry de L'Orti, Lord of Curry Revel, Vert, a pale or.

Henry de L'Orti (Note: Surname also spelt as Urtiaco) (died 1321), Lord of Curry Revell and Esseleigh was an English noble. He served in English campaigns in Wales and Scotland.

== Biography ==
Hugh was the son of Hugh de L'Orti and Sabina de Revell. He served in the wars in Wales and Scotland and was summoned to parliament by writ of summons on 6 February 1299. He was succeeded by his son Hugh, who was summoned to parliament in 1325.
