= Hugh de Plessets, 1st Baron Plessets =

English noble

Coat of arms of Hugh de Plessets, Lord of Hooknorton, Argent, six annulets gules (3, 2, 1).

Hugh de Plessets (Note: Also known as Hugh du Plessis or Hugh de Plecy) (died 1301), Lord of Hooknorton was an English noble. He served in English campaign in Scotland.

== Biography ==
Hugh was the son of Hugh de Plessets and Isabel Bisset. He served in the wars in Scotland, and was summoned to parliament by writ of summons on 6 February 1299. He was succeeded by his son Hugh.
