= Serlo de Lansladron, 1st Baron Lansladron =

English noble

Coat of arms of Serlo de Lansladron, Lord of Lansladron, Sable, three chevronels argent.

Serlo de Lansladron, 1st Baron Lansladron (Note: Also known as Serlo de Nansladron) (died 1306), Lord of Lansladron was an English noble. He fought in the wars in Scotland.

== Biography ==
Serlo was summoned to parliament on five occasions by writs between 24 December 1299 and 3 November 1306. He took part in expeditions in Scotland during the First War of Scottish Independence.

== Marriage and issue ==
Serlo had the following issue:

- Henry de Lansladron, had issue.
- Miranda (Merauld) de Lansladron, married John de Govely, had issue.

He married Amicia, widow of Odo le Arcedekne.
