= John FitzRobert =

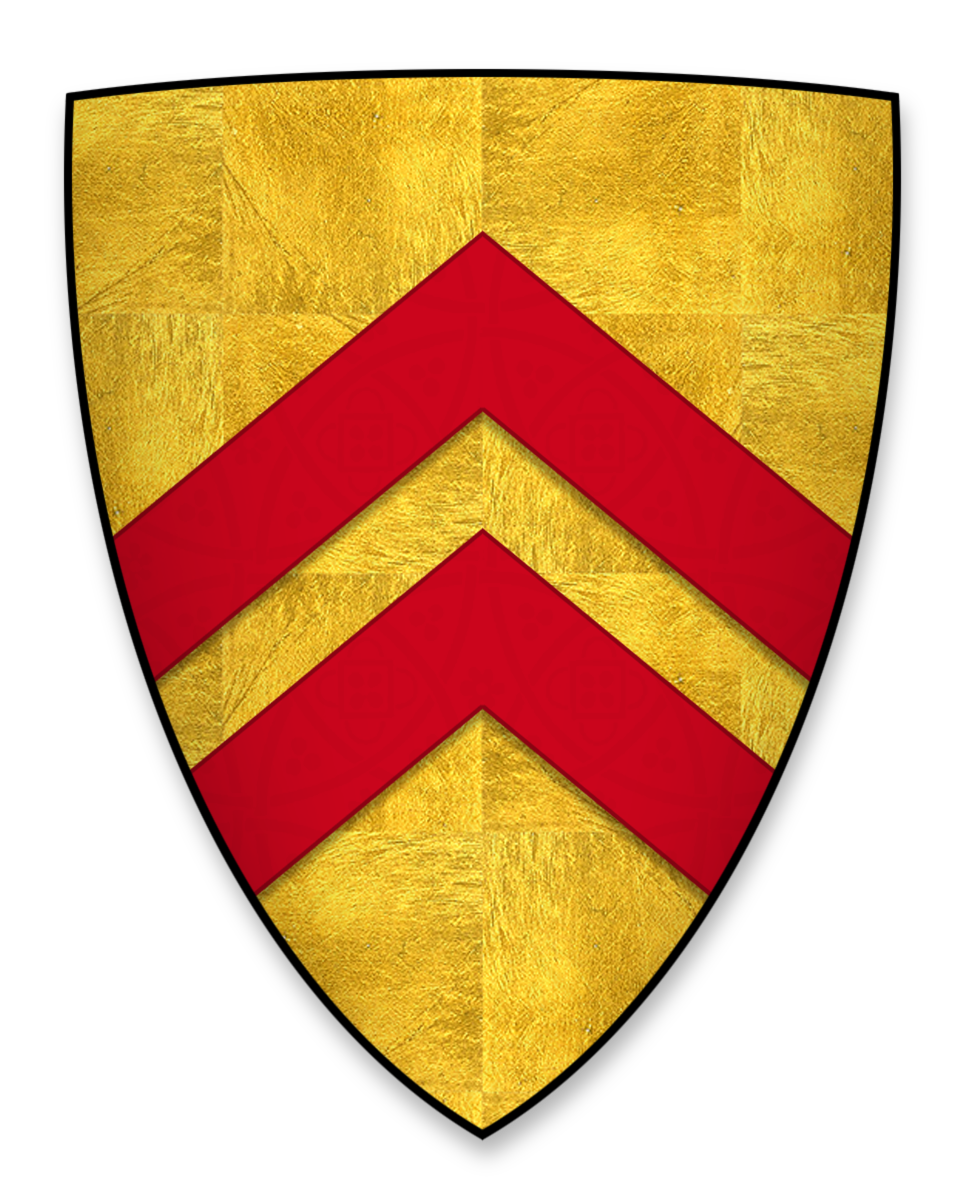
- Arms of John FitzRobert, lord of Warkworth Castle
- Died: 1249
- Spouse: Ada de Balliol
- Issue: Roger FitzJohn; Cecily FitzJohn; Hugh de Eure
- Parents: Robert fitzRoger; Margaret de Chesney

John FitzRobert (ca. 1190–1240) (de Clavering) is listed as one of the Surety Barons for Magna Carta (1215), although it seems not previously noted as a rebel. He was the son of Robert fitzRoger and Margaret Chesney.

== Life ==
History relates that with the renewal of hostilities in the autumn of 1215, he joined the barons in waging war against King John of England. Notwithstanding that, he is listed as sheriff of Norfolk and Suffolk for the year 1215–16. After the baronial defeat at Lincoln in May, he submitted to King Henry III of England's minority government. He served as sheriff of Northumberland from 1224 to 1227.

== Marriage and issue ==
He married Ada, ca. 1218, a daughter of Hugh de Balliol and Cecily de Fontaines. His son Roger FitzJohn, married Isabel de Dunbar daughter of Patrick II, Earl of Dunbar. His daughter Cecily married Patrick III, Earl of Dunbar. He was also the father of a son Hugh de Eure from whom the Lords Eure descend; as well as the father of a son Robert FitzJohn de Stokkes, who may have been Sheriff of London.
