= Roger de Lascelles =

13th century English nobleman

Arms of Roger de Lascelles: Argent, three chaplets gules.

Roger de Lascelles (died 1297), Lord of Kirby Knowle, was an English noble.

Roger was a son of Thomas de Maunby and Avice de Lascelles. He adopted the name and arms of Lascelles. He was summoned to Parliament between 1295 and his death in 1297.

== Marriage and issue ==
He married Isabel and had the following known issue:

- Maud de Lascelles, married firstly William Hilton and secondly Robert Tilliol.
- Theophania de Lascelles, married Ralph FitzRandolph.
- Johanna de Lascelles, married Thomas de Culwen.
- Avicia de Lascelles, married Robert Constable of Halsham.
