= John Peyvre, 1st Baron Peyvre =

English noble

Coat of arms of John Peyvre, Lord of Toddington, Argent, on a chevron gules, three fleurs-de-lis or

John Peyvre (died 1316), Lord of Toddington was an English noble. He served in English campaigns in Flanders and Scotland.

== Biography ==
John was the son of Paulin Peyvre and Annora Belet. He served in the wars in Flanders and Scotland and was summoned to parliament by writ of summons on 6 February 1299. John attended the coronation of Edward II of England in 1307.

== Marriages and issue ==
John married firstly Beatrice, whose parentage is currently unknown, they had the following issue:

- Paulin Peyvre (died 1324)
- John Peyvre

He married secondly Marie de Picquigny, without issue.
