= Roger fitz Richard =

English noble (died 1177)

- Arms of Roger fitz Richard: Quarterly, or and gules, a bend sable
- Died: 1177
- Spouse: Alice de Vere
- Issue: Robert fitz Roger of Warkworth and Clavering
- Parents: Unknown, either Richard fitz Eustace; Albreda de Lisours or a daughter of Roger Bigod

Roger fitz Richard, Lord of Warkworth and Clavering (died 1177), was a prominent 12th-century English noble. He was a son of either Richard fitz Eustace and Albreda de Lisours or the daughter of Roger Bigod of Norfolk.

== Life ==
Roger was a son of Richard fitz Eustace and Albreda de Lisours. Roger was the constable of Newcastle Castle, Newcastle upon Tyne and received by gift of King Henry II of England, the manor of Warkworth, Northumberland in 1157. John fitz Richard his brother was the Constable of Chester and another brother, Robert fitz Richard, was the prior of the Knights Hospitaller in England. During 1163, he was given the manor of Clavering, Essex and the hand of Alice de Vere, after the forfeiture and taking of the habit of Henry of Essex. In 1174, during King William I of Scotland's raid into Northumberland, Roger's castle of Warkworth was destroyed and Newcastle Castle was reinforced with troops, so that the King of Scotland did not attempt to besiege the castle.

== Family ==
Roger married Adelisa (Alice), former wife of Henry de Essex, a daughter of Aubrey de Vere and Alice de Clare, they had the following known issue:

- Robert fitz Roger of Warkworth and Clavering – married Margery de Chesney; had issue.

== Unknown Parentage ==
According to Keats-Rohan in Domesday People, "In the mid-twelfth century Roger fitz Richard of Warkworth was described by his brother-in-law William de Vere as nepos (meaning nephew in Latin) of Roger Bigod's son Hugh and as having had an uncle Thomas de Candelent" (With Hugh Bigod being Hugh Bigod, 1st Earl of Norfolk, the son of Roger Bigod of Norfolk). This stament led to the belief that Roger fitz Richard is actually the son of a Bigod, often called Jane or Joan. However, this can be explained by his wife, Alice de Vere's first marriage to Henry of Essex, whose mother was Gunnora Bigod (a sister to the aforementioned Hugh Bigod).
