= Robert fitzRoger =

12th and 13th-century Anglo-Norman sheriff

Sheriff of Norfolk and Suffolk
- In office Michaelmas 1190 – Easter 1194

Sheriff of Norfolk and Suffolk
- In office Michaelmas 1197 – Easter 1200

Personal details
- Died: 1214
- Spouse: Margaret de Chesney
- Children: John FitzRobert; Alice
- Parent(s): Roger fitz Richard; Alice de Vere

Robert fitzRoger (died 1214) was an Anglo-Norman nobleman and Sheriff of Norfolk and Suffolk and Northumberland. He was a son of Roger fitzRichard and Adelisa de Vere. FitzRoger owed some of his early offices to William Longchamp, but continued in royal service even after the fall of Longchamp. His marriage to an heiress brought him more lands, which were extensive enough for him to be ranked as a baron. FitzRoger founded Langley Abbey in Norfolk in 1195.

== Life ==
FitzRoger was the son of the Anglo-Norman nobleman Roger fitzRichard, who held Warkworth Castle in Northumberland. FitzRoger was sheriff of Norfolk from Michaelmas (Note: Michaelmas was the feast day of the Archangel Michael on 29 September. In England, it was one of the four days of the year when accounts were settled.) in 1190 to Easter 1194 and then again from Michaelmas 1197 to Easter 1200. FitzRoger's first appointment as sheriff was due to the influence of William de Longchamp, who was Lord Chancellor. Longchamp's influence also secured custody of Orford Castle in Suffolk for fitzRoger. Longchamp also arranged for fitzRoger to have custody of Eye Castle in Suffolk. When Longchamp fell from royal favour and was replaced by Walter of Coutances, fitzRoger was one of the few of Longchamp's appointments to retain his office of sheriff.

FitzRoger founded the monastery of Langley Abbey in Norfolk in 1195 for Premonstratensian canons. He purchased royal confirmation of his ownership of Warkworth in 1199 and in 1205 was granted Newburn and the barony of Whalton in Northumberland. Warkworth and Newburn were occasionally considered baronies, but not consistently. FitzRoger also held Clavering from Henry of Essex for one knight's fee. (Note: Robert fitzRoger who held Clavering should not be confused with a separate Robert fitzRoger who held lands around Calthorpe in Norfolk.) FitzRoger's holdings were extensive enough that he was considered a baron during the reigns of King Richard I and King John of England. He was one of John's favourites and hosted the king at Warkworth in 1213.

FitzRoger married Margaret, one of the daughters and heiresses of William de Chesney, the founder of Sibton Abbey. Margaret was one of three daughters, but she inherited the bulk of her father's estates. Margaret was the widow of Hugh de Cressy. (Note: Although Margaret was the eldest daughter, she received the bulk of her father's estates as a reward for de Cressy from King Henry II of England. The King arranged Margaret's first marriage as well as ensuring that most of her father's lands went to her.) Through Margaret, Roger gained the barony of Blythburgh in Suffolk. He also acquired lands at Rottingdean in Sussex from Margaret.

FitzRoger died in 1214, and his heir was his son by his wife Margaret, John fitzRobert. Margaret survived fitzRoger and paid a fine of a thousand pounds to the king for the right to administer her lands and dower properties herself. His daughter Alice married Peter FitzHerbert of Blewleveny.
