= Robert fitzRoger (died 1310) =

13th and 14th-century English nobleman

- Arms of Robert FitzRoger (de Clavering): Quarterly or and gules, a bend sable

Personal details
- Born: 1247
- Died: between 25 March and 29 April 1310
- Spouse: Margaret de la Zouche
- Children: est. 10, including John de Clavering
- Parent(s): Roger FitzJohn; Isabel de Dunbar

Robert fitzRoger (1247–1310), Lord of Warkworth, Clavering and Eure, was an English baron. He was a son of Roger FitzJohn and Isabel de Dunbar. FitzRoger fought in the wars in Wales, Gascony and Scotland.

== Life ==
FitzRoger was the son of Roger fitzJohn, who held Warkworth Castle and was lord of Warkworth, Clavering and Eure. Roger died in 1249, leaving his son in infancy. FitzRoger was placed into the guardianship of William de Valence, although FitzRoger's grandmother Ada de Baillol, offered to buy the wardship of her grandson. In the right of his mother, FitzRoger obtained the barony of Blythburgh, Suffolk.

A distinguished soldier, FitzRoger fought in wars in Wales in 1277, 1282 and 1283, the wars against Scotland in 1291 until 1309 and in Gascony in 1294. He was summoned to the English Parliament of 1295 as Lord FitzRoger. During the battle of Stirling Bridge in 1297, fitzRoger was captured. He was a joint Captain of the Scotch Marches from November 1297. FitzRoger fought with his son John at the battle of Falkirk in 1298 and the siege of Caerlaverock in 1300. FitzRoger signed the Barons' Letter of 1301. He conducted a foray with John de Segrave from Berwick in 1302, and fought at the battle of Methven in 1306. He died in 1310.

== Marriage and issue ==
FitzRoger married Margaret de la Zouche, the daughter of Alan de la Zouche and Ellen de Quincy and had the following known issue:

- John de Clavering (died 1332), married Hawise de Tybetot, had issue.
- Euphemia de Clavering (died 1329), married Ranulph Neville, 1st Baron Neville.
- Elizabeth de Clavering, married John De Mauteby, had issue.
- Robert de Clavering
- Alexander de Clavering, married Joan de Burgh, with no legitimate issue.
- Henry de Clavering
- Roger de Clavering, married Beatrice of unknown parentage, had issue.
- Allan de Callaly, married Isabella Riddell, had issue.
- Edmund de Clavering
- Ellen de Clavering, married John Engaine, with no legitimate issue.
