= Giles d'Argentan =

Norman knight

Sir Giles d'Argentan
- Arms of Giles d'Argentan: Gules, crusily and three covered cups argent.
- Died: 24 June 1314 Bannockburn, Kingdom of Scotland
- Allegiance: Henry VII, Holy Roman Emperor; Edward II of England
- Rank: Knight

Giles d'Argentan (c. 1280 – 24 June 1314) was a Norman knight who was slain at the Battle of Bannockburn. At the time he was serving under King Edward II of England. According to the Liber Pluscardensis, d'Argentan was ranked in his prime as one of the three most accomplished knights in Christendom, along with the Holy Roman Emperor Henry and King Robert I of Scotland.

Born in about 1280, at or near Argentan, d'Argentan had participated in a Crusade to the Middle East via the Knights of Rhodes, during which he had been captured by the Emperor of Byzantium, Andronikos II Palaiologos. Edward had ransomed d'Argentan from that Emperor, so as to place a well-respected warrior at his side. He had also served in the wars of Henry of Luxembourg, Holy Roman Emperor.

On 24 June 1314, the second day of the Battle of Bannockburn, d'Argentan was riding with the Earl of Pembroke on either side of King Edward. When it became clear that the battle was lost, the knight and the Earl drew the King to safety, in spite of his protests and the worsening confusion among the English ranks. After coming clear of the melée, d'Argentan told the King that he had never fled from a battle, "nor will I now." He turned back to face the Scots, and was killed by a party of 800 spearmen led by Alexander Gillespie. His death is described in the Vita Edwardi Secundi, Thomas Grey's Scalacronica, and John Barbour's poem Brus.
