= Action at Lanark =

13th-century battle in Scotland

Coordinates: 55.6749°N 3.7770°W

- Part of the First War of Scottish Independence
Date	May 1297
Location	Lanark
Result	Scottish victory

Belligerents
Kingdom of Scotland	Kingdom of England

Commanders and leaders
William Wallace	William Heselrig †

Strength
Unknown	Unknown

Casualties and losses
Unknown	240

The action at Lanark was an attack at Lanark, Scotland during the First War of Scottish Independence in May 1297. The Scotsman William Wallace led an uprising against the English and killed the Sheriff of Lanark, William Heselrig. The attack was not an isolated incident, but rather saw Wallace joining in with uprisings taking place across Scotland.

Not much is definitely known about this incident. The best account comes from the Scalacronica by Thomas Grey, whose father, also called Thomas Grey, was present. A fracas broke out at a court being held by Heselrig, but Wallace was able to escape with help from an individual named Innes who may have been his wife. He then came back with some supporters and attacked Heselrig and his men, killed Heselrig, nearly killed Thomas Grey, Sr. and set fire to some houses. Wallace then continued with his rebellion, which culminated in his victory at the Battle of Stirling Bridge four months later.

It is unclear what Wallace was doing at Heselrig's court, and whether this was a spontaneous incident or if it was co-ordinated with other uprisings in Scotland.

According to the 15th-century poem The Wallace, written by Blind Harry, Wallace carried out the attack in revenge for the killing of his wife by Heselrig. Her name is traditionally claimed to be Marion Braidfute of Lamington. Harry also claims that Wallace dismembered Heselrig's body. In 2005 Wallace biographer Ed Archer disputed the existence of Marion Braidfute, as there had been no mention of her prior to a revised rendition of Blind Harry's poem in 1570, believed by Archer to have been commissioned by the Baillies of Lamington, to gain favor with Mary, Queen of Scots by claiming relation to Wallace through their Braidfute lineage.

Fictionalised versions of this incident have appeared in various accounts of Wallace's life, notably in the 1995 film Braveheart, in which his wife was called Murron MacClannough, and her execution preceded the battle.
