= Norham Castle =

Ruined castle in Northumberland, England

- Northumberland, England, UK
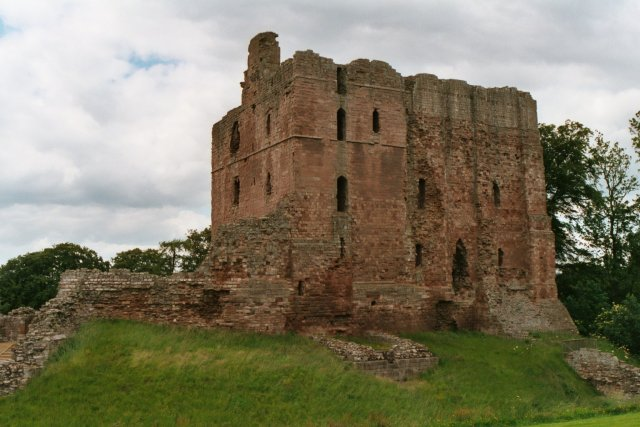

Location
- Location in Northumberland
- Coordinates: 55.722°N 2.149°W
- Grid reference: NT907475

Airfield information
- Identifiers

Norham Castle (sometimes Nornam) is a castle in Norham, Northumberland, England, overlooking the River Tweed, on the border between England and Scotland. It is a Grade I listed building and a Scheduled Ancient Monument. The castle saw much action during the wars between England and Scotland.

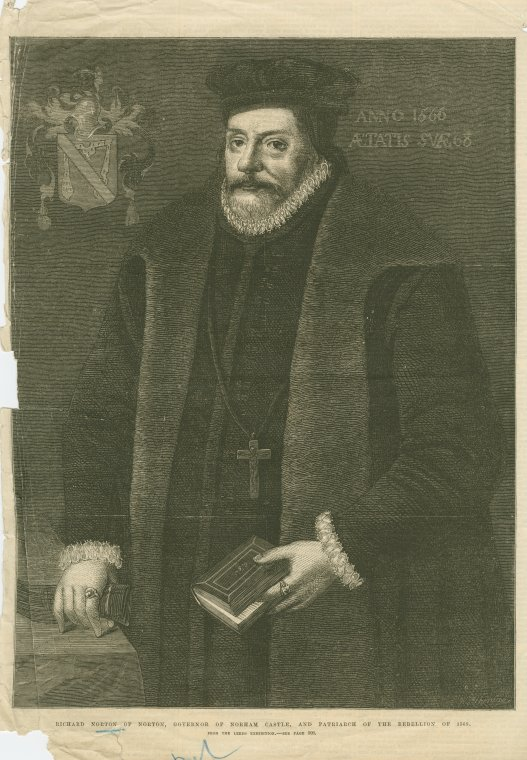

== Early history ==
The castle was founded when Ranulf Flambard, Bishop of Durham from 1099 to 1128, gave orders for its construction in 1121 to protect the property of the bishopric in north Northumberland from incursions by the Scots.

In 1136, David I of Scotland invaded Northumberland and captured the castle. It was soon handed back to the bishopric but was captured again in 1138 during another invasion. This time, the castle's structure was substantially damaged. It remained derelict until Hugh de Puiset, Bishop of Durham from 1153 to 1195, had the castle rebuilt. The work was directed by Richard of Wolviston, who was the bishop's architect.

In 1174, Hugh de Puiset supported the rebels in a revolt against Henry II, during which the Scottish king, William the Lion, invaded Northumberland. The rebels were defeated, and as a result, Bishop Hugh was forced to relinquish Norham Castle to the crown. The castle was administered by a constable appointed by the crown and garrisoned by royal soldiers. This continued until 1197, two years after Hugh's death, when it was restored to his successor, Philip of Poitou. The latter showed himself to be loyal to King John. When Philip died in 1208, the castle reverted to royal control.

== Thirteenth century ==
In 1209, the castle accommodated both King John and William the Lion on an occasion when William did homage for his English lands to the English king. Between 1208 and 1211, King John maintained the castle defences in good order and provided a strong garrison. The strong defences were needed in 1215, when Alexander II of Scotland, son of William the Lion, besieged the castle for forty days without success. In 1217, the castle was once again restored to the bishopric of Durham.

Edward I, known as the Hammer of the Scots, visited the castle more than once. He did so in 1292 when John Balliol, the King of Scotland, did homage to him there. On 29 March, 1296, Edward arrived at Norham on his way to invade Scotland. During his campaign, his queen, Marguerite of France, remained at Norham Castle.

== Fourteenth century ==
During the early fourteenth century, the Scots invaded Northumberland several times but did not always attack Norham. In 1318, Robert the Bruce besieged the castle for nearly a year. The Scottish army succeeded in occupying the outer ward for three days but was then driven out. The siege did not succeed. In 1319, the Scots returned and the castle successfully withstood a seven-month siege. In 1322, there was yet another unsuccessful Scottish siege. During all three sieges, the castle was under the command of Sir Thomas Grey of Heton, a knight who had been captured by the Scots at the Battle of Bannockburn in 1314 and who was father to the chronicler Sir Thomas Grey.

In 1327, a Scottish army captured Norham, but it was soon restored to Lewis de Beaumont, Bishop of Durham, when peace was declared.

== Fifteenth century ==
Although the first half of the fifteenth century proved to be quieter than the previous one, the castle's defences were kept in good repair. The next major activity that the castle saw was during the Wars of the Roses (1455–1487). In 1462 Norham Castle was held by the Yorkists on behalf of Edward IV. The following year, a Lancastrian army besieged the castle for eighteen days until it was relieved by Yorkist forces. In 1464, those holding the castle changed sides to support the Lancastrians but were compelled to surrender to a force of Yorkists.

Later in the century, Bishop Richard Foxe of Durham (1494–1501) had the castle's defences strengthened once more. In 1497, the castle was besieged for two weeks by an army led by James IV of Scotland. The siege included the use of artillery to try to breach the walls, but the garrison was finally relieved by an English army. Following this latest siege, the castle was repaired again. One of the guns used in the siege was a 20-inch (51 cm) calibre cannon called Mons Meg, and is now displayed at Edinburgh Castle.

== Sixteenth century ==
In 1513, James IV of Scotland invaded England again with a powerful army that included artillery. He crossed the border and moved on Norham. His guns pounded the outer defences for several days until the outer ward was taken by the Scots. Soon after, the castle surrendered. By then, most of the outer walls had been destroyed. Weeks later, James was defeated and slain at the Battle of Flodden, near Branxton in Northumberland, and Norham fell back into English hands.

The castle was inspected by Cardinal Wolsey's chaplain William Frankelayn on 29 August 1515. He found it "well fortitified with contremurs and murderers." The wall from the "dungeoun" (the Keep) running south west towards the kitchen was 28 feet thick. At this time, Scotland's Regent Albany was planning to bring an army against the Hume family on the Scottish borders.

Bishop Thomas Ruthall of Durham inspected the castle and began restoration work, which continued until 1521. William Dacre, 3rd Baron Dacre (c. 1493–1563) was Captain of Norham Castle in 1522–23. During another invasion scare from Albany, in September 1523 the Earl of Surrey, Frankelyn and Sir William Bulmer, Sheriff of Durham, viewed the defences. Surrey gave orders for new earthwork defences of platforms and rampires and the "mending of broken places with turvis and yerthe." He estimated the work would take six days and made similar orders for the repair of Wark Castle.

The steward of the Earl of Northumberland, Roger Lascelles, parleyed with the Earl of Angus and William Douglas, Abbot of Holyrood, across the Tweed on 5 September 1528. Angus was threatened by his step-son James V of Scotland and he asked Lascelles for chambers in the castle to be provided for his daughter Margaret Douglas, her governess Isobel Hoppar and the young Earl of Huntly. If necessary Angus himself would seek safety in Norham. Margaret Douglas, the grandmother of James I of England, was received at Norham in October. The Earl of Northumberland assured Cardinal Wolsey that members of the refugee Douglas family would not be allowed in the inner wards of the castle.

The castle was maintained in a state of good repair, with a strong garrison during the remaining conflicts with Scotland in that century. Brian Layton, Captain of Norham, reviewed the security of the castle in October 1542 after hearing rumours that insiders would hand the castle to the Scots. Layton invaded Scotland during the war of the Rough Wooing and was killed in February 1545 at the battle of Ancrum Moor.

Sir Richard Lee with Sir Thomas Palmer and Sir Robert Bowes surveyed the castle in 1550 and in 1554 Bishop Tunstal carried out repairs. However, when an extended state of peace existed between the two countries, the garrison was reduced and the defences were allowed to deteriorate. Lord Hunsdon had the floors of the hall, parlour and kitchen propped up with ship's masts in 1574.

By the end of the century the castle had fallen into a state of disrepair, although Cuthbert Armourer organised some repairs in 1590. In 1596 Queen Elizabeth gave the Captain, Sir Robert Carey, her “resolute answer” that she would spend nothing on Norham.

Norham was the site of regular meetings of border wardens. A meeting at the west ford of Norham in October 1597 ended in a gun fight over the River Tweed at dusk. The castle was destined not to see any further fighting, but the castle and manor were given to George Home, 1st Earl of Dunbar, by James VI of Scotland on his accession to the throne of England. The castle was left to fall into ruin.

== Nineteenth century ==
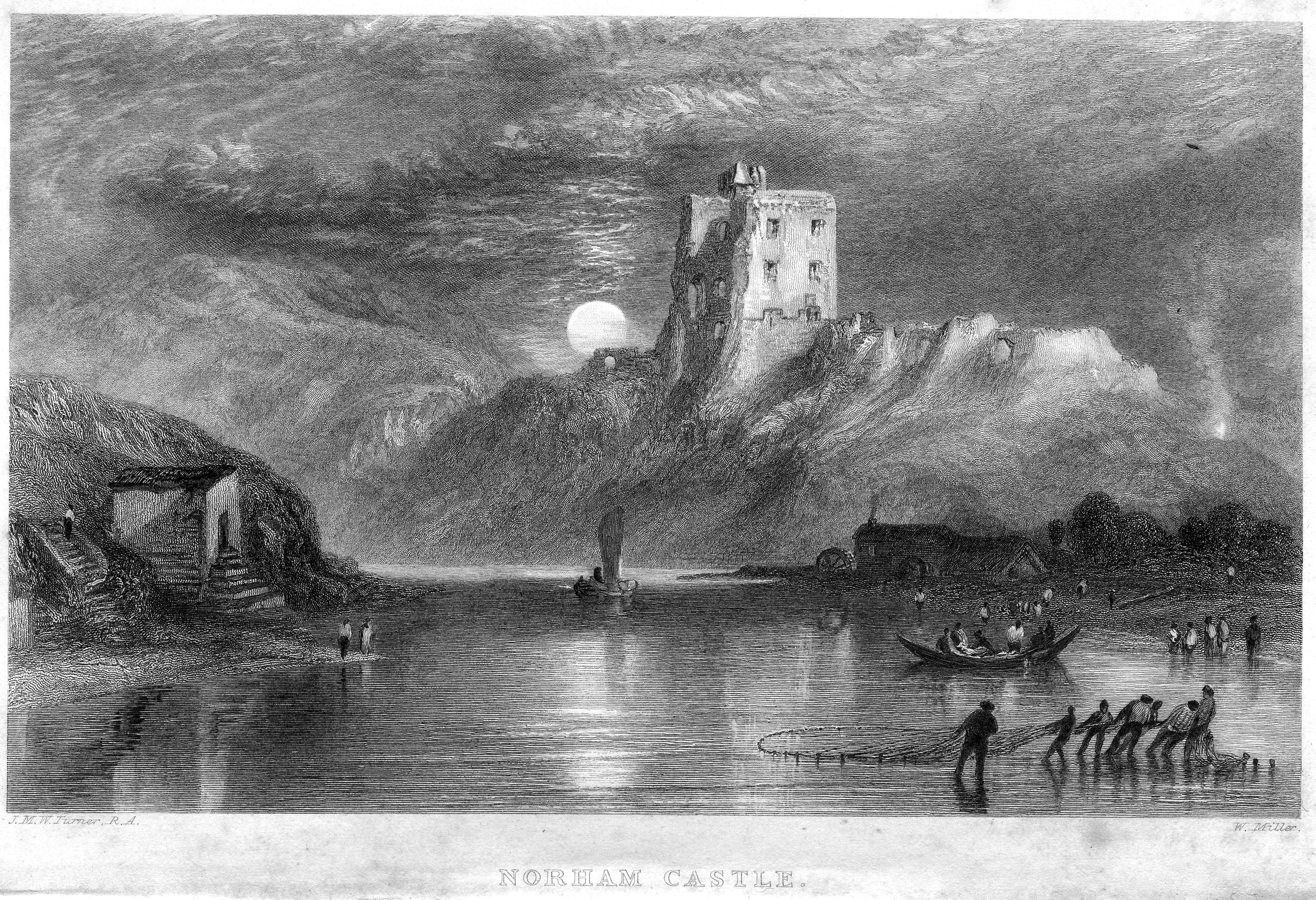
Norham Castle, 1836, moonrise engraving by William Miller after J. M. W. Turner

The surrounding area of Norham was, until 1844, an outlying part of the County Palatine of Durham, and with the shires of Island (including Holy Island and the Farnes) and Bedlington was known as North Durham.

In the 19th century, Norham Castle became well known far and wide from the paintings of J. M. W. Turner, who first painted the castle in 1797 and returned to paint it many times. Several examples of his work can be seen in the Tate Gallery in London.

== Description of the castle ==
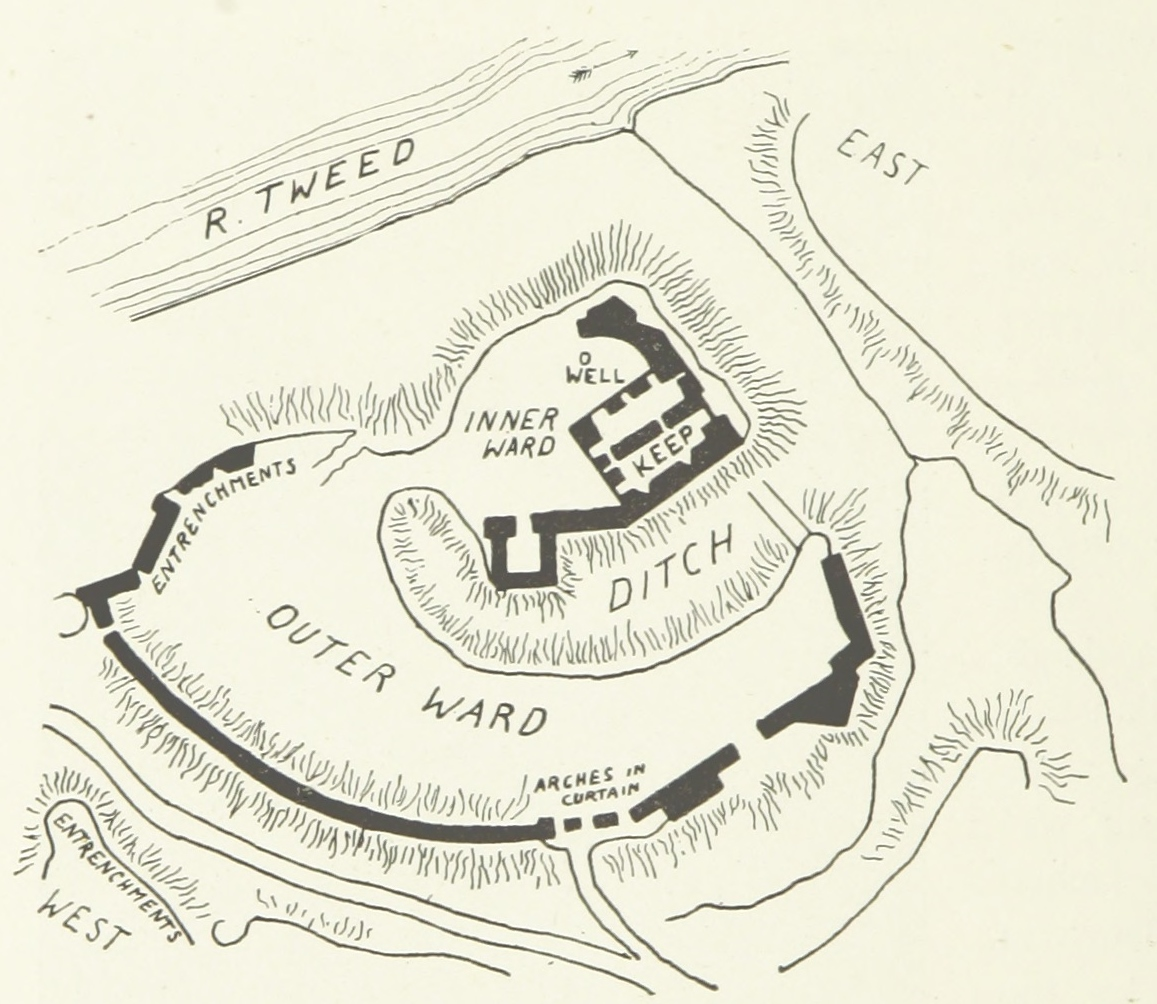
A plan of the castle from J. D. Mackenzie's The Castles of England: their story and structure

The castle stands on the south bank of the River Tweed, high above the river, with the north side protected by a steep slope. A deep ravine protected the east side, and an artificial moat was dug around the west and south sides to complete the protection. The castle had an inner and outer ward. The inner ward stood on a mound and was separated from the outer ward by a moat, crossed by a drawbridge.

The main entrance to the castle was the strongly fortified West Gate leading into the outer ward. It was protected by a stone causeway spanned by a drawbridge and is also known as Marmion's Gate. There was an additional gate to the south of the outer ward, known as the Sheep Gate.

The inner ward was entered by crossing a drawbridge across the moat and entering through a fortified gate on the west side. The drawbridge has now been replaced by a wooden bridge. On the north side of the inner ward was the bishop's hall, measuring 60 ft by 30 ft (18.3m by 9.1m), now in ruins. To the east side of the inner ward stands the keep, measuring 84 ft by 60 ft (25.6m by 18.3m) and 88 feet (26.8 m) high. The keep is said to have been built by Hugh de Puiset.

Norham Castle is now in the care of English Heritage and is open to visitors.

== See also ==
RMS Norham Castle, a Royal Mail Ship

== Sources ==
- Allsopp, Bruce; Clark, Ursula (1969). Historic Architecture of Northumberland. Newcastle upon Tyne: Oriel Press. ISBN 0 85362 062 8.
- Grundy, John (2022). History of Northumberland. Newcastle upon Tyne: Tyne Bridge Publishing. ISBN 9781838280970.

== Bibliography ==
- Bain, Joseph, ed., Hamilton Papers, vol.1 (1890), pp. 287–291, no.225, security of Norham Castle in October 1542.
- Blair, C. H. Hunter (1936). Norham Castle, Northumberland. London, H. M. Stationery off.
- Dodds, G.L., “Historic Sites of Northumberland & Newcastle upon Tyne”, 2000, Albion Press, pp 121–129, ISBN 0-9525122-1-1.
- Saunders, A. D., "Norham Castle and Early Artillery Defences", Fort (Fortress Study Group), (25), 1997, pp37–61
