= Heaton Castle =

Ruined castle in Cornhill-on-Tweed, Northumberland, England

Coordinates: 55.67067°N 2.15838°W

Heaton Castle (anciently Heton) in the parish of Cornhill-on-Tweed, Northumberland, England, is a ruined historic castle near the Scottish border.

It is situated in an elevated position above the south bank of the River Till, 4 miles north-east of Coldstream and 9 miles south-west of Berwick-upon-Tweed, and 2 miles south-east of the River Tweed, the historic border with Scotland.. The castle was slighted in 1496 by King James IV of Scotland, but remnants survive as parts of the walls of outbuildings of a farm now known as Castle Heaton.

== History ==
The castle was the seat of the de Heton family, which took its name from the place. It passed in about 1250 to a branch of the prominent de Grey family, who in 1415 rebuilt it as a quadrangular castle.

James IV of Scotland set miners to work to slight or demolish Heaton Castle on 24 September 1496, and gave his stone masons, led by John Cochrane, a bonus to work through the night. James IV brought the pretender Perkin Warbeck with him into England. They stayed some nights at Ellemford on the Whiteadder Water, and the invasion is known as the "Raid of Ellem". James IV brought his cannon to Heaton, and a horse was killed pulling a gun into position. One record of the invasion mentions the "siege of Heaton", in Latin, "obsidione de Hedtoun".

=== Description in the 16th century ===
A survey of 1541 described the castle as ruinous, though a later report noted a vault large enough to hold a hundred horses. By about 1550 the ruins had been adapted to form the base of a bastle-type building with a stone vault. The only remains surviving are two buttresses against the north-east wall of a stable-block, together with "probable remains of a turret and rampart", and the long barrel vault. In the 1580s, attempts at rebuilding and repair were made, but the project failed when the Grey family became involved in a dispute with the Crown concerning funding.

The remaining building with the long vault has some characteristics of a Bastle house, and has been compared to Akeld Bastle.

== The Grey family ==
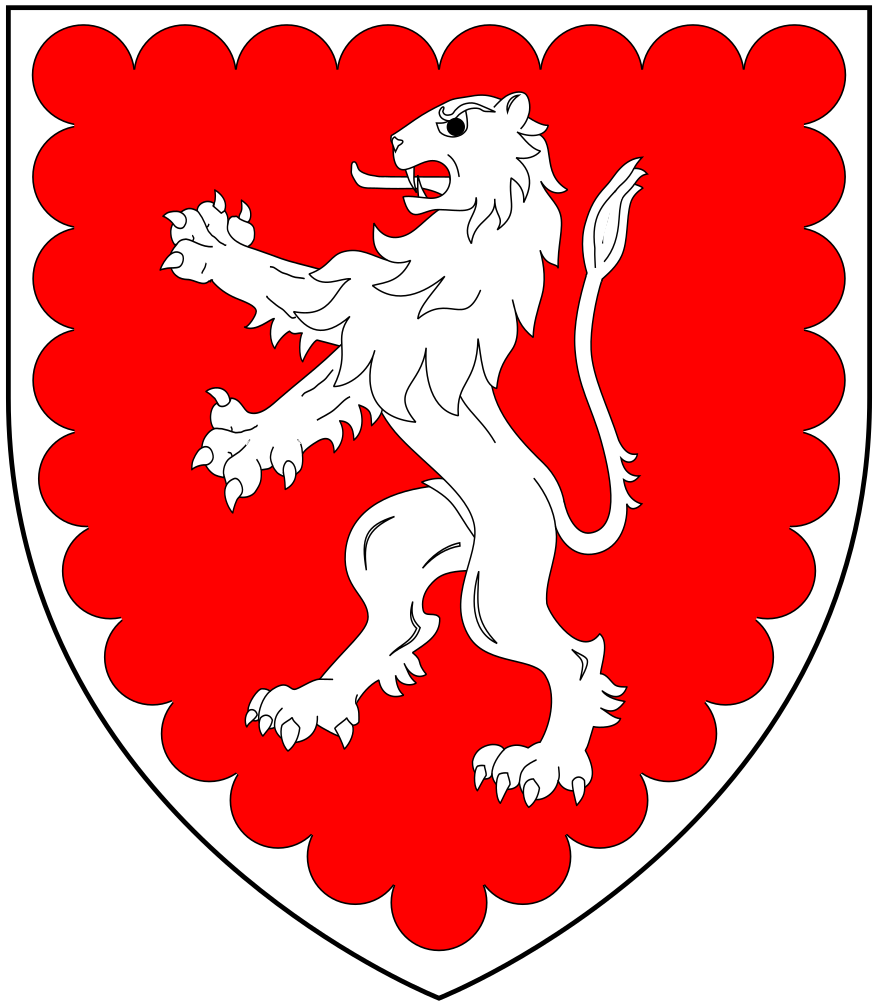
Arms of Grey of Heaton and Howick: Gules, a lion rampant a bordure engrailed argent. These arms were adopted in lieu of the ancient arms of Grey borne by all other branches of the family descended from Henry de Grey (1155-1219) of Grays Thurrock, Essex: Barry of six argent and azure

The Grey family of Heaton was descended from Hugh de Grey, a younger son of Henry de Grey (1155-1219) of Grays Thurrock in Essex, a courtier of King John, whose ancestry is traceable back to Anchetil de Greye (c.1052 - post-1086), a Norman soldier and follower of William FitzOsbern, 1st Earl of Hereford one of the great magnates of early Norman England and one of the very few proven companions of William the Conqueror known to have fought at the Battle of Hastings in 1066. The descent of the de Grey family of Heaton is as follows:

- Sir Thomas Grey (d.1344), 3rd in descent from Hugh de Grey, was an eminent soldier in the Anglo-Scottish wars in the reigns of Edward I and Edward II. He married Agnes de Bayles.
- Sir Thomas Grey (d.1369), son, "The Chronicler", who wrote the English chronicle, the Scalacronica. He married Margaret de Presson, the daughter and heiress of William de Presson of Presson, near Carham in Northumberland.
- Sir Thomas Grey (1359-1400) of Heaton and of Chillingham Castle, who married Joan de Mowbray (d.1410), sister of Thomas de Mowbray, 1st Duke of Norfolk, and daughter of John de Mowbray, 4th Baron Mowbray (d.1368) by his wife and Elizabeth de Segrave, daughter and heiress of John de Segrave, 4th Baron Segrave by his wife Margaret of Brotherton (c.1320-1399), suo jure 'Countess of Norfolk, in 1397 created Duchess of Norfolk for life, the daughter and eventual sole heiress of Thomas of Brotherton, eldest son of King Edward I of England, by his second marriage. In 1338 she succeeded to the Earldom of Norfolk and the office of Earl Marshal. His second son was John Grey, 1st Earl of Tankerville (1384-1421), KG.
- Sir Thomas Grey (1384-1415), son, one of the three conspirators in the Southampton Plot against King Henry V in 1415. In about 1408 he married Alice Neville, a daughter of Ralph Neville, 1st Earl of Westmorland, by his first wife Margaret de Stafford (d.1396), a daughter of Hugh de Stafford, 2nd Earl of Stafford.
- Sir Thomas Grey (1404-1426), who in 1412, at eight years of age, was betrothed to Isabel, then three years of age, only daughter of Richard of Conisburgh, 3rd Earl of Cambridge, and Anne Mortimer; they had one son. At about this time the family abandoned Heaton and moved to its other estate at Howick in Northumberland. His descendants gained peerage titles including: Baronet Grey of Chillingham, Northumberland (1619); Baron Grey of Werke (1623/4); Baronet Grey of Howick (1746); Baron Grey of Howick (1801); Viscount Howick (1806); Earl Gret (1806). His most notable descendant was Charles Grey, 2nd Earl Grey, 2nd Viscount Howick (1764-1845), KG, of Howick Hall, Prime Minister and supposed inventor of the famous tea.

=== History of the broader de Grey family ===
The de Grey family was descended from Anchetil de Greye (c.1052 - post-1086), a Norman soldier and follower of William FitzOsbern, 1st Earl of Hereford, one of the great magnates of early Norman England and one of the very few proven companions of William the Conqueror known to have fought at the Battle of Hastings in 1066. Anchetil de Greye is regarded as the ancestor of the noble House of Grey, branches of which held many peerage titles in England, including Baron Grey de Wilton, Baron Grey of Codnor, Baron Grey de Ruthyn, Marquess of Dorset, Duke of Suffolk, and Earl of Stamford. They married into the royal family.

Descendants of the branch seated at Heaton gained the peerage titles of: Earl of Tankerville (1419, 1695), Baronet Grey of Chillingham, Northumberland (1619); Baron Grey of Werke (1623/4); Viscount Glendale (1695), Baronet Grey of Howick (1746); Baron Grey of Howick (1801); Viscount Howick (1806), Earl Grey (1806) and Baronet Grey of Fallodon (1814). Charles Grey, 2nd Earl Grey, 2nd Viscount Howick (1764-1845), KG, of Howick Hall, Prime Minister, and supposed inventor of the famous tea, was a descendant of the Heaton branch.

== Present ==
In 2011 the estate of Castle Heaton (with Shellacres) was offered for sale at an asking price of £11.5 million, a record for recent years in the North East.

== Sources ==
- King, Andy (2005). "Scaling the Ladder: The Rise and Rise of the Grays of Heaton, c.1296-c.1415". In Liddy, Christian D. (ed.). North-east England in the Later Middle Ages. Woodbridge: Boydell Press. pp. 57–74.
- Pugh, T.B. (1988). Henry V and the Southampton Plot of 1415. Alan Sutton. ISBN 0-86299-541-8
- Richardson, Douglas (2011). Magna Carta Ancestry: A Study in Colonial and Medieval Families, ed. Kimball G. Everingham. Vol. II (2nd ed.). Salt Lake City.ISBN 1449966381
- Richardson, Douglas (2011). Magna Carta Ancestry: A Study in Colonial and Medieval Families, ed. Kimball G. Everingham. Vol. III (2nd ed.). Salt Lake City.
