= John de Clavering =

13th-14th century English nobleman

Arms of John de Clavering as shown in Caerlaverock Roll (1301): Quarterly, or and gules overall a bend sable, a label of three points vert.

John de Clavering (died 1332), Lord of Clavering, was an English noble.

== Life ==
John was the eldest son of Robert fitzRoger and Margaret de la Zouch. He fought with his father at the Battle of Falkirk in 1298 and the Siege of Caerlaverock in 1300. John was captured during the Battle of Bannockburn in 1314. John died in 1332 and was buried in Langley Abbey, Norfolk, England

== Marriage and issue ==
John married Hawise, daughter of Robert de Tiptoft and Eve Chaworth, they are known to have had the following issue:

- Eve de Clavering, married firstly Thomas de Audley, without issue. She married secondly Thomas de Ufford, had issue. She married thirdly James Audley, had issue. For her fourth marriage, she married Robert de Benhale, with no issue.
