= RMS Norham Castle =

Royal Mail Ship

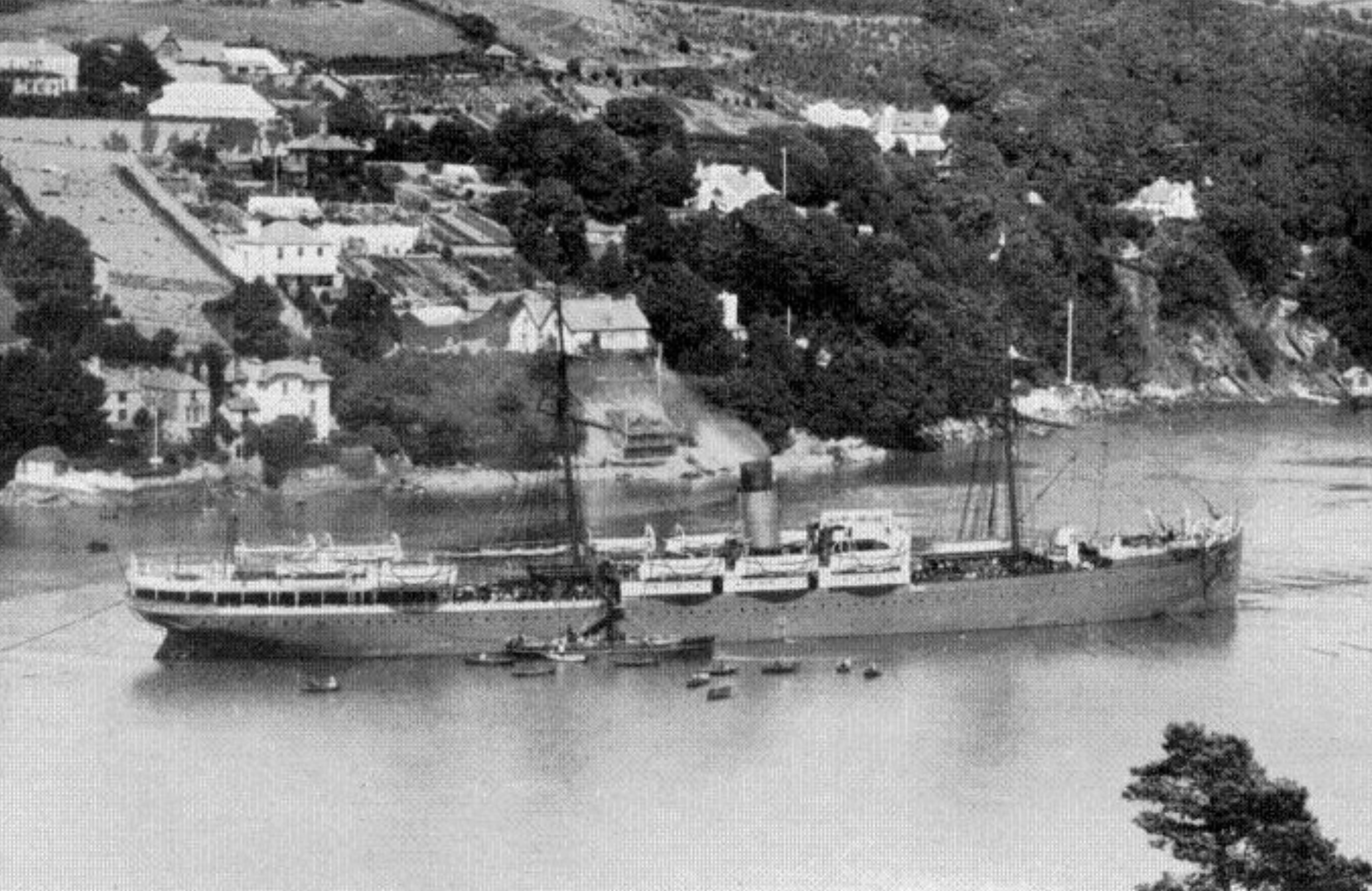
- RMS Norham Castle

History

United Kingdom
- Name: Norham Castle
- Owner: Union-Castle Line
- Operator: D Currie & Co, London
- Port of registry: London
- Builder: John Elder & Co., Glasgow
- Yard number: 270
- Launched: 26 February 1883
- Completed: 16 May 1883
- Identification: 87101
- Fate: Broken up in Italy in 1932
- Notes: Sold to France in 1903 and renamed Martinique

General characteristics
- Tonnage: 4,241 GRT; 2,722 NRT
- Length: 380 ft. 6 in.
- Beam: 48 ft 2 in (14.68 m)
- Depth: 31.4 ft.
- Installed power: 600 nhp
- Propulsion: As built: Iron Screw Steamer; C2cyl (50, 90 v 60in) 600nhp, 1-screw; 1891 engine tripled by Fairfield Shipbuilding Co.; T3 cyl 36", 60 1/2", 96"x60" 4500ihp
- Speed: Cruising: 12 kn (22 km/h; 14 mph)
- Capacity: As built: unk. first class passengers; unk. second class passengers; unk. third class passengers

The RMS Norham Castle was a Royal Mail Ship and passenger liner of the Union-Castle Line in service between London, England and Cape Town, South Africa between 1883 and 1903, named after Norham Castle.

In her first year the ship was in the Java Sea in the western Pacific Ocean when the island of Krakatoa exploded in August 1883. A series of eruptions emitted vast quantities of smoke and ash and plunged the area into darkness, and waves destroyed a lighthouse and other structures. Shortly after 10:00 in the morning of 27 August the final explosion destroyed the island with a blast that was heard and felt thousands of miles away. The pressure wave from that blast ruptured the eardrums of over half of the crew of Norham Castle.

In 1897 the ship was reviewed by Queen Victoria at Spithead during her Diamond Jubilee celebration, and was later used by the Prince of Wales when he started a grand yacht race from her deck. Also, in April 1897, Sir Alfred Milner traveled aboard the Norham Castle from Southampton to Cape Town, to take up the reins as the new High Commissioner of South Africa.

The ship was sold to the French line Compagnie Générale Transatlantique (General Transatlantic Company) in 1903, and renamed the Martinique. She served the Bordeaux, France – West Indies route until 1931.
