= Robert de Tiptoft =

13th century English noble

Arms of Robert Tibetot: Argent, a saltire engrailed gules, as shown in the Segar Roll (c.1282).

Robert de Tiptoft (also Tibetot; died 1298, Nettlestead), Lord of Nettlestead, Carbrooke and Langar, was an Anglo-Norman landowner and soldier.

Robert was appointed governor of Porchester Castle in 50 Henry III (1265–66). He accompanied Edward I on Lord Edward's crusade to the Holy Land in 1270. He was made governor of Nottingham Castle in 1275. Edward I (1280–81) he was appointed justice of South Wales and governor of Cardigan and Carmarthen Castles. Tiptoft was responsible for the compulsory introduction of "English customs" in South Wales which then prompted the revolt of Rhys ap Maredudd in 1287–88.

Tiptoft took a leading part in the suppression of the revolt of Rhys ap Maredudd. Robert took Rhys's chief castle of Newcastle Emlyn, captured him in 1291, and sent him to York, where Rhys was hanged and drawn. Tiptoft was appointed one of John of Brittany's counsellors and lieutenants in the expedition to Gascony in 1294.

Robert was sent to negotiate an alliance with Sancho IV of Castile, and placed in command of Rions. Tiptoft was forced to surrender Rions, after a siege by a French army, led by Charles, Count of Valois, on 7 April 1295. Tiptoft took part in Edward I's Scottish expedition of 1296, and died at his manor of Nettlestead on 22 May 1298.

== Marriage and issue ==
Tiptoft married Eva, daughter of Patrick de Chaworth and Hawise de Londres, they are known to have had the following known issue:

- Ada Tiptoft, married John de Mohun, had issue.
- Robert Tiptoft (died c.1297)
- Eve Tiptoft, married Robert de Tateshall, had issue.
- Hawise Tiptoft, married John de Clavering, had issue.
- Payn Tiptoft (died 1314), married Agnes de Ros, had issue.
