= Thomas de Ufford (died 1314) =

13th-14th century English noble

Arms of Thomas de Ufford: Sable a cross engrailled or, in dexter chief a crescent argent, as shown in the Gelre Roll.

Thomas de Ufford (died 1314), Lord of Wrentham, was an English noble. He was killed during the Battle of Bannockburn against the Scots on 23 or 24 June 1314.

He was a younger son of Robert de Ufford, Justiciar of Ireland. Thomas fought at the Battle of Bannockburn in 1314, where he was killed. He was buried at Langley Abbey, Norfolk.

== Marriage and issue ==
Thomas married Eve, the widow of Thomas de Audley, she was the daughter of Sir John de Clavering and Hawise de Tibetot, they are known to have had the following known issue:

- John de Ufford, without issue.
- Robert de Ufford, married Margaret de Hederst, without issue.
- Edmund de Ufford, married Sibyl de Pierrepoint, had issue.
