= Contramure =

In military fortification, a contramure, or countermure, is a wall raised behind another to supply its place when breached or destroyed.

The term was also used to refer to an outer wall built around the wall of a city.
