= Battle of Bannockburn =

1314 battle during the First War of Scottish Independence

- Part of the First War of Scottish Independence
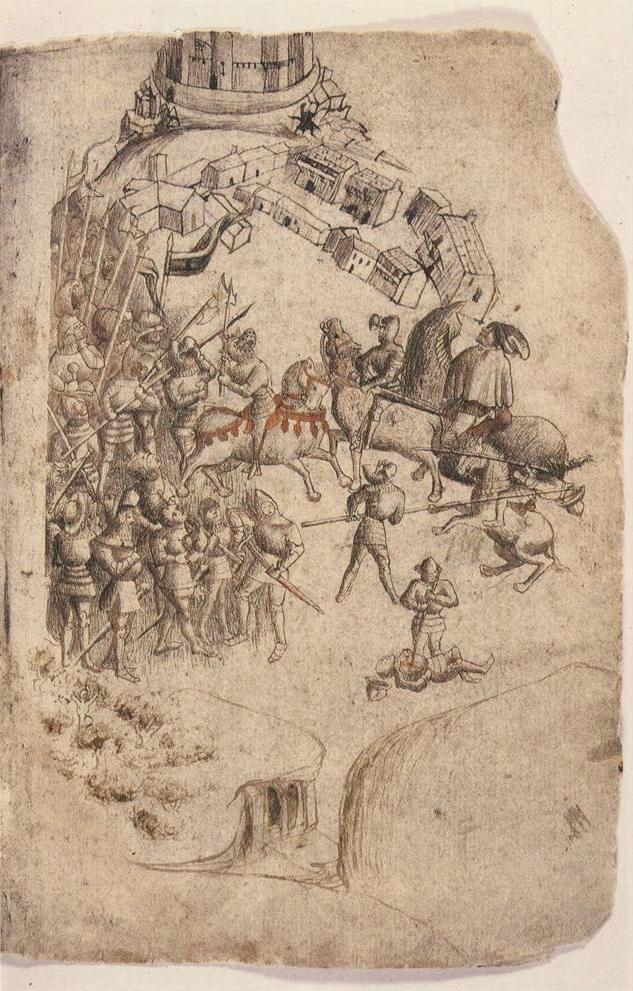
- This depiction from the Scotichronicon (c. 1440) is the earliest-known image of the battle. King Robert wielding an axe and Edward II fleeing toward Stirling feature prominently, conflating incidents from the two days of battle. Corpus Christi College, Cambridge
Date	23–24 June 1314
Location	Bannockburn, south of Stirling, Scotland 56°05′36″N 03°56′16″W
Result	Scottish victory

Belligerents
Kingdom of Scotland	Kingdom of England

Commanders and leaders
King Robert I (Scotland) Edward Bruce (Scotland) Sir Robert Keith (Scotland) Lord of Douglas (Scotland) Earl of Moray (Scotland) Sir Gilbert Hay (Scotland) Walter Stewart (Scotland) Angus Og MacDonald; (Scotland) Sir Alexander Seton	King Edward II; (Kingdom of England) Earl of Hereford (surrendered); (Kingdom of England) Earl of Pembroke; (Kingdom of England) Earl of Gloucester †; (Kingdom of England) Baron Clifford †; (Kingdom of England) Henry Beaumont

Strength
(Scotland) 5,000–8,000	(England) 20,000–25,000

Casualties and losses
Light (presumably around 100 casualties)	700 knights and men-at-arms killed; 15,000 killed or drowned

Registered battlefield
- Designated: 21 March 2011
- Reference no.: BTL4

The Battle of Bannockburn (Scottish Gaelic: Blàr Allt nam Bànag or Blàr Allt a' Bhonnaich) was fought on 23–24 June 1314, between the army of Robert the Bruce, King of Scots, and the army of King Edward II of England, during the First War of Scottish Independence. It was a decisive victory for Robert Bruce and formed a major turning point in the war, which ended 14 years later with the de jure restoration of Scottish independence under the Treaty of Edinburgh–Northampton. For this reason, the Battle of Bannockburn is widely considered a landmark moment in Scottish history.

King Edward II invaded Scotland after Bruce demanded in 1313 that all supporters still loyal to ousted Scottish king John Balliol acknowledge Bruce as their king or lose their lands. Stirling Castle, a Scots royal fortress occupied by the English, was under siege by the Scottish army. King Edward assembled a formidable force of soldiers to relieve it—the largest army ever to invade Scotland. The English summoned 25,000 infantry soldiers and 2,000 horses from England, Ireland and Wales against 6,000 Scottish soldiers, that Bruce had divided into three different contingents. Edward's attempt to raise the siege failed when he found his path blocked by a smaller army commanded by Bruce.

The Scottish army was divided into four divisions of schiltrons commanded by (1) Bruce, (2) his brother Edward Bruce, (3) his nephew, Thomas Randolph, the Earl of Moray, and (4) one jointly commanded by Sir James Douglas and the young Walter the Steward. Bruce's friend, Angus Og Macdonald, Lord of the Isles, brought thousands of Islesmen to Bannockburn, including galloglass warriors, and King Robert assigned them the place of honour at his side in his own schiltron with the men of Carrick and Argyll.

After Robert Bruce killed Sir Henry de Bohun on the first day of the battle, the English withdrew for the day. That night, Sir Alexander Seton, a Scottish noble serving in Edward's army, defected to the Scottish side and informed King Robert of the English camp's low morale, telling him they could win. Robert Bruce decided to launch a full-scale attack on the English forces the next day and to use his schiltrons as offensive units, as he had trained them. This was a strategy his predecessor William Wallace had not employed. The English army was defeated in a pitched battle which resulted in the deaths of several prominent commanders, including the Earl of Gloucester and Sir Robert Clifford, and capture of many others, including the Earl of Hereford.

The victory against the English at Bannockburn is one of the most celebrated in Scottish history, and for centuries the battle has been commemorated in verse and art. The National Trust for Scotland operates the Bannockburn Visitor Centre (previously known as the Bannockburn Heritage Centre). Though the exact location for the battle is uncertain, a modern monument was erected in a field above a possible site of the battlefield, where the warring parties are believed to have camped, alongside a statue of Robert Bruce designed by Pilkington Jackson. The monument, along with the associated visitor centre, is one of the most popular tourist attractions in the area.

== Background ==
Edward I had wanted to expand England to prevent a foreign power such as France from capturing territories in the British Isles. But he needed Scotland's allegiance, which led to his campaign to capture Scotland. The Wars of Scottish Independence between England and Scotland began in 1296. Initially, the English were successful under the command of Edward I: they won victories at the Battle of Dunbar (1296) and at the Capture of Berwick (1296). The removal of John Balliol from the Scottish throne also contributed to the English success. However, the Scots defeated the English at the Battle of Stirling Bridge in 1297. This was countered by Edward I's victory at the Battle of Falkirk (1298). By 1304, Scotland had been conquered, but in 1306 Robert the Bruce seized the Scottish throne and the war was reopened.

After the death of Edward I in 1307, his son Edward II of England was crowned as king, but was incapable of providing the determined leadership his father had shown, and the English position soon became more difficult.

In 1313, Bruce demanded the allegiance of all remaining Balliol supporters, under threat of losing their lands. He also demanded the surrender of the English garrison at Stirling Castle, one of the most important castles held by the English, as it commanded the route north into the Scottish Highlands. It was besieged in 1314 by Bruce's younger brother Edward Bruce, and the English decided that if the castle was not relieved by mid-summer it would be surrendered to the Scots.

The English could not ignore this challenge, and prepared and equipped a substantial campaign. Edward II requested from England, Wales and Ireland 2,000 heavily armoured cavalry and 13,000 infantry. It is estimated that no more than half the infantry actually arrived, but the English army was still by far the largest ever to invade Scotland. The Scottish army probably numbered around 7,000 men, including no more than 500 mounted troops. Unlike the English, the Scottish cavalry was probably not equipped for charging enemy lines and suitable only for skirmishing and reconnaissance. The Scottish infantry was likely armed with axes, swords and pikes, and included only a few bowmen.

The precise numerical advantage of the English forces relative to the Scottish forces is unknown, but modern researchers estimate that the Scottish faced English forces one-and-a-half to three times their number.

== Prelude ==
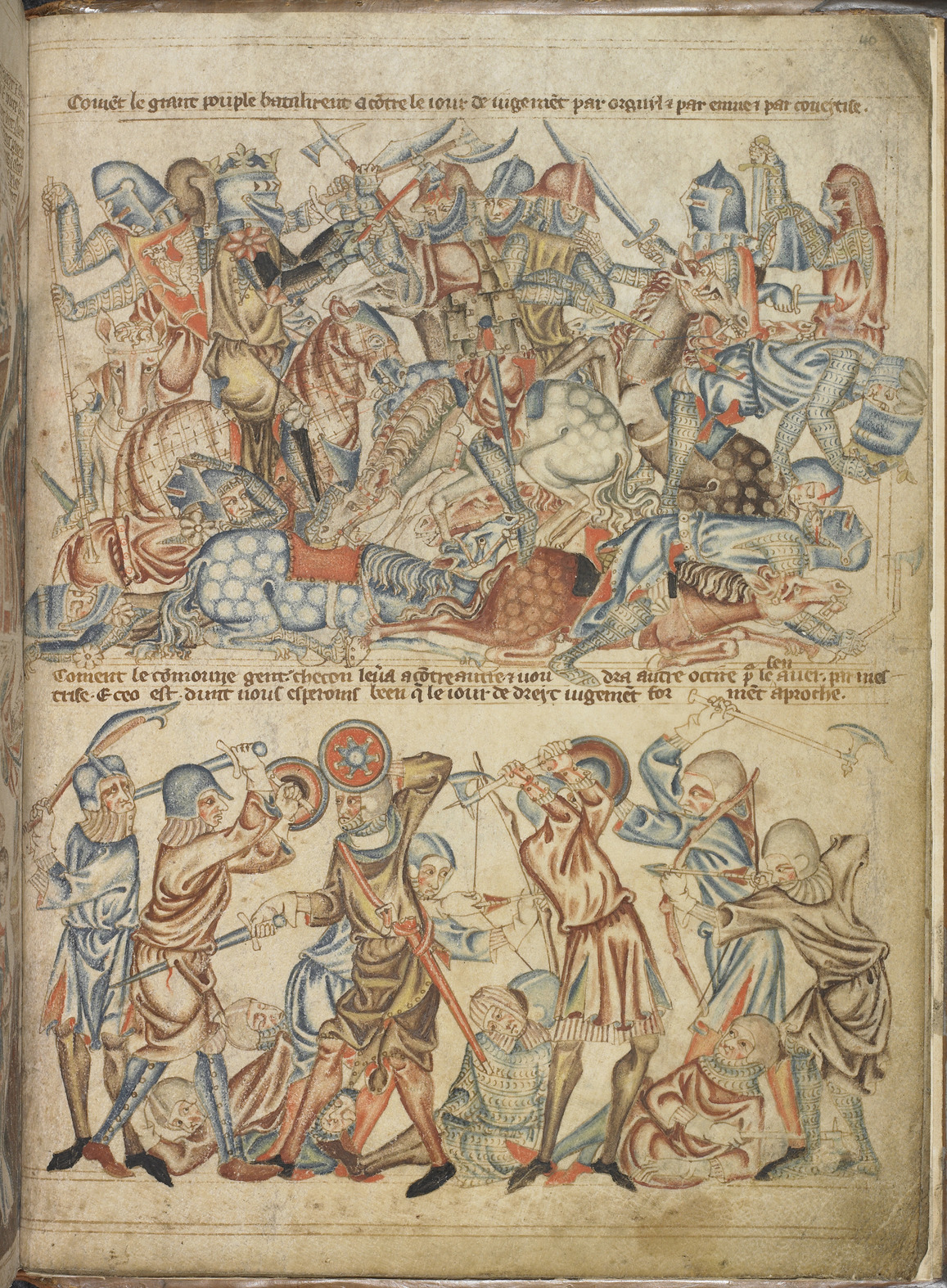
Holkham Bible, c. 1330: Depiction of a biblical battle, giving an impression of how soldiers were equipped at Bannockburn.

On the morning of 23 June 1314 it was still not certain if a battle was going to take place. The armies were still eight miles apart, giving King Robert the Bruce enough time to decide whether to move northwards beyond the Forth or westwards up the river into a district of mosses and hills. Robert knew that the latter decision would influence the plans of Edward II and his lords. Given the declared objective and the advancing march the previous week, it was obvious that the English would continue their advance on Stirling. In an effort to "rescue" Stirling, Edward II continued to hurry his troops: they marched seventy miles in one week. Many historians criticise Edward II for this move, as he was not acting as a leader of a well-trained army but was instead acting like a pilgrim. This bad decision-making by Edward II led to horses, horsemen, and infantry becoming extremely worn out with toil and hunger.

Now Edward II was within reach of Stirling. Edward II and his advisors began to make plans for the upcoming battle. Edward and his advisors knew the places where the Scots were likely to challenge them, and sent orders for their troops to prepare for an enemy established in boggy ground near the River Forth, near Stirling. The English appear to have advanced in four divisions. The Scots assembled defensive formations known as schiltrons, which were strong defensive squares of men with pikes. Thomas Randolph, 1st Earl of Moray, commanded the Scottish vanguard, which was stationed about a mile south of Stirling, near the church of St. Ninian, while the king commanded the rearguard at the entrance to the New Park. His brother Edward led the third division. The fourth division was nominally under the youthful Walter the Steward, but actually under the command of Sir James Douglas. The Scottish archers used yew-stave longbows and, while these were equal to English longbows in strength, there were probably fewer Scottish archers, possibly only 500 although there is no evidence as to their number. These archers played little part in the battle. There is first-hand evidence in a poem, written just after the battle by the captured Carmelite friar Robert Baston, that one or both sides employed slingers and crossbowmen.

== Battle ==
=== Location of the battlefield ===
The exact site of both days of the battle has been debated extensively, but most modern historians agree that the traditional site for the first day, where a visitor centre and statue have been erected, is not correct.

A large number of alternative locations for the second day have been considered, but modern researchers typically consider only two to be worthy of consideration:

- An area of ground to the south of Balquhiderock Wood, known as the Dryfield, about 0.75 miles (1.2 km) east of the traditional site.
- The Carse of Balquhiderock (to the north of the wood), known as the Wetfield, about 1.5 miles (2.4 km) north-east of the traditional site. This location is accepted by the National Trust as the most likely site.

It is likely that wherever the fighting began it ended on the Carse.

=== Importance ===
This battle was an attempt by Robert the Bruce to legitimise his kingship through combat. An article by Medieval Warfare states, "Robert Bruce, King of Scots from 1306 until his death in 1329 aged around 55, was no stranger to the battlefield. He waged war to wear down his Scottish opponents and the English regime in Scotland, culminating in the Battle of Bannockburn in 1314, to legitimise his kingship and free his kingdom." It was a battle that Robert the Bruce hoped would confirm his place on the throne of Scotland and force Edward II to recognize him King. Bruce also faced internal struggles for the crown of Scotland among the "Balliols, Bruces, and the Scottish political nation in a decades-long contest for the crown." As stated by W. M. Mackenzie, "The victory at Bannockburn is of more than national interest and had other results than those immediately affecting Scotland. With Falkirk and Courtrai (1302), where the Flemish footman shattered the chivalry of France—and more than either of these it initiated the change which was to come over the mediaeval art of war, in demonstrating the superiority of infantry properly handled to the mounted men-at-arms upon whom the entire stress of fighting had hitherto been laid. The defeated were quick to learn their lesson and apply it in their own way. This shows the sheer importance of the Scottish spearman on the European stage as many countries began to adapt to this infantry dominated medieval battleground. They were moving away from cavalry and more towards the domination of the foot soldier. Another aspect is that this battle was for the rights to Stirling Castle essentially. Robert the Bruce did not want to give the castle up to the English as it was a major staging point. This is supported by Herbert Maxwell who stated that "Bruce's position was taken up to bar King Edwards access to Stirling."

=== First day of battle ===
An interpretation of the battle of Bannockburn – first day

Most medieval battles were short-lived, lasting only a few hours, so the Battle of Bannockburn is unusual in that it lasted two days. Shortly before the battle, King Robert picked a flat field flanked by woodland known as New Park to set up camp for the upcoming battle. This was because the woodland gave Bruce and his foot soldiers an advantage since the English were very adept at cavalry. The Scots split their army into four divisions and the Bruce commanded the four divisions to form a diamond formation. Bruce covered the rear to the south, Douglas to the east, Randolph to the north (the direction of Stirling), with 500 horsemen under Keith to the west, in reserve. On 23 June 1314, two English cavalry formations advanced. The first was commanded by the Earl of Gloucester and by the Earl of Hereford. They followed behind a smaller detachment of roughly 300 soldiers led by Sir Robert Clifford and Sir Henry de Beaumont who marched closer to the River Forth. Both of these detachments marched in front of the main fighting force. These two detachments were tasked with lifting the siege on Stirling. The Hereford-Gloucester force was the first to cross over the Bannockburn and marched toward the woodlands that hid the Scots and stood in the way of the English on their way to Stirling. Little did the English know that Bruce had ventured ahead away from his natural protection. King Robert was not then fully armed for combat, but was instead armed for reconnaissance with only a small horse, light armour, and a battle axe to defend himself. The Earl of Hereford's nephew Henry de Bohun spotted the king so poorly equipped and took advantage. Henry de Bohun charged forward in full combat gear with his lance, encountering Bruce's troops. Bruce and de Bohun faced off in what became a celebrated instance of single combat. Bohun charged at Bruce and, when the two passed side by side, Bruce split Bohun's head with his axe. However the Vita Edwardi Secundi gives a different account:

'On Sunday, which was the vigil of St John's day, as they [the English] passed by a certain wood and were approaching Stirling Castle, the Scots were seen straggling under the trees as if in flight, and a certain knight, Henry de Boune pursued them with the Welsh to the entrance of the wood. For he had in mind that if he found Robert Bruce there he would either kill him or carry him off captive. But when he had come thither, Robert himself came suddenly out of his hiding-place in the wood, and the said Henry seeing that he could not resist the multitude of Scots, turned his horse with the intention of regaining his companions; but Robert opposed him and struck him on the head with an axe that he carried in his hand. His squire, trying to protect or rescue his lord, was overwhelmed by the Scots.'

The Scots then rushed the English forces under Gloucester's and Hereford's command, who retreated, struggling back over the Bannockburn.

This story is important because it was a reflection of Robert the Bruce's leadership. It is stated in an article by Sidney Dean that "While controversial among his peers, Bruce earned the respect of his soldiers by leading from the front and displaying physical courage."

The second English cavalry force was commanded by Robert Clifford and Henry de Beaumont. Their forces included Sir Thomas de Grey of Heaton, father of the chronicler Thomas Grey. The younger Grey described the battle:

Robert Lord de Clifford and Henry de Beaumont, with three hundred men-at-arms, made a circuit upon the other side of the wood towards the castle, keeping the open ground. Thomas Randolph, 1st Earl of Moray, King Robert's nephew, who was the leader of the Scottish advanced guard, hearing that his uncle had repulsed the advanced guard of the English on the other side of the wood, thought that he must have his share, and issuing from the wood with his division marched across the open ground towards the two afore-named lords.

Sir Henry de Beaumont called to his men: "Let us wait a little; let them come on; give them room".

"Sir," said Sir Thomas Gray, "I doubt that whatever you give them now, they will have all too soon".

"Very well" exclaimed the said Henry, "if you are afraid, be off".

"Sir," answered the said Thomas, "it is not from fear that I shall fly this day."

So saying, he spurred in between Beaumont and Sir William Deyncourt and charged into the thick of the enemy. William was killed, Thomas was taken prisoner, his horse being killed on the pikes, and he himself carried off with the Scots on foot when they marched off, having utterly routed the squadron of the said two lords. Some of the English fled to the castle, others to the king's army, which having already left the road through the wood had debouched upon a plain near the water of Forth beyond Bannockburn, an evil, deep, wet marsh, where the said English army unharnessed and remained all night, having sadly lost confidence and being too much disaffected by the events of the day.

— Sir Thomas Grey, Scalacronica, translated by Herbert Maxwell

=== Second day of battle ===
An interpretation of the battle of Bannockburn – second day

During the night, the English forces crossed the stream known as the Bannockburn, establishing their position on the plain beyond it. A Scottish knight, Alexander Seton, who was fighting in the service of Edward II of England, deserted the English camp and told Bruce that English morale was low and encouraged him to attack.

In the morning, the Scots advanced from New Park. Not long after daybreak, Edward was surprised to see the Scottish pikemen emerge from the cover of the woods and advance towards his position. As Bruce's army drew nearer, they paused and knelt in prayer. Edward reportedly said in surprise, "They pray for mercy!" "For mercy, yes," one of his attendants replied, "but from God, not you. These men will conquer or die."

The Earl of Gloucester had argued with the Earl of Hereford over who should lead the vanguard into battle. He had also tried to persuade the king that the battle should be postponed. This led the king to accuse him of cowardice. Goaded by the accusation, Gloucester advanced to meet the Scots. Few accompanied Gloucester and, when he reached the Scottish lines, he was quickly surrounded and killed.

The English were gradually pushed back and ground down by the Scots' schiltrons. The English longbowmen attempted to support the advance of the knights, but were ordered to stop shooting to avoid additional friendly fire. The English then attempted to deploy their English and Welsh longbowmen to flank the advancing Scots, but they were dispersed by 500 Scottish cavalry under the marischal Sir Robert Keith. (Although the Scottish cavalry is sometimes described as light cavalry, this appears to be a misinterpretation of Barbour's statement that these were men-at-arms on lighter horses than those of their English counterparts.)

The English cavalry was hemmed in against the Bannockburn, making it difficult for them to manoeuvre. Unable to hold their formations, they broke rank. It soon became clear to Aymer de Valence and Giles d'Argentan (reputedly the third-best knight in Europe) that the English had lost the battle and Edward II needed at all costs to be led to safety. Seizing the reins of the king's horse, they dragged him away, closely followed by 500 knights of the royal bodyguard.

Once they were clear of the battle, d'Argentan turned to the king and said: "Sire, your protection was committed to me, but since you are safely on your way, I will bid you farewell for never yet have I fled from a battle, nor will I now." He turned his horse to charge back into the ranks of Scottish, where he was overborne and slain.

=== English retreat ===
Edward fled with his personal bodyguard and panic spread among the remaining troops, turning their defeat into a rout. King Edward, with about 500 men, first fled for Stirling Castle where Sir Philip de Moubray, commander of the castle, turned him away as the castle would shortly be surrendered to the Scots. Then, pursued by James Douglas and a small troop of horsemen, Edward fled to Dunbar Castle, from which he took a ship to Berwick. From the carnage of Bannockburn, the rest of the army tried to escape to the safety of the English border, 90 miles (140 km) south. Many were killed by the pursuing Scottish army or by the inhabitants of the countryside they passed through.

Historian Peter Reese wrote that "only one sizeable group of men—all foot soldiers—made good their escape to England." These were a force of Welsh spearmen who were kept together by their commander, Sir Maurice de Berkeley. The majority of them reached Carlisle. Weighing the available evidence, Reese concludes that "it seems doubtful if even a third of the foot soldiers returned to England." If his estimate is accurate, of 16,000 English infantrymen, about 11,000 were killed. The English chronicler Thomas Walsingham gave the number of English men-at-arms who were killed as 700, while 500 more men-at-arms were spared for ransom. The Scottish losses appear to have been comparatively light, with only two knights among those killed.

== Aftermath ==
The immediate aftermath was the surrender of Stirling Castle, one of Scotland's most important fortresses, to King Robert. He then slighted (razed) it to prevent it from being retaken. Nearly as important was the surrender of Bothwell Castle, where a sizeable party of English nobles, including the Earl of Hereford, had taken refuge. At the same time, the Edwardian strongholds of Dunbar and Jedburgh were also being captured. By 1315, only Berwick remained outside of Robert's control. In exchange for the captured nobles, Edward II released Robert's wife Elizabeth de Burgh, sisters Christina Bruce, Mary Bruce and daughter Marjorie Bruce, and Robert Wishart, Bishop of Glasgow, ending their eight-year imprisonment in England. Following the battle, King Robert rewarded Sir Gilbert Hay of Erroll with the office of hereditary Lord High Constable of Scotland.

The defeat of the English opened up the north of England to Scottish raids and allowed the Scottish invasion of Ireland. These finally led, after the failure of the Declaration of Arbroath to secure diplomatic recognition of Scotland's independence by the Pope, to the Treaty of Edinburgh–Northampton in 1328. Under the treaty, the English crown recognised the independence of the Kingdom of Scotland, and acknowledged Robert the Bruce as the rightful king.

== Notable casualties ==
The following are the notable casualties and captives of the battle.

=== Deaths ===
- Gilbert de Clare, 8th Earl of Gloucester
- Sir Giles d'Argentan
- John Lovel, 2nd Baron Lovel
- John Comyn, Lord of Badenoch
- Robert de Clifford, 1st Baron Clifford
- Sir Henry de Bohun
- William Marshal, Marshal of Ireland
- Edmund de Mauley, King's Steward
- Sir Robert de Felton of Litcham, 1st Lord
- Malduin (Malcolm) MacGilchrist, 3rd Lord of Arrochar
- William de Vescy of Kildare
- John de Montfort, 2nd Baron Montfort
- Payn Tibetoft, 1st Baron Tibotot
- William de Hastelegh
- Edmund Hastings, 1st Baron Hastings
- Miles de Stapleton
- Simon Ward
- Michael de Poinyng
- Thomas de Ufford
- John de Elsingfelde
- Ralph de Beauchamp

=== Captives ===
- Humphrey de Bohun, 4th Earl of Hereford
- John Segrave, 2nd Baron Segrave
- Maurice de Berkeley, 2nd Baron Berkeley
- Thomas de Berkeley
- Sir Marmaduke Tweng
- Ralph de Monthermer, 1st Baron Monthermer
- Robert de Umfraville, Earl of Angus
- Sir Anthony de Luci
- Sir Ingram de Umfraville
- Sir John Maltravers, 1st Baron Maltravers
- Sir Thomas de Grey of Heaton
- William le Latimer
- John Giffard
- Giles de Beauchamp
- Gilbert de Bohun
- Thomas de Ferrers
- Roger Corbet
- John Bluwet
- Bartholomew de Enefeld
- John Cysrewast
- John de Clavering

== Legacy ==
=== Bannockburn Visitor Centre ===
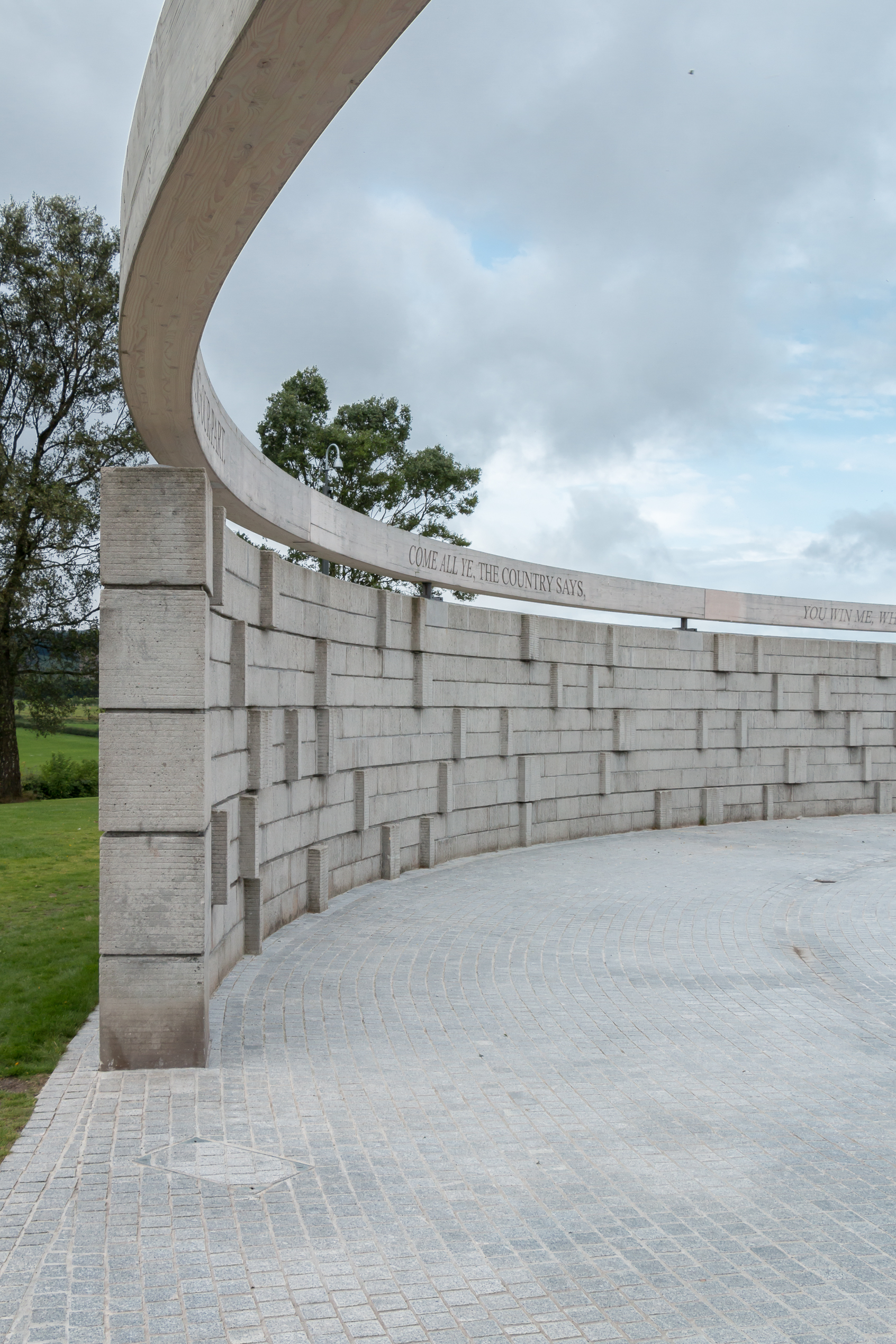
The hemicircle of the modern Bannockburn monument

In 1932 the Bannockburn Preservation Committee, under Edward Bruce, 10th Earl of Elgin and Kincardine, presented lands to the National Trust for Scotland. Further lands were purchased in 1960 and 1965 to facilitate visitor access. A modern monument was erected in a field above the possible site of the battle, where the warring parties are believed to have camped on the night before the battle. The monument consists of two semicircular walls depicting the opposing parties. Nearby stands the 1960s statue of Bruce by Pilkington Jackson. Although the statue was conceived by Pilkington Jackson he commissioned Thomas Taylor Bowie of the Ontario College of Art in Toronto to create the statue. The monument, and the associated visitor centre, are some of the most popular tourist attractions in the area. The battlefield has been included in the Inventory of Historic Battlefields in Scotland and protected by Historic Scotland under the Historic Environment (Amendment) Act 2011.

The National Trust for Scotland operates the Bannockburn Visitor Centre (previously known as the Bannockburn Heritage Centre), which is open daily from March through October. On 31 October 2012 the original building was closed for demolition and replacement by a new design, inspired by traditional Scottish buildings, by Reiach and Hall Architects. The project is a partnership between the National Trust for Scotland and Historic Environment Scotland, funded by the Scottish Government and the Heritage Lottery Fund. The battlefield's new visitor centre—now rebranded as the Bannockburn Visitor Centre—opened in March 2014. One of the attractions created by a £9m redevelopment of the centre and the nearby battlefield memorial is a computerised multiplayer game.

On 11 June 2020, during the George Floyd protests in the United Kingdom, the statue was defaced with graffiti.

=== Music ===
The German heavy metal band Grave Digger included a song called "The Battle Of Bannockburn" on their 1998 album Knights of the Cross.

In 2016 Swedish power metal band Sabaton released a song, "Blood of Bannockburn", on their album The Last Stand about this battle.

=== Arts ===
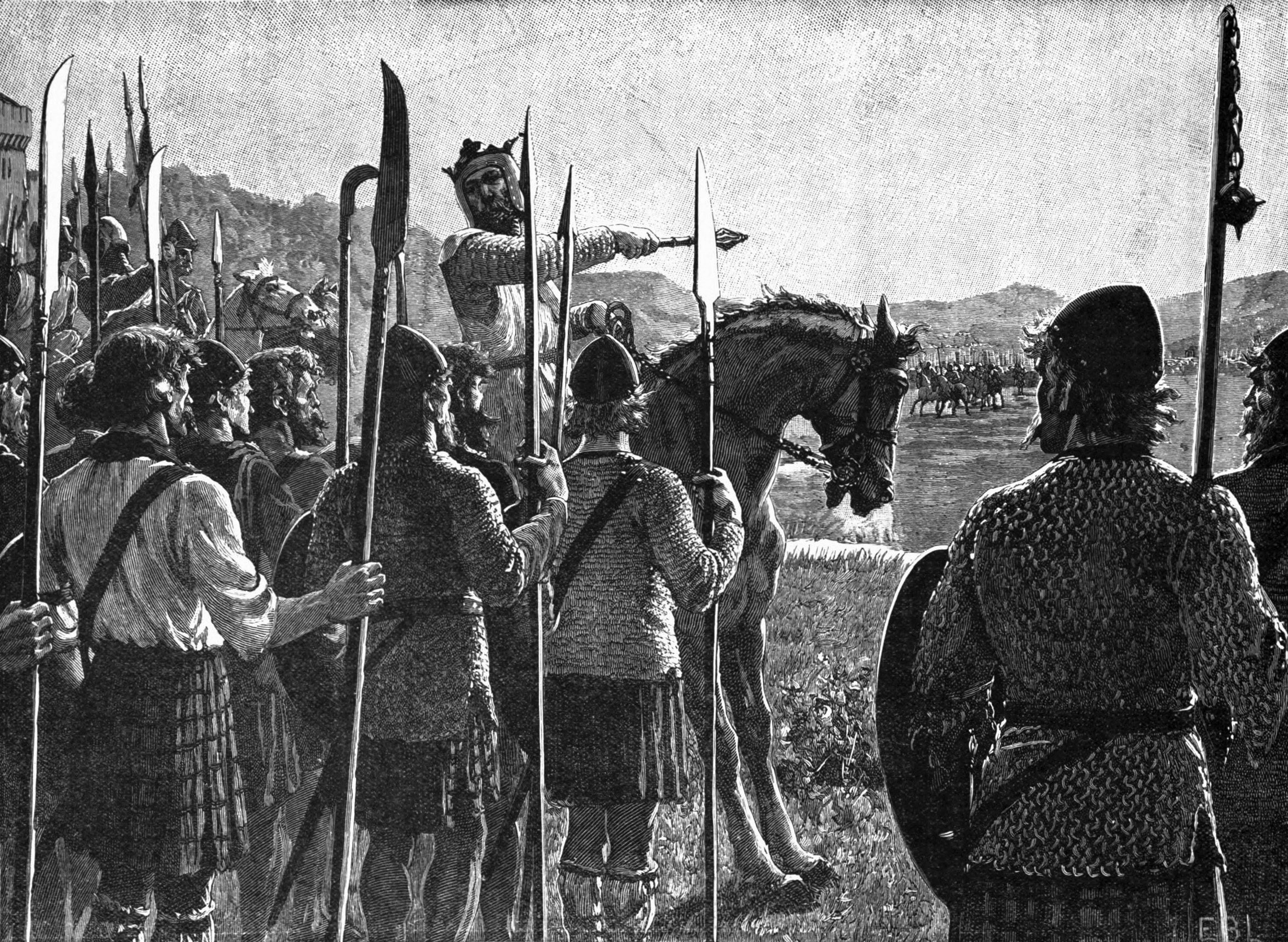
Bruce addresses his troops, from Cassell's History of England.

"Scots Wha Hae" is the title of a patriotic poem by Robert Burns. The chorus of Scotland's unofficial national anthem Flower of Scotland refers to Scotland's victory over Edward and the English at Bannockburn.

Many artworks depict the battle. John Duncan and Eric Harald Macbeth Robertson both painted Bruce's encounter with de Bohun. John Phillip painted Bruce receiving the sacrament on the eve of the battle. John Hassall painted a similar theme. A painting by William Findlay depicts Bruce at the battle.

== Gallery ==
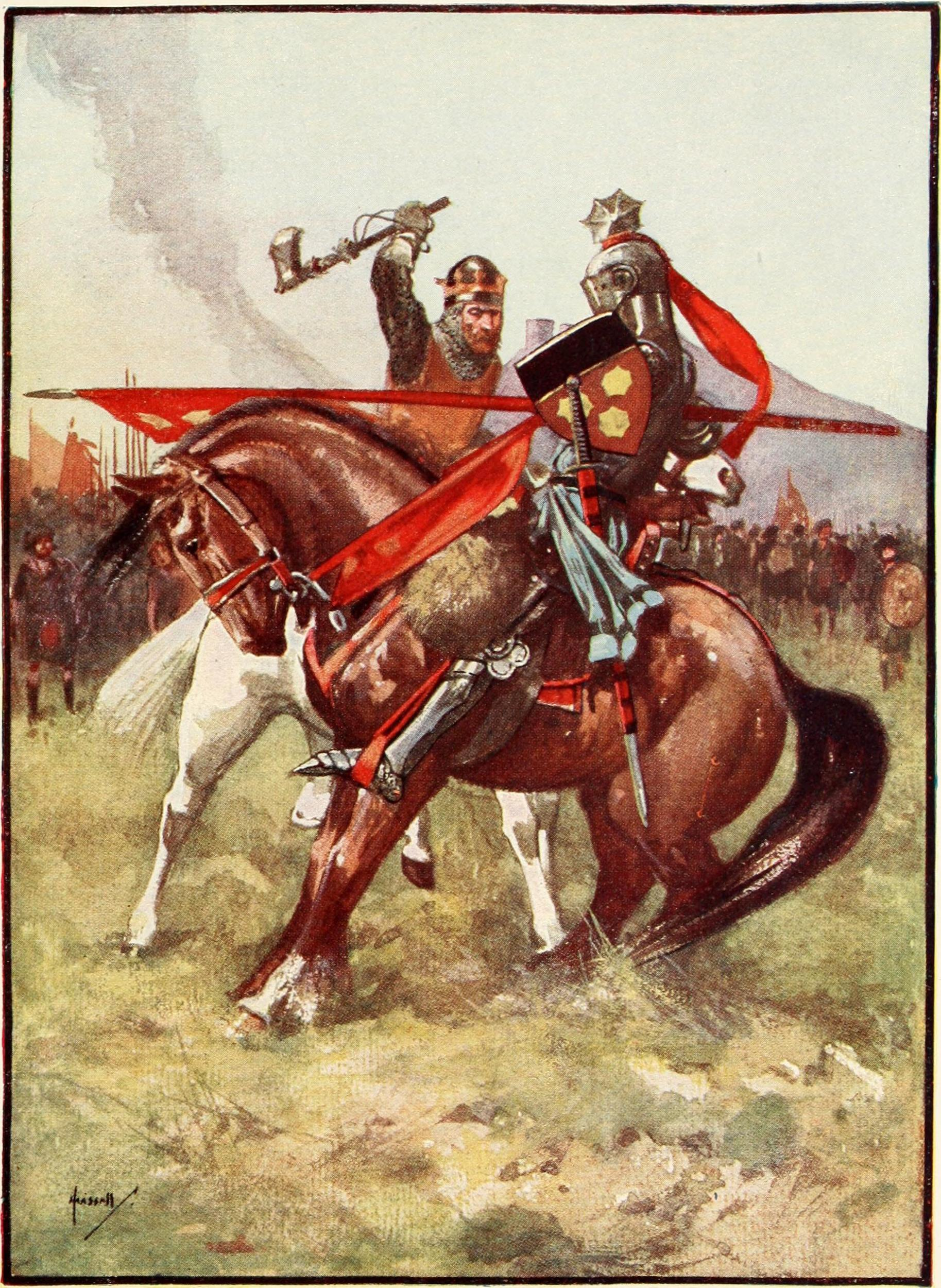
Illustration of the parry between Robert the Bruce and Sir Henry de Bohun

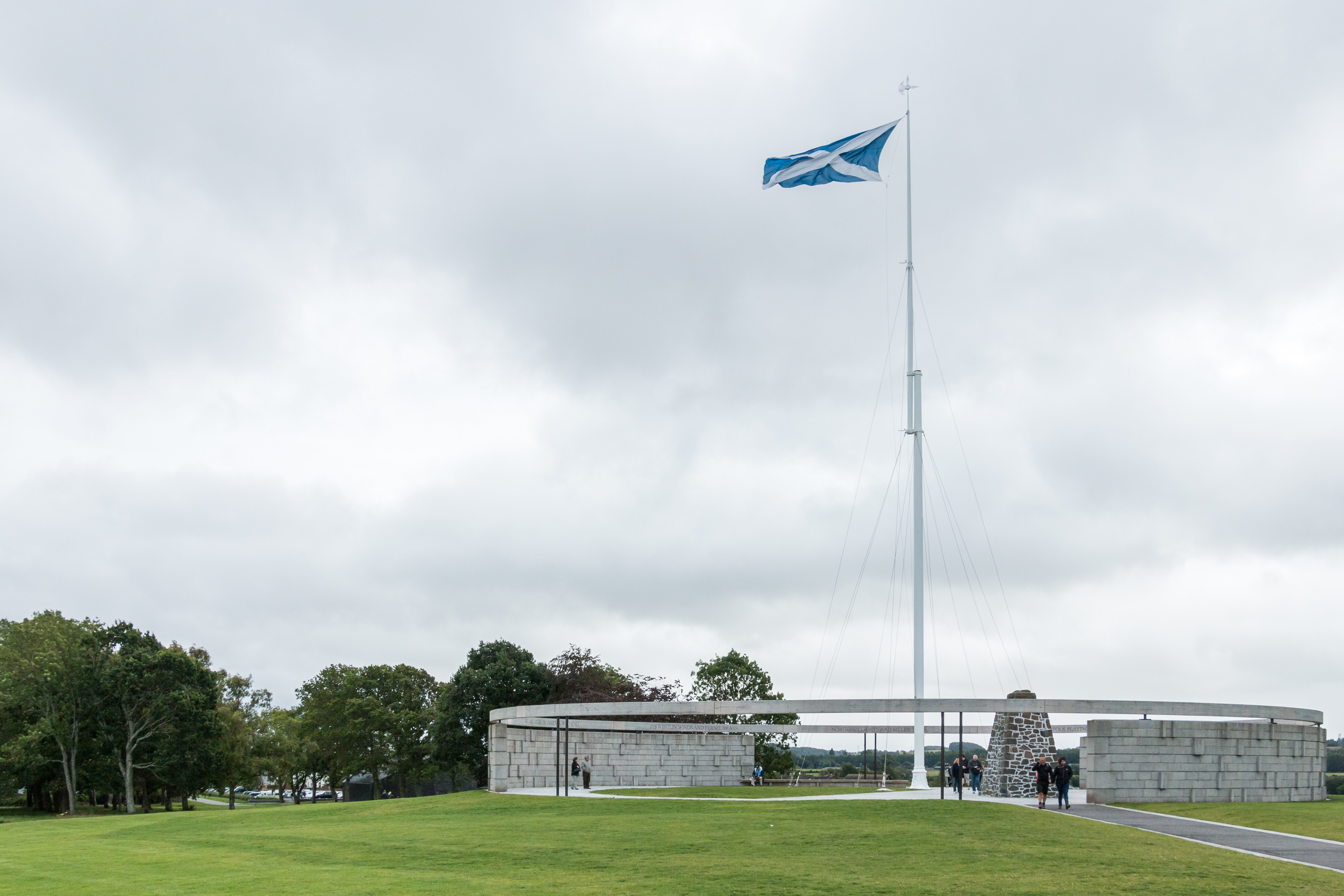
View of the circular walls and the flag pole

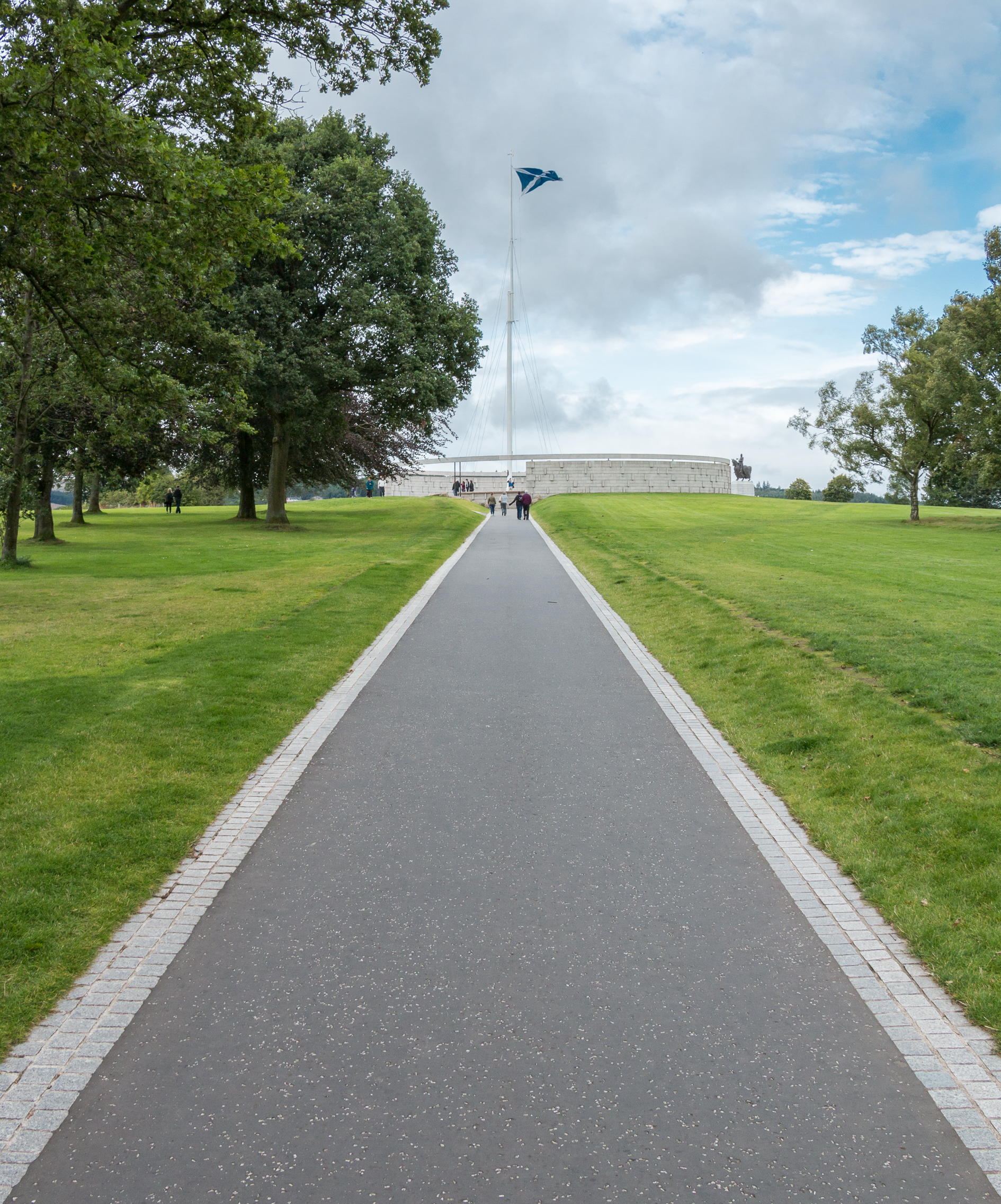
Alley to the monument

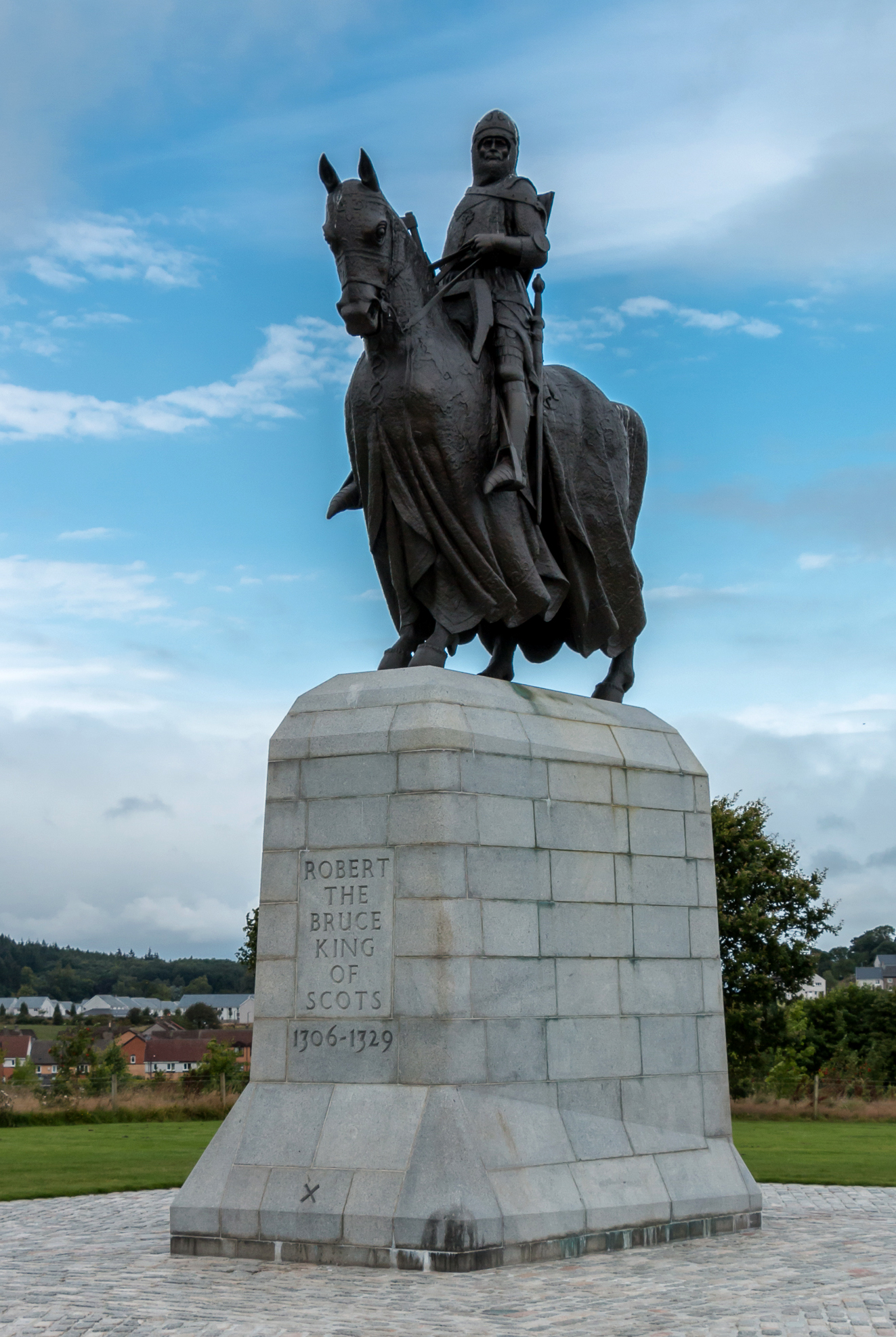
Statue of Robert the Bruce by Pilkington Jackson

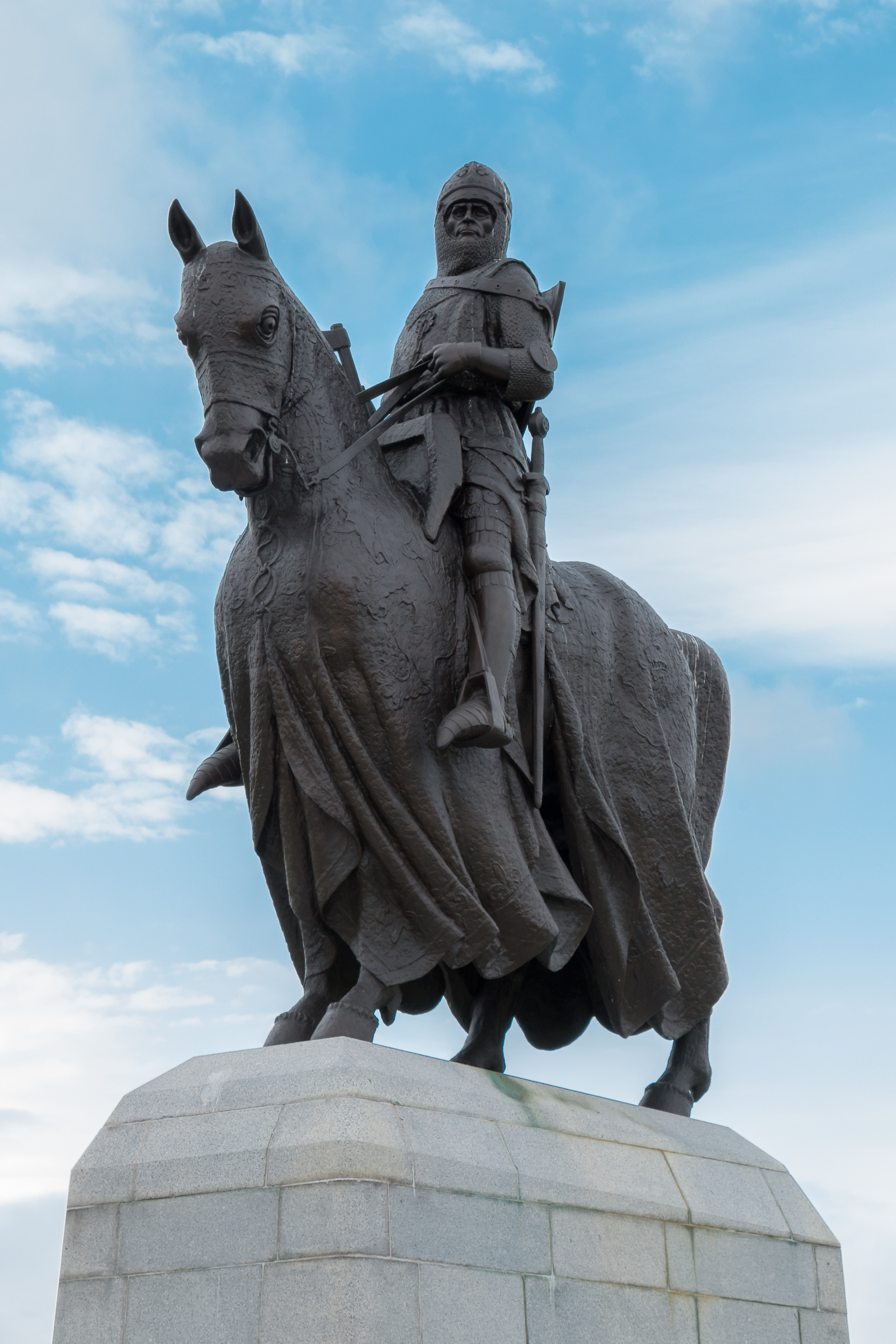
Close-up of the statue

== Sources ==
=== Primary ===
- Barbour, John, The Brus, trans. A. A. M. Duncan, 1964.
- Bower, Walter, Scotichronicon, ed. D. E. R. Watt, 1987–1993.
- Scalacronica; The reigns of Edward I, Edward II and Edward III as Recorded by Sir Thomas Gray. Translated by Maxwell, Herbert. Glasgow: James Maclehose & Sons. 1907.
- Lanercost Chronicle, edited and translated by H. Maxwell, 1913.
- Vita Edwardi Secundi [Life of Edward the Second], ed. N. D. Young, 1957.
- Walsingham, Thomas, Historia Anglicana.

=== Secondary ===
- Armstrong, Pete (illustrated by Graham Turner), Bannockburn 1314: Robert Bruce's Great Victory, Osprey Publishing, 2002 ISBN 1855326094
- Barrow, G. W. S., Robert Bruce and the Community of the Realm of Scotland, 1988, ISBN 0852246048
- Brown, C.A., "Bannockburn 1314", History Press, Stroud, 2008, ISBN 978-0752446004.
- Brown, C.A., Robert the Bruce. A life Chronicled.
- Brown, Michael (2008). Bannockburn. The Scottish War and the British Isles 1307–1323. Edinburgh: Edinburgh University Press.
- Brown, M., Wars of Scotland
- Chisholm, Hugh, ed. (1911). "Bannockburn" . Encyclopædia Britannica (11th ed.). Cambridge University Press.
- Cornell, David (2009). Bannockburn: The Triumph of Robert the Bruce. Yale University Press. ISBN 978-0300145687.
- Mackenzie, W. M., Bannockburn: A Study in Medieval Warfare, The Strong Oak Press, Stevenage 1989 (first published 1913), ISBN 1871048036
- MacNamee, Colm, The Wars of the Bruces: Scotland, England and Ireland, 1306-1328, 2001.
- Moffat, Alistair, Bannockburn: The Battle for a Nation, 2014.
- Nicholson, R., Scotland – the Later Middle Ages, 1974.
- Prestwich, M., The Three Edwards: War and State in England, 1272–1377, 1980.
- Ramsay, J. H., The Genesis of Lancaster, 1307–99, 1913.
- Reese, P., Bannockburn, Canongate, Edinburgh, 2003, ISBN 1841954659
- Scott, Ronald McNair (1982). Robert the Bruce King of Scots. London: Hutchinson & Co.
- Webster, Bruce (2015). "Robert I (Robert Bruce)". In Crowcroft, Robert; Cannon, John (eds.). The Oxford companion to British history (Second ed.). Oxford, United Kingdom; New York, NY: Oxford University Press. ISBN 9780191757150.
