= Scalacronica =

English chronicle

The Scalacronica (1066–1363) is a chronicle written in Anglo-Norman French by Sir Thomas Grey of Heaton near Norham in Northumberland. It was started whilst he was imprisoned by the Scots in Edinburgh Castle, after being captured in an ambush in October 1355, and completed in England after his release. The chronicle documents the history of Britain until 1363, and is one of the few early chronicles written by a layman.

== Overview ==
The only extant medieval manuscript of the Scalacronica is MS 133 held by Corpus Christi College, Cambridge, where it originally formed part of the bequest of Archbishop Matthew Parker, a former Master of the college and a collector of manuscripts. During the reign of King Henry VIII the antiquary John Leland prepared an abstract of the Scalacronica which he included in his Collectanea. This abstract has proven useful as the original manuscript currently lacks part of the material for the years 1339 and 1356, and all the material from 1340 to 1355, the years in which the author himself had direct experience of events. In addition, at some time before 1567, Nicholas Wotton, Dean of Canterbury, made numerous extracts from the Salacronica (BL MS Harley 902). No complete edition of the original manuscript of the Salacronica has been published, although an edition published in Edinburgh in 1836 (edited by Joseph Stevenson for the Maitland Club) contains the text dealing with the period after the Norman Conquest.

The title of the Scalacronica is not only an allusion to one of its principal sources, the Polychronicon of Ranulf Higden, but also a pun on Grey's surname, as the Norman French word gree meant "step" or "stair", as did the Latin scala, and the title could thus be translated as the "Scaling-Ladder Chronicle", the ladder being a Grey family badge.

In the allegorical prologue to the Scalacronica, Grey relates a dream in which Thomas of Otterbourne holds a five-runged ladder, the symbolism of which is explained by a sibyl. The first four rungs represent the four historians, Walter of Oxford, Bede, Ranulf Higden and John of Tynemouth, whose work is to be the inspiration for the first four parts of the book, while the fifth rung represents the future. However, as King notes, although the prologue sets out a plan for a history of Britain, the Scalacronica is a universal chronicle from the creation of the world which includes summaries of the histories of Israel, Troy, and Rome, and within each part chronicles events not only in England and Scotland, but also in Rome, Germany, France, and Spain. The chief historical value of the work is in the parts dealing with the reigns of King Edward I, King Edward II, and King Edward III which draw on the personal experience of both the author and his father, also Thomas Grey, as soldiers in the Anglo-Scottish and French wars during those reigns.

== Publication ==
The translation of the chronicle by Sir Herbert Maxwell, 7th Baronet was published in 1907. The next fully edited and translated edition of the chronicle was made by Andy King and published by the Surtees Society in 2005.

== See also ==
- List of English chronicles
