= Thomas Grey (chronicler) =

14th-century English chronicler

Sir Thomas Grey
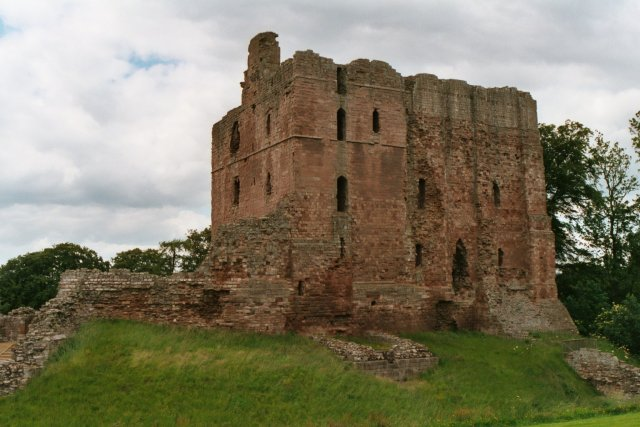
- Norham Castle
- Died: before 22 October 1369
- Spouse: Margaret de Presfen (Pressene)
- Children: Sir Thomas Grey; Elizabeth Grey; Agnes Grey
- Parent(s): Sir Thomas Grey; Agnes de Bayles

Sir Thomas Grey or Gray (d. before 22 October 1369) of Heaton Castle in the parish of Cornhill-on-Tweed, Northumberland, was the son of Sir Thomas Grey, an eminent soldier in the Anglo-Scottish wars in the reigns of Edward I and Edward II, and his wife, Agnes de Bayles. He was the author of the English chronicle, the Scalacronica.

== Family ==
Thomas Grey, author of the Scalacronica, was the son of Sir Thomas Grey of Heaton (d. before 12 March 1344) and his wife Agnes de Bayles.

Grey had four sisters, who according to Andy King married John de Eure, William de Felton, William Heron, and Gerard Salvayn.

Grey's father served almost continuously during the Anglo-Scottish wars in the reigns of Edward I and Edward II. In May 1297 Grey's father was left for dead on the field when William Wallace attacked Lanark, but recovered, and was active in various campaigns in the ensuing years. In May 1303 the elder Grey was captured by the Scots at Melrose Abbey, and after his release was at the siege of Stirling Castle the following spring, where he rescued Henry de Beaumont, with whom he was closely associated for much of his career. Later, at Bannockburn, Grey's father was taken prisoner by the Scots in a skirmish on 23 June 1314, the day before the main battle. He was constable of Norham Castle from 1319 to 1331, and appears to have died shortly before 12 March 1344.

== Career ==
Grey had already been knighted before his father's death, and according to King, likely served in Scotland alongside his father in the 1330s, and may have had his first experience of war in August 1332 as part of a private expedition into Scotland mounted by a group of noblemen and gentry known as the "Disinherited", which culminated in a battlefield victory at Dupplin Moor.

In June 1338 Grey took out letters of protection to accompany William Montagu, 1st Earl of Salisbury on a military expedition to Flanders, and in 1340 served on the Scottish Marches.

In March 1344 "in consideration of his good service beyond the seas as well as within", Grey was made warden of the manor of Middlemast Middleton in Coquetdale, which had come into the King's hands by forfeiture, and was also the recipient of several other smaller grants. On 8 January 1345 he was appointed Constable of Norham Castle, and on 10 April of that year had livery of the family manor of Heaton. According to King, Grey also acquired a great deal of additional land, and left his estate much better than he found it, and was likely the builder of Heaton Castle.

In 1345 Grey received letters of protection to accompany an expedition to Sluys, which ultimately came to nothing, and in October 1346 fought at the Battle of Neville's Cross, for which he and others received personal letters of thanks from King Edward III.

In August 1355, during a sally from Norham Castle, Grey and one of his sons were ambushed and captured at Nesbit by the Scots.

As is this case with most military encounters, this clash of arms did not meet the definition of a "battle", though it is frequently referred to as one Battle of Nesbit Muir. Grey was held captive at Edinburgh Castle, and before 25 November 1356 wrote to King Edward III pleading for help in paying his ransom. He had been released by 15 August 1357, and in October 1357 was given custody of John Gray, one of the hostages for the ransom of King David of Scotland.

According to Archer, in August 1359 Grey is thought to have accompanied King Edward's eldest son and heir, Edward, the Black Prince, to France. Grey was made Warden of the East Marches in October 1367, and is thought to have died sometime before 22 October 1369.

== Writings ==
While in captivity at Edinburgh, Grey started to write the Scalacronica, a chronicle in Anglo-Norman French in five parts, which relates both universal and English history from the earliest times. He was released in 1356 and continued to work on it back in England up until the year 1362. The chief historical value of the work is in the parts dealing with the reigns of King Edward I, King Edward II, and King Edward III which draw on the personal experience of both the author and his father as soldiers in the Anglo-Scottish and French wars during those reigns.

== Marriage and issue ==
In about 1353 Grey married Margaret de Presson, the daughter and heiress of William de Presson of Presson, Northumberland. They had at least one son and three daughters:

- Ivetta Grey (born 1350 Wark-on-Tweed) of Heaton, who married William Clopton of Wickhambrook(d.1377), [Buckenham Castle records]
- Sir Thomas Grey (1359 – 26 November 1400) of Heaton, who married Joan de Mowbray (d.1410), sister of Thomas de Mowbray, 1st Duke of Norfolk, and daughter of John de Mowbray, 4th Baron Mowbray (d. 17 June 1368) and Elizabeth de Segrave.
- Elizabeth Grey (d. 11 August 1412), who married Philip Darcy, 4th Lord Darcy of Knaith (d. 24 April 1399).
- Agnes Grey (d. 25 October 1420), who married Sir Thomas Umfraville (d. 12 February 1391).
