= List of peers 1420–1429 =

This page lists all peers who held extant titles between 1420 and 1429.

== Peerage of England ==
Title	Holder	Date gained	Date lost	Notes
Duke of Cornwall (1337)	none	1413	1421	
Duke of Cornwall (1337)	Henry Plantagenet	1421	1422	
Duke of Cornwall (1337)	none	1422	1453	
Duke of York (1385)	None	1415	1426	Under attainder
Duke of York (1385)	Richard of York, 3rd Duke of York	1426	1460	Peerage restored
Duke of Norfolk (1397)	none	1399	1424	(Deprived of the title)
Duke of Norfolk (1397)	John de Mowbray, 2nd Duke of Norfolk	1424	1432	Restored
Duke of Clarence (1412)	Thomas of Lancaster, 1st Duke of Clarence	1412	1421	Died, title extinct
Duke of Bedford (1414)	John of Lancaster, 1st Duke of Bedford	1414	1435	
Duke of Gloucester (1414)	Humphrey of Lancaster, 1st Duke of Gloucester	1414	1447	
Duke of Exeter (1416)	Thomas Beaufort, Duke of Exeter	1416	1426	Died, title extinct
Earl of Warwick (1088)	Richard de Beauchamp, 13th Earl of Warwick	1401	1439	
Earl of Arundel (1138)	John FitzAlan, 13th Earl of Arundel	1415	1421	Died
Earl of Arundel (1138)	John FitzAlan, 14th Earl of Arundel	1421	1435	
Earl of Oxford (1142)	John de Vere, 12th Earl of Oxford	1417	1462	
Earl of Norfolk (1312)	John de Mowbray, 5th Earl of Norfolk	1405	1432	Restored as Duke, see above
Earl of March (1328)	Edmund Mortimer, 5th Earl of March	1398	1425	Died, succeeded by Richard Plantagenet, who was restored as Duke of York in 1326, see above
Earl of Devon (1335)	Hugh de Courtenay, 4th Earl of Devon	1419	1422	Died
Earl of Devon (1335)	Thomas de Courtenay, 5th Earl of Devon	1422	1458	
Earl of Salisbury (1337)	Thomas Montacute, 4th Earl of Salisbury	1409	1428	Died
Earl of Salisbury (1337)	Alice Montacute, 5th Countess of Salisbury	1428	1462	
Earl of Stafford (1351)	Humphrey Stafford, 6th Earl of Stafford	1403	1460	
Earl of Suffolk (1385)	William de la Pole, 4th Earl of Suffolk	1415	1450	
Earl of Huntingdon (1387)	John Holland, 2nd Earl of Huntingdon	1417	1447	
Earl of Somerset (1397)	John Beaufort, 3rd Earl of Somerset	1418	1444	
Earl of Westmorland (1397)	Ralph Neville, 1st Earl of Westmorland	1397	1425	Died
Earl of Westmorland (1397)	Ralph Neville, 2nd Earl of Westmorland	1425	1484	
Earl of Northumberland (1416)	Henry Percy, 2nd Earl of Northumberland	1416	1455	
Earl of Worcester (1421)	Richard de Beauchamp, 1st Earl of Worcester	1421	1422	New creation; died, title became extinct
Baron de Ros (1264)	John de Ros, 7th Baron de Ros	1414	1421	
Baron de Ros (1264)	Thomas de Ros, 8th Baron de Ros	1421	1431	
Baron Fauconberg (1295)	Joan Neville, 6th Baroness Fauconberg	1429	1490	
Baron FitzWalter (1295)	Walter FitzWalter, 7th Baron FitzWalter	1415	1431	
Baron FitzWarine (1295)	Fulke FitzWarine, 7th Baron FitzWarine	1407	1420	Died
Baron FitzWarine (1295)	Elizabet FitzWarine, suo jure Baroness FitzWarine	1420	1428	Died, Barony fell into abeyance, until 1433
Baron Grey de Wilton (1295)	Richard Grey, 6th Baron Grey de Wilton	1396	1442	
Baron Clinton (1299)	William de Clinton, 4th Baron Clinton	1398	1431	
Baron De La Warr (1299)	Thomas la Warr, 5th Baron De La Warr	1398	1427	Died
Baron De La Warr (1299)	Reginald West, 6th Baron De La Warr	1427	1450	
Baron Ferrers of Chartley (1299)	Edmund de Ferrers, 6th Baron Ferrers of Chartley	1413	1435	
Baron Lovel (1299)	William Lovel, 7th Baron Lovel	1414	1455	
Baron Scales (1299)	Thomas de Scales, 7th Baron Scales	1419	1460	
Baron Welles (1299)	John de Welles, 5th Baron Welles	1361	1421	Died
Baron Welles (1299)	Lionel de Welles, 6th Baron Welles	1421	1461	
Baron de Clifford (1299)	John Clifford, 7th Baron de Clifford	1391-3	1422	Died
Baron de Clifford (1299)	Thomas Clifford, 8th Baron de Clifford	1422	1455	
Baron Ferrers of Groby (1299)	William Ferrers, 5th Baron Ferrers of Groby	1388	1445	
Baron Furnivall (1299)	John Talbot, 6th Baron Furnivall	1407	1453	jure uxoris
Baron Latimer (1299)	John Nevill, 6th Baron Latimer	1395	1430	
Baron Morley (1299)	Thomas de Morley, 5th Baron Morley	1416	1435	
Baron Strange of Knockyn (1299)	Richard le Strange, 7th Baron Strange of Knockyn	1397	1449	
Baron Zouche of Haryngworth (1308)	William la Zouche, 5th Baron Zouche	1415	1463	
Baron Beaumont (1309)	John Beaumont, 6th Baron Beaumont	1416	1460	
Baron Strange of Blackmere (1309)	Ankaret Talbot, 9th Baroness Strange of Blackmere	1419	1421	Died, Barony was succeeded by John Talbot, Baron Furnivall and Talbot (see above), and held by his heirs until 1616, when it fell into abeyance
Baron Audley of Heleigh (1313)	James Tuchet, 5th Baron Audley	1408	1459	
Baron Cobham of Kent (1313)	Joan Oldcastle, 4th Baroness Cobham	1408	1434	
Baron Cherleton (1313)	Edward Cherleton, 5th Baron Cherleton	1401	1421	Died, Barony fell into abeyance
Baron Willoughby de Eresby (1313)	Robert Willoughby, 6th Baron Willoughby de Eresby	1409	1452	
Baron Holand (1314)	Maud de Holland, suo jure Baroness Holand	1373	1420	Died; Barony was succeeded by Baron Lovel, and held by his heirs until 1487, when it was forfeited
Baron Dacre (1321)	Thomas Dacre, 6th Baron Dacre	1398	1458	
Baron FitzHugh (1321)	Henry FitzHugh, 3rd Baron FitzHugh	1386	1425	Died
Baron FitzHugh (1321)	William FitzHugh, 4th Baron FitzHugh	1425	1452	
Baron Greystock (1321)	John de Greystock, 4th Baron Greystock	1417	1436	
Baron Grey of Ruthin (1325)	Reginald Grey, 3rd Baron Grey de Ruthyn	1388	1441	
Baron Harington (1326)	William Harington, 5th Baron Harington	1418	1458	
Baron Burghersh (1330)	Isabel le Despencer, suo jure Baroness Burgersh	1414	1440	
Baron Poynings (1337)	Robert Poynings, 5th Baron Poynings	1387	1446	
Baron Bourchier (1342)	Elizabeth Bourchier, suo jure Baroness Bourchier	1409	1433	
Baron Burnell (1350)	Hugh Burnell, 2nd Baron Burnell	1383	1420	Died, Barony fell into abeyance
Baron Scrope of Masham (1350)	John Scrope, 4th Baron Scrope of Masham	1426	1455	Restored, after the title was under attainder
Baron Saint Maur (1351)	Alice St Maur, suo jure Baroness Saint Maur	1409	1426	Died, title succeeded by more senior Baron Zouche, and held by his heirs until 1626, when both titles fell into abeyance
Baron Lisle (1357)	Elizabeth de Berkeley, 4th Baroness Lisle	1392	1420	Died, Barony fell into abeyance
Baron Botreaux (1368)	William de Botreaux, 3rd Baron Botreaux	1392	1462	
Baron Scrope of Bolton (1371)	Richard Scrope, 3rd Baron Scrope of Bolton	1403	1420	Died
Baron Scrope of Bolton (1371)	Henry Scrope, 4th Baron Scrope of Bolton	1420	1459	
Baron Cromwell (1375)	Ralph de Cromwell, 3rd Baron Cromwell	1417	1455	
Baron Camoys (1383)	Thomas de Camoys, 2nd Baron Camoys	1419	1426	Died; Barony fell into abeyance, until 1839
Baron le Despencer (1387)	Philip le Despencer, 2nd Baron le Despencer	1401	1424	Died, Barony became dormant
Baron Bergavenny (1392)	Richard de Beauchamp, 2nd Baron Bergavenny	1411	1421	Died
Baron Bergavenny (1392)	Elizabeth de Beauchamp, suo jure Baroness Bergavenny	1421	1447	
Baron Grey of Codnor (1397)	John Grey, 2nd Baron Grey of Codnor	1418	1431	
Baron West (1402)	Reginald West, 3rd Baron West	1415	1450	In 1427 succeeded to the more senior Barony de la Warr, both titles held by his heirs until 1554, when they fell into abeyance
Baron Berkeley (1421)	James Berkeley, 1st Baron Berkeley	1421	1463	New creation
Baron Hungerford (1426)	Walter Hungerford, 1st Baron Hungerford	1426	1449	New creation
Baron Tiptoft (1426)	John de Tiptoft, 1st Baron Tiptoft	1426	1443	New creation

== Peerage of Scotland ==
Title	Holder	Date gained	Date lost	Notes
Duke of Rothesay (1398)	-	1406	1430	
Duke of Albany (1398)	Robert Stewart, Duke of Albany	1398	1420	Died
Duke of Albany (1398)	Murdoch Stewart, Duke of Albany	1420	1425	Attainted and his titles were forfeited
Earl of Mar (1114)	Alexander Stewart, Earl of Mar	1408	1435	
Earl of Dunbar (1115)	George I, Earl of March	1368	1420	Died
Earl of Dunbar (1115)	George II, Earl of March	1420	1457	
Earl of Menteith (1160)	Murdoch Stewart, Earl of Menteith	1390	1425	Succeeded as Duke of Albany; attainted, see above
Earl of Lennox (1184)	Donnchadh, Earl of Lennox	1385	1425	Died
Earl of Lennox (1184)	Isabella, Countess of Lennox	1425	1458	
Earl of Ross (1215)	Mariota, Countess of Ross	1415	1429	Died
Earl of Ross (1215)	Alexander of Islay, Earl of Ross	1429	1449	
Earl of Sutherland (1235)	Robert de Moravia, 6th Earl of Sutherland	1370	1427	Died
Earl of Sutherland (1235)	John de Moravia, 7th Earl of Sutherland	1427	1460	
Earl of Douglas (1358)	Archibald Douglas, 4th Earl of Douglas	1400	1424	Died
Earl of Douglas (1358)	Archibald Douglas, 5th Earl of Douglas	1424	1439	
Earl of Strathearn (1371)	Malise Graham, Earl of Strathearn	1410	1427	Deprived of the peerage
Earl of Strathearn (1371)	Walter Stewart, Earl of Atholl	1427	1437	
Earl of Moray (1372)	Thomas Dunbar, 5th Earl of Moray	1391	1422	Died
Earl of Moray (1372)	Thomas Dunbar, 6th Earl of Moray	1422	142?	Died
Earl of Moray (1372)	James Dunbar, 7th Earl of Moray	142?	1429	Died
Earl of Moray (1372)	Elizabeth Dunbar, 8th Countess of Moray	1429	1455	
Earl of Orkney (1379)	William Sinclair, Earl of Orkney	1410	1476	
Earl of Buchan (1382)	John Stewart, Earl of Buchan	1406	1424	Died
Earl of Buchan (1382)	Robert Stewart, Earl of Buchan	1424	1431	
Earl of Angus (1389)	William Douglas, 2nd Earl of Angus	1403	1437	
Earl of Crawford (1398)	Alexander Lindsay, 2nd Earl of Crawford	1407	1439	
Earl of Atholl (1404)	Walter Stewart, Earl of Atholl	1404	1437	
Earl of Menteith (1427)	Malise Graham, 1st Earl of Menteith	1427	1490	New creation
Lord Erskine (1427)	Robert Erskine, 1st Lord Erskine	1429	1453	New creation
Lord Hay (1427)	William Hay, 1st Lord Hay	1429	1462	New creation

== Peerage of Ireland ==
Title	Holder	Date gained	Date lost	Notes
Earl of Ulster (1264)	Edmund Mortimer, 7th Earl of Ulster	1398	1425	Died
Earl of Ulster (1264)	Richard of York, 8th Earl of Ulster	1425	1460	
Earl of Kildare (1316)	Gerald FitzGerald, 5th Earl of Kildare	1390	1432	
Earl of Ormond (1328)	James Butler, 4th Earl of Ormond	1405	1452	
Earl of Desmond (1329)	Thomas FitzGerald, 5th Earl of Desmond	1399	1420	Died
Earl of Desmond (1329)	James FitzGerald, 6th Earl of Desmond	1420	1463	
Baron Athenry (1172)	Walter de Bermingham	1374	1428	Died
Baron Athenry (1172)	Thomas II de Bermingham	1428	1473	
Baron Kingsale (1223)	Nicholas de Courcy, 10th Baron Kingsale	1410	1430	
Baron Kerry (1223)	Thomas Fitzmaurice, 8th Baron Kerry	1410	1469	
Baron Barry (1261)	John Barry, 7th Baron Barry	1392	1420	Died
Baron Barry (1261)	William Barry, 8th Baron Barry	1420	1480	
Baron Gormanston (1370)	Christopher Preston, 2nd Baron Gormanston	1396	1422	Died
Baron Gormanston (1370)	Christopher Preston, 3rd Baron Gormanston	1422	1450	
Baron Slane (1370)	Thomas Fleming, 2nd Baron Slane	1370	1435	
Baron Howth (1425)	Christopher St Lawrence, 1st Baron Howth	1425	1430	New creation

Preceded by List of peers 1410–1419	Lists of peers by decade 1420–1429	Succeeded by List of peers 1430–1439
