= List of peers 1430–1439 =

This page lists all peers who held extant titles between 1430 and 1439.

== Peerage of England ==
Title	Holder	Date gained	Date lost	Notes
Duke of Cornwall (1337)	none	1422	1453	
Duke of York (1385)	Richard of York, 3rd Duke of York	1426	1460	
Duke of Norfolk (1397)	John de Mowbray, 2nd Duke of Norfolk	1424	1432	Died
Duke of Norfolk (1397)	John de Mowbray, 3rd Duke of Norfolk	1432	1461	
Duke of Bedford (1414)	John of Lancaster, 1st Duke of Bedford	1414	1435	Died, title extinct
Duke of Gloucester (1414)	Humphrey of Lancaster, 1st Duke of Gloucester	1414	1447	
Earl of Warwick (1088)	Richard de Beauchamp, 13th Earl of Warwick	1401	1439	Died
Earl of Warwick (1088)	Henry de Beauchamp, 14th Earl of Warwick	1439	1446	
Earl of Arundel (1138)	John FitzAlan, 14th Earl of Arundel	1421	1435	Died
Earl of Arundel (1138)	Humphrey FitzAlan, 15th Earl of Arundel	1435	1438	Died
Earl of Arundel (1138)	William FitzAlan, 16th Earl of Arundel	1438	1487	
Earl of Oxford (1142)	John de Vere, 12th Earl of Oxford	1417	1462	
Earl of Devon (1335)	Thomas de Courtenay, 5th Earl of Devon	1422	1458	
Earl of Salisbury (1337)	Alice Montacute, 5th Countess of Salisbury	1428	1462	
Earl of Stafford (1351)	Humphrey Stafford, 6th Earl of Stafford	1403	1460	
Earl of Suffolk (1385)	William de la Pole, 4th Earl of Suffolk	1415	1450	
Earl of Huntingdon (1387)	John Holland, 2nd Earl of Huntingdon	1417	1447	
Earl of Somerset (1397)	John Beaufort, 3rd Earl of Somerset	1418	1444	
Earl of Westmorland (1397)	Ralph Neville, 2nd Earl of Westmorland	1425	1484	
Earl of Northumberland (1416)	Henry Percy, 2nd Earl of Northumberland	1416	1455	
Baron de Ros (1264)	Thomas de Ros, 8th Baron de Ros	1421	1431	Died
Baron de Ros (1264)	Thomas de Ros, 9th Baron de Ros	1421	1464	
Baron Fauconberg (1295)	Joan Neville, 6th Baroness Fauconberg	1429	1490	
Baron FitzWalter (1295)	Walter FitzWalter, 7th Baron FitzWalter	1415	1431	Died
Baron FitzWalter (1295)	Elizabeth Radcliffe, suo jure Baroness FitzWalter	1431	1485	
Baron FitzWarine (1295)	Thomazine FitzWarine, suo jure Baroness FitzWarine	1433	1471	
Baron Grey de Wilton (1295)	Richard Grey, 6th Baron Grey de Wilton	1396	1442	
Baron Clinton (1299)	William de Clinton, 4th Baron Clinton	1398	1431	Died
Baron Clinton (1299)	John de Clinton, 5th Baron Clinton	1431	1464	
Baron De La Warr (1299)	Reginald West, 6th Baron De La Warr	1427	1450	
Baron Ferrers of Chartley (1299)	Edmund de Ferrers, 6th Baron Ferrers of Chartley	1413	1435	Died
Baron Ferrers of Chartley (1299)	William de Ferrers, 7th Baron Ferrers of Chartley	1435	1450	
Baron Lovel (1299)	William Lovel, 7th Baron Lovel	1414	1455	
Baron Scales (1299)	Thomas de Scales, 7th Baron Scales	1419	1460	
Baron Welles (1299)	Lionel de Welles, 6th Baron Welles	1421	1461	
Baron de Clifford (1299)	Thomas Clifford, 8th Baron de Clifford	1422	1455	
Baron Ferrers of Groby (1299)	William Ferrers, 5th Baron Ferrers of Groby	1388	1445	
Baron Furnivall (1299)	John Talbot, 6th Baron Furnivall	1407	1453	jure uxoris
Baron Latimer (1299)	John Nevill, 6th Baron Latimer	1395	1430	Died, his heirs never assumed the title
Baron Morley (1299)	Thomas de Morley, 5th Baron Morley	1416	1435	Died
Baron Morley (1299)	Robert de Morley, 6th Baron Morley	1435	1442	
Baron Strange of Knockyn (1299)	Richard le Strange, 7th Baron Strange of Knockyn	1397	1449	
Baron Zouche of Haryngworth (1308)	William la Zouche, 5th Baron Zouche	1415	1463	
Baron Beaumont (1309)	John Beaumont, 6th Baron Beaumont	1416	1460	
Baron Audley of Heleigh (1313)	James Tuchet, 5th Baron Audley	1408	1459	
Baron Cobham of Kent (1313)	Joan Oldcastle, 4th Baroness Cobham	1408	1434	Died
Baron Cobham of Kent (1313)	Joan Brooke, 5th Baroness Cobham	1434	1442	
Baron Willoughby de Eresby (1313)	Robert Willoughby, 6th Baron Willoughby de Eresby	1409	1452	
Baron Dacre (1321)	Thomas Dacre, 6th Baron Dacre	1398	1458	
Baron FitzHugh (1321)	William FitzHugh, 4th Baron FitzHugh	1425	1452	
Baron Greystock (1321)	John de Greystock, 4th Baron Greystock	1417	1436	Died
Baron Greystock (1321)	Ralph de Greystock, 5th Baron Greystock	1436	1487	
Baron Grey of Ruthin (1325)	Reginald Grey, 3rd Baron Grey de Ruthyn	1388	1441	
Baron Harington (1326)	William Harington, 5th Baron Harington	1418	1458	
Baron Burghersh (1330)	Isabel le Despencer, suo jure Baroness Burgersh	1414	1440	
Baron Poynings (1337)	Robert Poynings, 5th Baron Poynings	1387	1446	
Baron Bourchier (1342)	Elizabeth Bourchier, suo jure Baroness Bourchier	1409	1433	Died
Baron Bourchier (1342)	Henry Bourchier, 5th Baron Bourchier	1433	1483	
Baron Scrope of Masham (1350)	John Scrope, 4th Baron Scrope of Masham	1426	1455	
Baron Botreaux (1368)	William de Botreaux, 3rd Baron Botreaux	1392	1462	
Baron Scrope of Bolton (1371)	Henry Scrope, 4th Baron Scrope of Bolton	1420	1459	
Baron Cromwell (1375)	Ralph de Cromwell, 3rd Baron Cromwell	1417	1455	
Baron Bergavenny (1392)	Elizabeth de Beauchamp, suo jure Baroness Bergavenny	1421	1447	
Baron Grey of Codnor (1397)	John Grey, 2nd Baron Grey of Codnor	1418	1431	Died
Baron Grey of Codnor (1397)	Henry Grey, 3rd Baron Grey of Codnor	1431	1444	
Baron Berkeley (1421)	James Berkeley, 1st Baron Berkeley	1421	1463	
Baron Hungerford (1426)	Walter Hungerford, 1st Baron Hungerford	1426	1449	
Baron Tiptoft (1426)	John de Tiptoft, 1st Baron Tiptoft	1426	1443	
Baron Latimer (1432)	George Neville, 1st Baron Latimer	1432	1469	New creation
Baron Fanhope (1433)	John Cornwall, 1st Baron Fanhope	1433	1443	New creation

== Peerage of Scotland ==
Title	Holder	Date gained	Date lost	Notes
Duke of Rothesay (1398)	Alexander Stewart, Duke of Rothesay	1430	1430	Died
Duke of Rothesay (1398)	James Stewart, Duke of Rothesay	1430	1437	Acceded to the Throne of Scotland
Earl of Mar (1114)	Alexander Stewart, Earl of Mar	1408	1435	Died; for de jure Earl of Mar 1438–1565 see Lords Erskine below
Earl of Dunbar (1115)	George II, Earl of March	1420	1457	
Earl of Lennox (1184)	Isabella, Countess of Lennox	1425	1458	
Earl of Ross (1215)	Alexander of Islay, Earl of Ross	1429	1449	
Earl of Sutherland (1235)	John de Moravia, 7th Earl of Sutherland	1427	1460	
Earl of Douglas (1358)	Archibald Douglas, 5th Earl of Douglas	1424	1439	Died
Earl of Douglas (1358)	William Douglas, 6th Earl of Douglas	1439	1440	
Earl of Strathearn (1371)	Walter Stewart, Earl of Atholl	1427	1437	Executed for treason, and his titles were forfeited
Earl of Moray (1372)	Elizabeth Dunbar, 8th Countess of Moray	1429	1455	
Earl of Orkney (1379)	William Sinclair, Earl of Orkney	1410	1476	
Earl of Buchan (1382)	Robert Stewart, Earl of Buchan	1424	1431	Died, title extinct
Earl of Angus (1389)	William Douglas, 2nd Earl of Angus	1403	1437	Died
Earl of Angus (1389)	James Douglas, 3rd Earl of Angus	1437	1446	
Earl of Crawford (1398)	Alexander Lindsay, 2nd Earl of Crawford	1407	1439	Died
Earl of Crawford (1398)	David Lindsay, 3rd Earl of Crawford	1439	1446	
Earl of Atholl (1404)	Walter Stewart, Earl of Atholl	1404	1437	Executed for treason, and his titles were forfeited
Earl of Menteith (1427)	Malise Graham, 1st Earl of Menteith	1427	1490	
Earl of Avondale (1437)	James Douglas, 1st Earl of Avondale	1437	1443	New creation
Lord Erskine (1429)	Robert Erskine, 1st Lord Erskine	1429	1453	de jure 12th Earl of Mar
Lord Hay (1429)	William Hay, 1st Lord Hay	1429	1462	
Lord Somerville (1430)	Thomas Somerville, 1st Lord Somerville	1430	1438	New creation
Lord Somerville (1430)	William Somerville, 2nd Lord Somerville	1438	1456	
Lord Lorne (1439)	Robert Stewart, 1st Lord of Lorne	1439	1449	

== Peerage of Ireland ==
Title	Holder	Date gained	Date lost	Notes
Earl of Ulster (1264)	Richard of York, 8th Earl of Ulster	1425	1460	
Earl of Kildare (1316)	Gerald FitzGerald, 5th Earl of Kildare	1390	1432	Died
Earl of Kildare (1316)	John FitzGerald, 6th Earl of Kildare	1432	1434	Died
Earl of Kildare (1316)	Thomas FitzGerald, 7th Earl of Kildare	1434	1478	
Earl of Ormond (1328)	James Butler, 4th Earl of Ormond	1405	1452	
Earl of Desmond (1329)	James FitzGerald, 6th Earl of Desmond	1420	1463	
Baron Athenry (1172)	Thomas II de Bermingham	1428	1473	
Baron Kingsale (1223)	Nicholas de Courcy, 10th Baron Kingsale	1410	1430	Died
Baron Kingsale (1223)	Patrick de Courcy, 11th Baron Kingsale	1430	1460	
Baron Kerry (1223)	Thomas Fitzmaurice, 8th Baron Kerry	1410	1469	
Baron Barry (1261)	William Barry, 8th Baron Barry	1420	1480	
Baron Gormanston (1370)	Christopher Preston, 3rd Baron Gormanston	1422	1450	
Baron Slane (1370)	Thomas Fleming, 2nd Baron Slane	1370	1435	Died
Baron Slane (1370)	Christopher Fleming, 3rd Baron Slane	1435	1446	
Baron Howth (1425)	Christopher St Lawrence, 1st Baron Howth	1425	1430	Died
Baron Howth (1425)	Christopher St Lawrence, 2nd Baron Howth	1430	1465	

Preceded by List of peers 1420–1429	Lists of peers by decade 1430–1439	Succeeded by List of peers 1440–1449
