= List of peers 1440–1449 =

This page lists all peers who held extant titles between 1440 and 1449.

== Peerage of England ==
Title	Holder	Date gained	Date lost	Notes
Duke of Cornwall (1337)	none	1422	1453	
Duke of York (1385)	Richard of York, 3rd Duke of York	1426	1460	
Duke of Norfolk (1397)	John de Mowbray, 3rd Duke of Norfolk	1432	1461	
Duke of Gloucester (1414)	Humphrey of Lancaster, 1st Duke of Gloucester	1414	1447	Died, title extinct
Duke of Exeter (1443)	John Holland, 2nd Duke of Exeter	1443	1447	
Duke of Exeter (1443)	Henry Holland, 3rd Duke of Exeter	1447	1461	
Duke of Somerset (1443)	John Beaufort, 1st Duke of Somerset	1443	1444	New creation, also Earl of Kendal; Died, title extinct
Duke of Buckingham (1444)	Humphrey Stafford, 1st Duke of Buckingham	1444	1460	New creation
Duke of Warwick (1445)	Henry de Beauchamp, 1st Duke of Warwick	1445	1446	New creation for the 14th Earl of Warwick; Died, title extinct
Duke of Somerset (1448)	Edmund Beaufort, 1st Duke of Somerset	1448	1455	New creation; also Marquess of Dorset (1442) and Earl of Dorset (1441)
Duke of Suffolk (1448)	William de la Pole, 1st Duke of Suffolk	1448	1450	New creation; also Marquess of Suffolk (1444)
Earl of Warwick (1088)	Henry de Beauchamp, 14th Earl of Warwick	1401	1439	See Duke of Warwick above
Earl of Warwick (1088)	Anne de Beauchamp, 15th Countess of Warwick	1446	1448	Died
Earl of Warwick (1088)	Anne Neville, 16th Countess of Warwick and Richard Neville, 16th Earl of Warwick	1448; 1449	1492; 1471	
Earl of Arundel (1138)	William FitzAlan, 16th Earl of Arundel	1438	1487	
Earl of Oxford (1142)	John de Vere, 12th Earl of Oxford	1417	1462	
Earl of Devon (1335)	Thomas de Courtenay, 5th Earl of Devon	1422	1458	
Earl of Salisbury (1337)	Alice Montacute, 5th Countess of Salisbury and Richard Neville, 5th Earl of Salisbury	1428; 1442	1462; 1460	
Earl of Stafford (1351)	Humphrey Stafford, 6th Earl of Stafford	1403	1460	Created Duke of Buckingham, see above
Earl of Suffolk (1385)	William de la Pole, 4th Earl of Suffolk	1415	1450	See above, Duke of Suffolk
Earl of Huntingdon (1387)	John Holland, 2nd Earl of Huntingdon	1417	1447	Restored as Duke of Exeter, see above
Earl of Somerset (1397)	John Beaufort, 3rd Earl of Somerset	1418	1444	Duke of Somerset in 1443, see above
Earl of Somerset (1397)	Edmund Beaufort, 4th Earl of Somerset	1444	1455	Duke of Somerset in 1448, see above
Earl of Westmorland (1397)	Ralph Neville, 2nd Earl of Westmorland	1425	1484	
Earl of Northumberland (1416)	Henry Percy, 2nd Earl of Northumberland	1416	1455	
Earl of Shrewsbury (1442)	John Talbot, 1st Earl of Shrewsbury	1442	1453	New creation
Earl of Kendal (1446)	John de Foix, 1st Earl of Kendal	1446	1462	New creation
Earl of Wiltshire (1449)	James Butler, 1st Earl of Wiltshire	1449	1461	New creation
Earl of Worcester (1449)	John Tiptoft, 1st Earl of Worcester	1449	1470	New creation
Viscount Beaumont (1440)	John Beaumont, 1st Viscount Beaumont	1440	1460	New creation
Viscount Bourchier (1446)	Henry Bourchier, 1st Viscount Bourchier	1446	1483	New creation
Baron de Ros (1264)	Thomas de Ros, 10th Baron de Ros	1421	1464	
Baron Fauconberg (1295)	Joan Neville, 6th Baroness Fauconberg	1429	1490	
Baron FitzWalter (1295)	Elizabeth Radcliffe, suo jure Baroness FitzWalter	1431	1485	
Baron FitzWarine (1295)	Thomazine FitzWarine, suo jure Baroness FitzWarine	1433	1471	
Baron Grey de Wilton (1295)	Richard Grey, 6th Baron Grey de Wilton	1396	1442	Died
Baron Grey de Wilton (1295)	Reginald Grey, 7th Baron Grey de Wilton	1442	1493	
Baron Clinton (1299)	John de Clinton, 5th Baron Clinton	1431	1464	
Baron De La Warr (1299)	Reginald West, 6th Baron De La Warr	1427	1450	
Baron Ferrers of Chartley (1299)	William de Ferrers, 7th Baron Ferrers of Chartley	1435	1450	
Baron Lovel (1299)	William Lovel, 7th Baron Lovel	1414	1455	
Baron Scales (1299)	Thomas de Scales, 7th Baron Scales	1419	1460	
Baron Welles (1299)	Lionel de Welles, 6th Baron Welles	1421	1461	
Baron de Clifford (1299)	Thomas Clifford, 8th Baron de Clifford	1422	1455	
Baron Ferrers of Groby (1299)	William Ferrers, 5th Baron Ferrers of Groby	1388	1445	Died
Baron Ferrers of Groby (1299)	Elizabeth Ferrers, 6th Baroness Ferrers of Groby	1445	1483	
Baron Furnivall (1299)	John Talbot, 6th Baron Furnivall	1407	1453	jure uxoris; created Earl of Shrewsbury in 1442; barony held by his heirs until 1616 when it fell into abeyance
Baron Morley (1299)	Robert de Morley, 6th Baron Morley	1435	1442	Died
Baron Morley (1299)	Alianore Lovel, 7th Baroness Morley	1442	1476	
Baron Strange of Knockyn (1299)	Richard le Strange, 7th Baron Strange of Knockyn	1397	1449	Died
Baron Strange of Knockyn (1299)	John le Strange, 8th Baron Strange	1449	1470	
Baron Zouche of Haryngworth (1308)	William la Zouche, 5th Baron Zouche	1415	1463	
Baron Beaumont (1309)	John Beaumont, 6th Baron Beaumont	1416	1460	Created Viscount Beaumont, Barony held by his heirs until 1507, when it fell into abeyance
Baron Audley of Heleigh (1313)	James Tuchet, 5th Baron Audley	1408	1459	
Baron Cobham of Kent (1313)	Joan Brooke, 5th Baroness Cobham	1434	1442	Died
Baron Cobham of Kent (1313)	Edward Brooke, 6th Baron Cobham	1442	1464	
Baron Willoughby de Eresby (1313)	Robert Willoughby, 6th Baron Willoughby de Eresby	1409	1452	
Baron Dacre (1321)	Thomas Dacre, 6th Baron Dacre	1398	1458	
Baron FitzHugh (1321)	William FitzHugh, 4th Baron FitzHugh	1425	1452	
Baron Greystock (1321)	Ralph de Greystock, 5th Baron Greystock	1436	1487	
Baron Grey of Ruthyn (1325)	Reginald Grey, 3rd Baron Grey de Ruthyn	1388	1441	Died
Baron Grey of Ruthyn (1325)	Edmund Grey, 4th Baron Grey de Ruthyn	1441	1490	
Baron Harington (1326)	William Harington, 5th Baron Harington	1418	1458	
Baron Burghersh (1330)	Isabel le Despencer, suo jure Baroness Burgersh	1414	1440	Died; Barony succeeded by the Earl of Warwick, and held by his heirs until 1459 when it fell into abeyance
Baron Poynings (1337)	Robert Poynings, 5th Baron Poynings	1387	1446	Died
Baron Poynings (1337)	Eleanor Percy, 6th Baroness Poynings	1446	1482	
Baron Bourchier (1342)	Henry Bourchier, 5th Baron Bourchier	1433	1483	Created Viscount Bourchier, see above
Baron Scrope of Masham (1350)	John Scrope, 4th Baron Scrope of Masham	1426	1455	
Baron Botreaux (1368)	William de Botreaux, 3rd Baron Botreaux	1392	1462	
Baron Scrope of Bolton (1371)	Henry Scrope, 4th Baron Scrope of Bolton	1420	1459	
Baron Cromwell (1375)	Ralph de Cromwell, 3rd Baron Cromwell	1417	1455	
Baron Bergavenny (1392)	Elizabeth de Beauchamp, suo jure Baroness Bergavenny	1421	1447	Died
Baron Bergavenny (1392)	George Nevill, 4th Baron Bergavenny	1447	1492	
Baron Grey of Codnor (1397)	Henry Grey, 3rd Baron Grey of Codnor	1431	1444	Died
Baron Grey of Codnor (1397)	Henry Grey, 4th Baron Grey of Codnor	1444	1496	
Baron Berkeley (1421)	James Berkeley, 1st Baron Berkeley	1421	1463	
Baron Hungerford (1426)	Walter Hungerford, 1st Baron Hungerford	1426	1449	Died
Baron Hungerford (1426)	Robert Hungerford, 2nd Baron Hungerford	1449	1459	
Baron Tiptoft (1426)	John de Tiptoft, 1st Baron Tiptoft	1426	1443	Died
Baron Tiptoft (1426)	John de Tiptoft, 2nd Baron Tiptoft	1443	1470	Created Earl of Worcester in 1449, and held by his heirs until 1485, when Barony fell into abeyance
Baron Latimer (1432)	George Neville, 1st Baron Latimer	1432	1469	
Baron Fanhope (1433)	John Cornwall, 1st Baron Fanhope	1433	1443	Created Baron Milbroke in 1442; died, all titles extinct
Baron Dudley (1440)	John Sutton, 1st Baron Dudley	1440	1487	New creation
Baron Sudeley (1441)	Ralph Boteler, 1st Baron Sudeley	1441	1473	New creation
Baron Lisle (1444)	John Talbot, 1st Baron Lisle	1444	1453	New creation
Baron de Moleyns (1445)	Robert Hungerford, 1st Baron de Moleyns	1445	1461	New creation
Baron Saye and Sele (1447)	James Fiennes, 1st Baron Saye and Sele	1447	1450	New creation
Baron Beauchamp of Powick (1447)	John Beauchamp, 1st Baron Beauchamp of Powick	1447	1475	New creation
Baron Hoo and Hastings (1447)	Thomas Hoo, Baron Hoo and Hastings	1447	1455	New creation
Baron Rivers (1448)	Richard Woodville, 1st Baron Rivers	1448	1469	New creation
Baron Stourton (1448)	John Stourton, 1st Baron Stourton	1448	1462	New creation
Baron Vessy (1449)	Henry Bromflete, 1st Baron Vessy	1449	1469	New creation
Baron Bonville (1449)	William Bonville, 1st Baron Bonville	1449	1461	New creation
Baron Egremont (1449)	Thomas Percy, 1st Baron Egremont	1449	1460	New creation

== Peerage of Scotland ==
Title	Holder	Date gained	Date lost	Notes
Duke of Rothesay (1398)	-	1437	1452	
Earl of Dunbar (1115)	George II, Earl of March	1420	1457	
Earl of Lennox (1184)	Isabella, Countess of Lennox	1425	1458	
Earl of Ross (1215)	Alexander of Islay, Earl of Ross	1429	1449	Died
Earl of Ross (1215)	John of Islay, Earl of Ross	1449	1476	
Earl of Sutherland (1235)	John de Moravia, 7th Earl of Sutherland	1427	1460	
Earl of Douglas (1358)	William Douglas, 6th Earl of Douglas	1439	1440	Died
Earl of Douglas (1358)	James Douglas, 7th Earl of Douglas	1440	1443	
Earl of Douglas (1358)	William Douglas, 8th Earl of Douglas	1443	1452	
Earl of Moray (1372)	Elizabeth Dunbar, 8th Countess of Moray	1429	1455	
Earl of Orkney (1379)	William Sinclair, Earl of Orkney	1410	1476	Lord Sinclair in 1449
Earl of Angus (1389)	James Douglas, 3rd Earl of Angus	1437	1446	Died
Earl of Angus (1389)	George Douglas, 4th Earl of Angus	1446	1463	
Earl of Crawford (1398)	David Lindsay, 3rd Earl of Crawford	1439	1446	Died
Earl of Crawford (1398)	Alexander Lindsay, 4th Earl of Crawford	1446	1453	
Earl of Menteith (1427)	Malise Graham, 1st Earl of Menteith	1427	1490	
Earl of Avondale (1437)	James Douglas, 1st Earl of Avondale	1437	1443	Succeeded to the more senior Earldom of Douglas, see above
Earl of Huntly (1445)	Alexander Gordon, 1st Earl of Huntly	1445	1470	New creation
Earl of Ormond (1445)	Hugh Douglas, Earl of Ormonde	1445	1455	New creation
Lord Erskine (1429)	Robert Erskine, 1st Lord Erskine	1429	1453	de jure 12th Earl of Mar
Lord Hay (1429)	William Hay, 1st Lord Hay	1429	1462	
Lord Somerville (1430)	William Somerville, 2nd Lord Somerville	1438	1456	
Lord Lorne (1439)	Robert Stewart, 1st Lord of Lorne	1439	1449	Died
Lord Lorne (1439)	John Stewart, 2nd Lord of Lorne	1449	1463	
Lord Haliburton of Dirleton (1441)	Walter de Haliburton, 1st Lord Haliburton of Dirleton	1441	1447	New creation; died
Lord Haliburton of Dirleton (1441)	John Haliburton, 2nd Lord Haliburton of Dirleton	1447	1454	
Lord Forbes (1442)	Alexander Forbes, 1st Lord Forbes	1442	1448	New creation; died
Lord Forbes (1442)	James Forbes, 2nd Lord Forbes	1448	1462	
Lord Crichton (1443)	William Crichton, 1st Lord Crichton	1443	1454	New creation
Lord Hamilton (1445)	James Hamilton, 1st Lord Hamilton	1445	1479	New creation
Lord Maxwell (1445)	Herbert Maxwell, 1st Lord Maxwell	1445	1454	New creation
Lord Glamis (1445)	Patrick Lyon, 1st Lord Glamis	1445	1459	New creation
Lord Graham (1445)	Patrick Graham, 1st Lord Graham	1445	1466	New creation
Lord Leslie and Ballinbreich (1445)	George Leslie, 1st Lord Leslie and Ballinbreich	1445	1490	New creation
Lord Lindsay of the Byres (1445)	Lawrence Abernethy, 1st Lord Saltoun	1445	1460	New creation
Lord Saltoun (1445)	Lawrence Abernethy, 1st Lord Saltoun	1445	1460	New creation
Lord Campbell (1445)	Duncan Campbell, 1st Lord Campbell	1445	1453	New creation
Lord Gray (1445)	Andrew Gray, 1st Lord Gray	1445	1469	New creation
Lord Montgomerie (1449)	Alexander Montgomerie, 1st Lord Montgomerie	1449	1470	New creation

== Peerage of Ireland ==
Title	Holder	Date gained	Date lost	Notes
Earl of Ulster (1264)	Richard of York, 8th Earl of Ulster	1425	1460	
Earl of Kildare (1316)	Thomas FitzGerald, 7th Earl of Kildare	1434	1478	
Earl of Ormond (1328)	James Butler, 4th Earl of Ormond	1405	1452	
Earl of Desmond (1329)	James FitzGerald, 6th Earl of Desmond	1420	1463	
Earl of Waterford (1446)	John Talbot, 1st Earl of Waterford	1446	1453	New creation
Baron Athenry (1172)	Thomas II de Bermingham	1428	1473	
Baron Kingsale (1223)	Patrick de Courcy, 11th Baron Kingsale	1430	1460	
Baron Kerry (1223)	Thomas Fitzmaurice, 8th Baron Kerry	1410	1469	
Baron Barry (1261)	William Barry, 8th Baron Barry	1420	1480	
Baron Gormanston (1370)	Christopher Preston, 3rd Baron Gormanston	1422	1450	
Baron Slane (1370)	Christopher Fleming, 3rd Baron Slane	1435	1446	Died
Baron Slane (1370)	Christopher Fleming, 4th Baron Slane	1446	1457	
Baron Howth (1425)	Christopher St Lawrence, 2nd Baron Howth	1430	1465	
Baron Killeen (1449)	Christopher Plunkett, 1st Baron Killeen	1449	1455	New creation

Preceded by List of peers 1430–1439	Lists of peers by decade 1440–1449	Succeeded by List of peers 1450–1459
