= List of peers 1450–1459 =

This page lists all peers who held extant titles between 1450 and 1459.

== Peerage of England ==
| Title | Holder | Date gained | Date lost | Notes |
|---|---|---|---|---|
| Duke of Cornwall (1337) | none | 1422 | 1453 | |
| Duke of Cornwall (1337) | Edward of Westminster | 1453 | 1471 | |
| Duke of York (1385) | Richard of York, 3rd Duke of York | 1426 | 1460 | |
| Duke of Norfolk (1397) | John de Mowbray, 3rd Duke of Norfolk | 1432 | 1461 | |
| Duke of Exeter (1443) | Henry Holland, 3rd Duke of Exeter | 1447 | 1461 | |
| Duke of Buckingham (1444) | Humphrey Stafford, 1st Duke of Buckingham | 1444 | 1460 | |
| Duke of Somerset (1448) | Edmund Beaufort, 1st Duke of Somerset | 1448 | 1455 | Died |
| Duke of Somerset (1448) | Henry Beaufort, 2nd Duke of Somerset | 1455 | 1464 | |
| Duke of Suffolk (1448) | William de la Pole, 1st Duke of Suffolk | 1448 | 1450 | Died; titles considered forfeited |
| Duke of Suffolk (1448) | John de la Pole, 2nd Duke of Suffolk | 1450 | 1463 | Title recognized in 1463 |
| Earl of Warwick (1088) | Anne Neville, 16th Countess of Warwick and Richard Neville, 16th Earl of Warwick | 1448; 1449 | 1492; 1471 | |
| Earl of Arundel (1138) | William FitzAlan, 16th Earl of Arundel | 1438 | 1487 | |
| Earl of Oxford (1142) | John de Vere, 12th Earl of Oxford | 1417 | 1462 | |
| Earl of Devon (1335) | Thomas de Courtenay, 5th Earl of Devon | 1422 | 1458 | Died |
| Earl of Devon (1335) | Thomas Courtenay, 6th Earl of Devon | 1458 | 1461 | |
| Earl of Salisbury (1337) | Alice Montacute, 5th Countess of Salisbury and Richard Neville, 5th Earl of Salisbury | 1428; 1442 | 1462; 1460 | |
| Earl of Westmorland (1397) | Ralph Neville, 2nd Earl of Westmorland | 1425 | 1484 | |
| Earl of Northumberland (1416) | Henry Percy, 2nd Earl of Northumberland | 1416 | 1455 | |
| Earl of Northumberland (1416) | Henry Percy, 3rd Earl of Northumberland | 1455 | 1461 | |
| Earl of Shrewsbury (1442) | John Talbot, 1st Earl of Shrewsbury | 1442 | 1453 | Died |
| Earl of Shrewsbury (1442) | John Talbot, 2nd Earl of Shrewsbury | 1453 | 1460 | |
| Earl of Kendal (1446) | John de Foix, 1st Earl of Kendal | 1446 | 1462 | |
| Earl of Wiltshire (1449) | James Butler, 1st Earl of Wiltshire | 1449 | 1461 | |
| Earl of Worcester (1449) | John Tiptoft, 1st Earl of Worcester | 1449 | 1470 | |
| Earl of Surrey (1451) | John de Mowbray, 1st Earl of Surrey | 1451 | 1476 | New creation |
| Earl of Richmond (1452) | Edmund Tudor, 1st Earl of Richmond | 1452 | 1456 | New creation; died |
| Earl of Richmond (1452) | Henry Tudor, Earl of Richmond | 1456 | 1485 | |
| Earl of Pembroke (1452) | Jasper Tudor, 1st Earl of Pembroke | 1452 | 1461 | New creation |
| Viscount Beaumont (1440) | John Beaumont, 1st Viscount Beaumont | 1440 | 1460 | |
| Viscount Bourchier (1446) | Henry Bourchier, 1st Viscount Bourchier | 1446 | 1483 | |
| Viscount Lisle (1451) | John Talbot, 1st Viscount Lisle | 1451 | 1453 | New creation; died |
| Viscount Lisle (1451) | Thomas Talbot, 2nd Viscount Lisle | 1453 | 1470 | |
| Baron de Ros (1264) | Thomas de Ros, 9th Baron de Ros | 1421 | 1464 | |
| Baron Fauconberg (1295) | Joan Neville, 6th Baroness Fauconberg | 1429 | 1490 | |
| Baron FitzWalter (1295) | Elizabeth Radcliffe, suo jure Baroness FitzWalter | 1431 | 1485 | |
| Baron FitzWarine (1295) | Thomazine FitzWarine, suo jure Baroness FitzWarine | 1433 | 1471 | |
| Baron Grey de Wilton (1295) | Reginald Grey, 7th Baron Grey de Wilton | 1442 | 1493 | |
| Baron Clinton (1299) | John de Clinton, 5th Baron Clinton | 1431 | 1464 | |
| Baron De La Warr (1299) | Reginald West, 6th Baron De La Warr | 1427 | 1450 | Died |
| Baron De La Warr (1299) | Richard West, 7th Baron De La Warr | 1450 | 1476 | |
| Baron Ferrers of Chartley (1299) | William de Ferrers, 7th Baron Ferrers of Chartley | 1435 | 1450 | Died |
| Baron Ferrers of Chartley (1299) | Anne Ferrers, 8th Baroness Ferrers of Chartley | 1450 | 1468 | |
| Baron Lovel (1299) | William Lovel, 7th Baron Lovel | 1414 | 1455 | Died |
| Baron Lovel (1299) | John Lovel, 8th Baron Lovel | 1455 | 1465 | |
| Baron Scales (1299) | Thomas de Scales, 7th Baron Scales | 1419 | 1460 | |
| Baron Welles (1299) | Lionel de Welles, 6th Baron Welles | 1421 | 1461 | |
| Baron de Clifford (1299) | Thomas Clifford, 8th Baron de Clifford | 1422 | 1455 | Died |
| Baron de Clifford (1299) | John Clifford, 9th Baron de Clifford | 1455 | 1461 | |
| Baron Ferrers of Groby (1299) | Elizabeth Ferrers, 6th Baroness Ferrers of Groby | 1445 | 1483 | |
| Baron Morley (1299) | Alianore Lovel, 7th Baroness Morley | 1442 | 1476 | |
| Baron Strange of Knockyn (1299) | John le Strange, 8th Baron Strange | 1449 | 1470 | |
| Baron Zouche of Haryngworth (1308) | William la Zouche, 5th Baron Zouche | 1415 | 1463 | |
| Baron Audley of Heleigh (1313) | James Tuchet, 5th Baron Audley | 1408 | 1459 | Died |
| Baron Audley of Heleigh (1313) | John Tuchet, 6th Baron Audley | 1459 | 1490 | |
| Baron Cobham of Kent (1313) | Edward Brooke, 6th Baron Cobham | 1442 | 1464 | |
| Baron Willoughby de Eresby (1313) | Robert Willoughby, 6th Baron Willoughby de Eresby | 1409 | 1452 | Died |
| Baron Willoughby de Eresby (1313) | Joan Willoughby, 7th Baroness Willoughby de Eresby | 1452 | 1462 | |
| Baron Dacre (1321) | Thomas Dacre, 6th Baron Dacre | 1398 | 1458 | Died |
| Baron Dacre (1321) | Joan Dacre, 7th Baroness Dacre | 1458 | 1486 | |
| Baron FitzHugh (1321) | William FitzHugh, 4th Baron FitzHugh | 1425 | 1452 | Died |
| Baron FitzHugh (1321) | Henry FitzHugh, 5th Baron FitzHugh | 1452 | 1472 | |
| Baron Greystock (1321) | Ralph de Greystock, 5th Baron Greystock | 1436 | 1487 | |
| Baron Grey of Ruthyn (1325) | Edmund Grey, 4th Baron Grey de Ruthyn | 1441 | 1490 | |
| Baron Harington (1326) | William Harington, 5th Baron Harington | 1418 | 1458 | Died |
| Baron Harington (1326) | William Bonville, 6th Baron Harington | 1458 | 1460 | |
| Baron Poynings (1337) | Eleanor Percy, 6th Baroness Poynings | 1446 | 1482 | |
| Baron Scrope of Masham (1350) | John Scrope, 4th Baron Scrope of Masham | 1426 | 1455 | Died |
| Baron Scrope of Masham (1350) | Thomas Scrope, 5th Baron Scrope of Masham | 1455 | 1475 | |
| Baron Botreaux (1368) | William de Botreaux, 3rd Baron Botreaux | 1392 | 1462 | |
| Baron Scrope of Bolton (1371) | Henry Scrope, 4th Baron Scrope of Bolton | 1420 | 1459 | Died |
| Baron Scrope of Bolton (1371) | John Scrope, 5th Baron Scrope of Bolton | 1459 | 1498 | |
| Baron Cromwell (1375) | Ralph de Cromwell, 3rd Baron Cromwell | 1417 | 1455 | Died, Barony fell into abeyance until 1490 |
| Baron Bergavenny (1392) | George Nevill, 4th Baron Bergavenny | 1447 | 1492 | |
| Baron Grey of Codnor (1397) | Henry Grey, 4th Baron Grey of Codnor | 1444 | 1496 | |
| Baron Berkeley (1421) | James Berkeley, 1st Baron Berkeley | 1421 | 1463 | |
| Baron Hungerford (1426) | Robert Hungerford, 2nd Baron Hungerford | 1449 | 1459 | Died |
| Baron Hungerford (1426) | Robert Hungerford, 3rd Baron Hungerford | 1459 | 1461 | |
| Baron Latimer (1432) | George Neville, 1st Baron Latimer | 1432 | 1469 | |
| Baron Dudley (1440) | John Sutton, 1st Baron Dudley | 1440 | 1487 | |
| Baron Sudeley (1441) | Ralph Boteler, 1st Baron Sudeley | 1441 | 1473 | |
| Baron Lisle (1444) | John Talbot, 1st Baron Lisle | 1444 | 1453 | Created Viscount Lisle in 1451, title held by his heir until 1475 |
| Baron de Moleyns (1445) | Robert Hungerford, 1st Baron de Moleyns | 1445 | 1461 | Succeeded to the more senior Barony of Hungerford in 1459, see above |
| Baron Saye and Sele (1447) | James Fiennes, 1st Baron Saye and Sele | 1447 | 1450 | Died |
| Baron Saye and Sele (1447) | William Fiennes, 2nd Baron Saye and Sele | 1450 | 1471 | |
| Baron Beauchamp of Powick (1447) | John Beauchamp, 1st Baron Beauchamp of Powick | 1447 | 1475 | |
| Baron Hoo and Hastings (1447) | Thomas Hoo, Baron Hoo and Hastings | 1447 | 1455 | Died, title extinct |
| Baron Rivers (1448) | Richard Woodville, 1st Baron Rivers | 1448 | 1469 | |
| Baron Stourton (1448) | John Stourton, 1st Baron Stourton | 1448 | 1462 | |
| Baron Vessy (1449) | Henry Bromflete, 1st Baron Vessy | 1449 | 1469 | |
| Baron Bonville (1449) | William Bonville, 1st Baron Bonville | 1449 | 1461 | |
| Baron Egremont (1449) | Thomas Percy, 1st Baron Egremont | 1449 | 1460 | |
| Baron Bergavenny (1450) | Edward Nevill, 1st Baron Bergavenny | 1450 | 1476 | New creation |
| Baron Richemount (1450) | Thomas Grey, 1st Baron Richemount | 1450 | 1461 | New creation |
| Baron Berners (1455) | John Bourchier, 1st Baron Berners | 1455 | 1474 | New creation |
| Baron Stanley (1456) | Thomas Stanley, 1st Baron Stanley | 1456 | 1459 | New creation, died |
| Baron Stanley (1456) | Thomas Stanley, 2nd Baron Stanley | 1459 | 1504 | |
| Baron Dacre of Gilsland (1459) | Randolph Dacre, 1st Baron Dacre | 1459 | 1461 | New creation |
| Baron Neville (1459) | John Neville, Baron Neville | 1459 | 1461 | New creation |

== Peerage of Scotland ==
| Title | Holder | Date gained | Date lost | Notes |
|---|---|---|---|---|
| Duke of Rothesay (1398) | James Stewart, Duke of Rothesay | 1452 | 1460 | |
| Duke of Albany (1456) | Alexander Stewart, Duke of Albany | 1456 | 1483 | New creation |
| Earl of Dunbar (1115) | George II, Earl of March | 1420 | 1457 | |
| Earl of Lennox (1184) | Isabella, Countess of Lennox | 1425 | 1458 | Died, title extinct |
| Earl of Ross (1215) | John of Islay, Earl of Ross | 1449 | 1476 | |
| Earl of Sutherland (1235) | John de Moravia, 7th Earl of Sutherland | 1427 | 1460 | |
| Earl of Douglas (1358) | William Douglas, 8th Earl of Douglas | 1443 | 1452 | Died |
| Earl of Douglas (1358) | James Douglas, 9th Earl of Douglas | 1452 | 1455 | Attainted and his honours were forfeited |
| Earl of Moray (1372) | Elizabeth Dunbar, 8th Countess of Moray | 1429 | 1455 | Attainted, and the Earldom was forfeited |
| Earl of Orkney (1379) | William Sinclair, Earl of Orkney | 1410 | 1476 | |
| Earl of Angus (1389) | George Douglas, 4th Earl of Angus | 1446 | 1463 | |
| Earl of Crawford (1398) | Alexander Lindsay, 4th Earl of Crawford | 1446 | 1453 | |
| Earl of Crawford (1398) | David Lindsay, 5th Earl of Crawford | 1453 | 1495 | |
| Earl of Menteith (1427) | Malise Graham, 1st Earl of Menteith | 1427 | 1490 | |
| Earl of Huntly (1445) | Alexander Gordon, 1st Earl of Huntly | 1445 | 1470 | |
| Earl of Ormond (1445) | Hugh Douglas, Earl of Ormonde | 1445 | 1455 | Forfeited |
| Earl of Caithness (1452) | George Crichton, 1st Earl of Caithness | 1452 | 1454 | New creation; resigned the peerage |
| Earl of Erroll (1452) | William Hay, 1st Earl of Erroll | 1452 | 1462 | New creation |
| Earl of Caithness (1455) | William Sinclair, 1st Earl of Caithness | 1455 | 1476 | New creation |
| Earl of Argyll (1457) | Colin Campbell, 1st Earl of Argyll | 1457 | 1493 | New creation |
| Earl of Atholl (1457) | John Stewart, 1st Earl of Atholl | 1457 | 1512 | New creation |
| Earl of Morton (1458) | James Douglas, 1st Earl of Morton | 1458 | 1493 | New creation |
| Earl of Rothes (1458) | George Leslie, 1st Earl of Rothes | 1458 | 1490 | New creation |
| Earl Marischal (1458) | William Keith, 1st Earl Marischal | 1458 | 1463 | New creation |
| Earl of Mar and Garioch (1459) | John Stewart, Earl of Mar and Garioch | 1459 | 1479 | New creation |
| Lord Erskine (1429) | Robert Erskine, 1st Lord Erskine | 1429 | 1453 | de jure Earl of Mar; died |
| Lord Erskine (1429) | Thomas Erskine, 2nd Lord Erskine | 1453 | 1494 | de jure Earl of Mar |
| Lord Hay (1429) | William Hay, 1st Lord Hay | 1429 | 1462 | Created Earl of Errol, see above |
| Lord Somerville (1430) | William Somerville, 2nd Lord Somerville | 1438 | 1456 | Died |
| Lord Somerville (1430) | John Somerville, 3rd Lord Somerville | 1456 | 1491 | |
| Lord Lorne (1439) | John Stewart, 2nd Lord of Lorne | 1449 | 1463 | |
| Lord Haliburton of Dirleton (1441) | John Haliburton, 2nd Lord Haliburton of Dirleton | 1447 | 1454 | Died |
| Lord Haliburton of Dirleton (1441) | Patrick Haliburton, 3rd Lord Haliburton of Dirleton | 1454 | 1459 | Died |
| Lord Haliburton of Dirleton (1441) | George Haliburton, 4th Lord Haliburton of Dirleton | 1459 | 1492 | |
| Lord Forbes (1442) | James Forbes, 2nd Lord Forbes | 1448 | 1462 | |
| Lord Crichton (1443) | William Crichton, 1st Lord Crichton | 1443 | 1454 | Died |
| Lord Crichton (1443) | James Crichton, 2nd Lord Crichton | 1454 | 1455 | Died |
| Lord Crichton (1443) | William Crichton, 3rd Lord Crichton | 1454 | 1484 | |
| Lord Hamilton (1445) | James Hamilton, 1st Lord Hamilton | 1445 | 1479 | |
| Lord Maxwell (1445) | Herbert Maxwell, 1st Lord Maxwell | 1445 | 1454 | Died |
| Lord Maxwell (1445) | Robert Maxwell, 2nd Lord Maxwell | 1454 | 1485 | |
| Lord Glamis (1445) | Patrick Lyon, 1st Lord Glamis | 1445 | 1459 | Died |
| Lord Glamis (1445) | Alexander Lyon, 2nd Lord Glamis | 1459 | 1486 | |
| Lord Graham (1445) | Patrick Graham, 1st Lord Graham | 1445 | 1466 | |
| Lord Leslie and Ballinbreich (1445) | George Leslie, 1st Lord Leslie and Ballinbreich | 1445 | 1490 | Created Earl of Rothes, see above |
| Lord Lindsay of the Byres (1445) | John Lindsay, 1st Lord Lindsay | 1445 | 1482 | |
| Lord Saltoun (1445) | Lawrence Abernethy, 1st Lord Saltoun | 1445 | 1460 | |
| Lord Campbell (1445) | Duncan Campbell, 1st Lord Campbell | 1445 | 1453 | Died |
| Lord Campbell (1445) | Colin Campbell, 2nd Lord Campbell | 1453 | 1493 | Created Earl of Argyll in 1457, see above |
| Lord Gray (1445) | Andrew Gray, 1st Lord Gray | 1445 | 1469 | |
| Lord Montgomerie (1449) | Alexander Montgomerie, 1st Lord Montgomerie | 1449 | 1470 | |
| Lord Fleming (1451) | Robert Fleming, 1st Lord Fleming | 1451 | 1494 | New creation |
| Lord Seton (1451) | George Seton, 1st Lord Seton | 1451 | 1478 | New creation |
| Lord Borthwick (1452) | William Borthwick, 1st Lord Borthwick | 1452 | 1470 | New creation |
| Lord Boyd (1454) | Robert Boyd, 1st Lord Boyd | 1454 | 1482 | New creation |
| Lord Oliphant (1455) | Laurence Oliphant, 1st Lord Oliphant | 1455 | 1498 | New creation |
| Lord Kennedy (1457) | Gilbert Kennedy, 1st Lord Kennedy | 1457 | 1489 | New creation |
| Lord Livingston (1458) | James Livingston, 1st Lord Livingston | 1458 | 1467 | New creation |
| Lord Hailes (1458) | Patrick Hepburn, 1st Lord Hailes | 1458 | 1483 | New creation |
| Lord Avandale (1459) | Andrew Stewart, 1st Lord Avandale | 1459 | 1488 | New creation |

== Peerage of Ireland ==
| Title | Holder | Date gained | Date lost | Notes |
|---|---|---|---|---|
| Earl of Ulster (1264) | Richard of York, 8th Earl of Ulster | 1425 | 1460 | |
| Earl of Kildare (1316) | Thomas FitzGerald, 7th Earl of Kildare | 1434 | 1478 | |
| Earl of Ormond (1328) | James Butler, 4th Earl of Ormond | 1405 | 1452 | Died |
| Earl of Ormond (1328) | James Butler, 5th Earl of Ormond | 1452 | 1461 | |
| Earl of Desmond (1329) | James FitzGerald, 6th Earl of Desmond | 1420 | 1463 | |
| Earl of Waterford (1446) | John Talbot, 1st Earl of Waterford | 1446 | 1453 | Died |
| Earl of Waterford (1446) | John Talbot, 2nd Earl of Waterford | 1453 | 1460 | |
| Baron Athenry (1172) | Thomas II de Bermingham | 1428 | 1473 | |
| Baron Kingsale (1223) | Patrick de Courcy, 11th Baron Kingsale | 1430 | 1460 | |
| Baron Kerry (1223) | Thomas Fitzmaurice, 8th Baron Kerry | 1410 | 1469 | |
| Baron Barry (1261) | William Barry, 8th Baron Barry | 1420 | 1480 | |
| Baron Gormanston (1370) | Christopher Preston, 3rd Baron Gormanston | 1422 | 1450 | Died |
| Baron Gormanston (1370) | Robert Preston, 4th Baron Gormanston | 1450 | 1503 | |
| Baron Slane (1370) | Christopher Fleming, 4th Baron Slane | 1446 | 1457 | Died |
| Baron Slane (1370) | David Fleming, 5th Baron Slane | 1457 | 1463 | |
| Baron Howth (1425) | Christopher St Lawrence, 2nd Baron Howth | 1430 | 1465 | |
| Baron Killeen (1449) | Christopher Plunkett, 1st Baron Killeen | 1449 | 1455 | Died |
| Baron Killeen (1449) | Christopher Plunkett, 2nd Baron Killeen | 1455 | 1462 | |

| Preceded by List of peers 1440–1449 | Lists of peers by decade 1450–1459 | Succeeded by List of peers 1460–1469 |
