= List of peers 1410–1419 =

This page lists all peers who held extant titles between 1410 and 1419.

== Peerage of England ==
Title	Holder	Date gained	Date lost	Notes
Duke of Cornwall (1337)	Henry of Monmouth	1399	1413	1st Duke of Lancaster; Ascended the throne, when all his honours merged in the Crown
Duke of Cornwall (1337)	None	1413	1421	
Duke of York (1385)	Edward of Norwich, 2nd Duke of York	1402	1415	Resigned the Earldom of Cambridge; died
Duke of York (1385)	None	1415	1426	Peerage attainted
Duke of Norfolk (1397)	none	1399	1424	(Deprived of the title)
Duke of Clarence (1412)	Thomas of Lancaster, 1st Duke of Clarence	1412	1421	New creation, also Earl of Albemarle
Duke of Bedford (1414)	John of Lancaster, 1st Duke of Bedford	1414	1435	New creation, also Earl of Kendal and Richmond
Duke of Gloucester (1414)	Humphrey of Lancaster, 1st Duke of Gloucester	1414	1447	New creation, also Earl of Pembroke
Duke of Exeter (1416)	Thomas Beaufort, Duke of Exeter	1416	1426	New creation, also Earl of Dorset (1411)
Earl of Surrey (1088)	Thomas FitzAlan, 10th Earl of Surrey	1400	1415	12th Earl of Arundel; died, the Earldom of Surrey became extinct
Earl of Warwick (1088)	Richard de Beauchamp, 13th Earl of Warwick	1401	1439	
Earl of Arundel (1138)	John FitzAlan, 13th Earl of Arundel	1415	1421	
Earl of Oxford (1142)	Richard de Vere, 11th Earl of Oxford	1400	1417	Died
Earl of Oxford (1142)	John de Vere, 12th Earl of Oxford	1417	1462	
Earl of Norfolk (1312)	John de Mowbray, 5th Earl of Norfolk	1405	1432	
Earl of March (1328)	Edmund Mortimer, 5th Earl of March	1398	1425	
Earl of Devon (1335)	Edward de Courtenay, 3rd Earl of Devon	1377	1419	Died
Earl of Devon (1335)	Hugh de Courtenay, 4th Earl of Devon	1419	1422	
Earl of Salisbury (1337)	Thomas Montacute, 4th Earl of Salisbury	1409	1428	
Earl of Stafford (1351)	Humphrey Stafford, 6th Earl of Stafford	1403	1460	
Earl of Suffolk (1385)	Michael de la Pole, 2nd Earl of Suffolk	1399	1415	Died
Earl of Suffolk (1385)	Michael de la Pole, 3rd Earl of Suffolk	1415	1415	Died
Earl of Suffolk (1385)	William de la Pole, 4th Earl of Suffolk	1415	1450	
Earl of Huntingdon (1387)	John Holland, 2nd Earl of Huntingdon	1417	1447	Restored to his father's Earldom
Earl of Somerset (1397)	John Beaufort, 1st Earl of Somerset	1397	1410	Died
Earl of Somerset (1397)	Henry Beaufort, 2nd Earl of Somerset	1410	1418	Died
Earl of Somerset (1397)	John Beaufort, 3rd Earl of Somerset	1418	1444	
Earl of Westmorland (1397)	Ralph Neville, 1st Earl of Westmorland	1397	1425	
Earl of Cambridge (1414)	Richard, 1st Earl of Cambridge	1414	1415	Attainted, and his honours became forfeited
Earl of Northumberland (1416)	Henry Percy, 2nd Earl of Northumberland	1416	1455	Either a new creation, or restoration of 1377 creation
Baron de Ros (1264)	William de Ros, 6th Baron de Ros	1393	1414	Died
Baron de Ros (1264)	John de Ros, 7th Baron de Ros	1414	1421	
Baron Berkeley (1295)	Thomas de Berkeley, 5th Baron Berkeley	1368	1417	Died, title extinct
Baron Fauconberg (1295)	in abeyance	1407	1429	
Baron FitzWalter (1295)	Humphrey FitzWalter, 6th Baron FitzWalter	1406	1415	Died
Baron FitzWalter (1295)	Walter FitzWalter, 7th Baron FitzWalter	1415	1431	
Baron FitzWarine (1295)	Fulke FitzWarine, 7th Baron FitzWarine	1407	1420	
Baron Grey de Wilton (1295)	Richard Grey, 6th Baron Grey de Wilton	1396	1442	
Baron Mauley (1295)	Peter de Mauley, 4th Baron Mauley	1383	1415	Died, Barony fell into abeyance
Baron Clinton (1299)	William de Clinton, 4th Baron Clinton	1398	1431	
Baron De La Warr (1299)	Thomas la Warr, 5th Baron De La Warr	1398	1427	
Baron Ferrers of Chartley (1299)	Robert de Ferrers, 5th Baron Ferrers of Chartley	1367	1413	Died
Baron Ferrers of Chartley (1299)	Edmund de Ferrers, 6th Baron Ferrers of Chartley	1413	1435	
Baron Lovel (1299)	John Lovel, 6th Baron Lovel	1408	1414	Died
Baron Lovel (1299)	William Lovel, 7th Baron Lovel	1414	1455	
Baron Scales (1299)	Robert de Scales, 6th Baron Scales	1402	1419	Died
Baron Scales (1299)	Thomas de Scales, 7th Baron Scales	1419	1460	
Baron Welles (1299)	John de Welles, 5th Baron Welles	1361	1421	
Baron de Clifford (1299)	John Clifford, 7th Baron de Clifford	1391-3	1422	
Baron Ferrers of Groby (1299)	William Ferrers, 5th Baron Ferrers of Groby	1388	1445	
Baron Furnivall (1299)	John Talbot, 6th Baron Furnivall	1407	1453	jure uxoris
Baron Latimer (1299)	EJohn Nevill, 6th Baron Latimer	1395	1430	
Baron Morley (1299)	Thomas de Morley, 4th Baron Morley	1379	1416	Died
Baron Morley (1299)	Thomas de Morley, 5th Baron Morley	1416	1435	
Baron Strange of Knockyn (1299)	Richard le Strange, 7th Baron Strange of Knockyn	1397	1449	
Baron Boteler of Wemme (1308)	Elizabeth Le Boteler, de jure Baroness Boteler of Wemme	1361	1411	Died, Barony fell into abeyance
Baron Zouche of Haryngworth (1308)	William la Zouche, 4th Baron Zouche	1396	1415	Died
Baron Zouche of Haryngworth (1308)	William la Zouche, 5th Baron Zouche	1415	1463	
Baron Beaumont (1309)	Henry Beaumont, 5th Baron Beaumont	1396	1413	Died
Baron Beaumont (1309)	John Beaumont, 6th Baron Beaumont	1416	1460	
Baron Strange of Blackmere (1309)	Ankaret Lestrangee, suo jure Baroness Strange of Blackmere	1383	1413	Died
Baron Strange of Blackmere (1309)	Gilbert Talbot, 8th Baron Strange of Blackmere	1413	1419	Died
Baron Strange of Blackmere (1309)	Ankaret Talbot, 9th Baroness Strange of Blackmere	1419	1421	
Baron Audley of Heleigh (1313)	James Tuchet, 5th Baron Audley	1408	1459	
Baron Cobham of Kent (1313)	Joan Oldcastle, 4th Baroness Cobham	1408	1434	
Baron Cherleton (1313)	Edward Cherleton, 5th Baron Cherleton	1401	1421	
Baron Willoughby de Eresby (1313)	Robert Willoughby, 6th Baron Willoughby de Eresby	1409	1452	
Baron Holand (1314)	Maud de Holland, suo jure Baroness Holand	1373	1420	
Baron Dacre (1321)	Thomas Dacre, 6th Baron Dacre	1398	1458	
Baron FitzHugh (1321)	Henry FitzHugh, 3rd Baron FitzHugh	1386	1425	
Baron Greystock (1321)	Ralph de Greystock, 3rd Baron Greystock	1358	1417	Died
Baron Greystock (1321)	John de Greystock, 4th Baron Greystock	1417	1436	
Baron Grey of Ruthin (1325)	Reginald Grey, 3rd Baron Grey de Ruthyn	1388	1441	
Baron Harington (1326)	John Harington, 4th Baron Harington	1406	1418	
Baron Harington (1326)	William Harington, 5th Baron Harington	1418	1458	
Baron Burghersh (1330)	Richard le Despenser, 4th Baron Burghersh	1409	1414	Died
Baron Burghersh (1330)	Isabel le Despencer, suo jure Baroness Burgersh	1414	1440	
Baron Maltravers (1330)	John Fitzalan, 3rd Baron Maltraveres	1405	1421	Summoned as Earl of Arundel, see above
Baron Darcy de Knayth (1332)	John Darcy, 5th Baron Darcy de Knayth	1398	1411	Died
Baron Darcy de Knayth (1332)	Philip Darcy, 6th Baron Darcy de Knayth	1411	1418	Died, Barony fell into abeyance until 1641
Baron Talbot (1332)	Gilbert Talbot, 5th Baron Talbot	1396	1419	Succeeded as more senior Baron Strange, see above
Baron Poynings (1337)	Robert Poynings, 5th Baron Poynings	1387	1446	
Baron Bourchier (1342)	Elizabeth Bourchier, suo jure Baroness Bourchier	1409	1433	
Baron Burnell (1350)	Hugh Burnell, 2nd Baron Burnell	1383	1420	
Baron Scrope of Masham (1350)	Henry Scrope, 3rd Baron Scrope of Masham	1406	1415	Attainted, and his honours were forfeited
Baron Saint Maur (1351)	Alice St Maur, suo jure Baroness Saint Maur	1409	1426	
Baron Lisle (1357)	Elizabeth de Berkeley, 4th Baroness Lisle	1392	1420	
Baron Botreaux (1368)	William de Botreaux, 3rd Baron Botreaux	1392	1462	
Baron Scrope of Bolton (1371)	Richard Scrope, 3rd Baron Scrope of Bolton	1403	1420	
Baron Cromwell (1375)	Ralph de Cromwell, 2nd Baron Cromwell	1398	1417	Died
Baron Cromwell (1375)	Ralph de Cromwell, 3rd Baron Cromwell	1417	1455	
Baron Camoys (1383)	Thomas de Camoys, 1st Baron Camoys	1383	1419	Died
Baron Camoys (1383)	Thomas de Camoys, 2nd Baron Camoys	1419	1426	
Baron le Despencer (1387)	Philip le Despencer, 2nd Baron le Despencer	1401	1424	
Baron Bergavenny (1392)	William de Beauchamp, 1st Baron Bergavenny	1392	1411	Died
Baron Bergavenny (1392)	Richard de Beauchamp, 2nd Baron Bergavenny	1411	1421	
Baron Grey of Codnor (1397)	Richard Grey, 1st Baron Grey of Codnor	1397	1418	Died
Baron Grey of Codnor (1397)	John Grey, 2nd Baron Grey of Codnor	1418	1431	
Baron West (1402)	Thomas West, 2nd Baron West	1405	1415	Died
Baron West (1402)	Reginald West, 3rd Baron West	1415	1450	
Baron Oldcastell (1397)	John Oldcastell, 1st Baron Oldcastell	1409	1417	Died, title forfeited

== Peerage of Scotland ==
Title	Holder	Date gained	Date lost	Notes
Duke of Rothesay (1398)	-	1406	1430	
Duke of Albany (1398)	Robert Stewart, Duke of Albany	1398	1420	
Earl of Mar (1114)	Alexander Stewart, Earl of Mar	1408	1435	
Earl of Dunbar (1115)	George I, Earl of March	1368	1420	
Earl of Menteith (1160)	Murdoch Stewart, Earl of Menteith	1390	1425	
Earl of Lennox (1184)	Donnchadh, Earl of Lennox	1385	1425	
Earl of Ross (1215)	Euphemia II, Countess of Ross	1402	1415	Resigned
Earl of Ross (1215)	Mariota, Countess of Ross	1415	1429	
Earl of Sutherland (1235)	Robert de Moravia, 6th Earl of Sutherland	1370	1427	
Earl of Douglas (1358)	Archibald Douglas, 4th Earl of Douglas	1400	1424	
Earl of Strathearn (1371)	Euphemia Stewart, Countess of Strathearn	1386	1410	Died
Earl of Strathearn (1371)	Malise Graham, Earl of Strathearn	1410	1427	
Earl of Moray (1372)	Thomas Dunbar, 5th Earl of Moray	1391	1422	
Earl of Orkney (1379)	Henry II Sinclair, Earl of Orkney	1379	1418	
Earl of Orkney (1379)	William Sinclair, Earl of Orkney	1379	1476	
Earl of Buchan (1382)	John Stewart, Earl of Buchan	1406	1424	
Earl of Angus (1389)	William Douglas, 2nd Earl of Angus	1403	1437	
Earl of Crawford (1398)	Alexander Lindsay, 2nd Earl of Crawford	1407	1439	
Earl of Atholl (1404)	Walter Stewart, Earl of Atholl	1404	1437	

== Peerage of Ireland ==
Title	Holder	Date gained	Date lost	Notes
Earl of Ulster (1264)	Edmund Mortimer, 7th Earl of Ulster	1398	1425	
Earl of Kildare (1316)	Gerald FitzGerald, 5th Earl of Kildare	1390	1432	
Earl of Ormond (1328)	James Butler, 4th Earl of Ormond	1405	1452	
Earl of Desmond (1329)	Thomas FitzGerald, 5th Earl of Desmond	1399	1420	
Earl of Cork (1396)	Edward of Norwich, 1st Earl of Cork	1396	1415	Died, title extinct
Baron Athenry (1172)	Walter de Bermingham	1374	1428	
Baron Kingsale (1223)	William de Courcy, 9th Baron Kingsale	1387	1410	Died
Baron Kingsale (1223)	Nicholas de Courcy, 10th Baron Kingsale	1410	1430	
Baron Kerry (1223)	Patrick Fitzmaurice, 7th Baron Kerry	1398	1410	Died
Baron Kerry (1223)	Thomas Fitzmaurice, 8th Baron Kerry	1410	1469	
Baron Barry (1261)	John Barry, 7th Baron Barry	1392	1420	
Baron Gormanston (1370)	Christopher Preston, 2nd Baron Gormanston	1396	1422	
Baron Slane (1370)	Thomas Fleming, 2nd Baron Slane	1370	1435	

Preceded by List of peers 1400–1409	Lists of peers by decade 1410–1419	Succeeded by List of peers 1420–1429
