= List of peers 1460–1469 =

This page lists all peers who held extant titles between 1460 and 1469.

== Peerage of England ==
Title	Holder	Date gained	Date lost	Notes
Duke of Cornwall (1337)	Edward of Westminster	1453	1471	
Duke of York (1385)	Richard of York, 3rd Duke of York	1426	1460	
Duke of York (1385)	Edward Plantagenet, 4th Duke of York	1460	1461	Proclaimed King, and all his honours merged in the Crown
Duke of Norfolk (1397)	John de Mowbray, 3rd Duke of Norfolk	1432	1461	Died
Duke of Norfolk (1397)	John de Mowbray, 4th Duke of Norfolk	1461	1476	
Duke of Exeter (1443)	Henry Holland, 3rd Duke of Exeter	1447	1461	Attainted, and his honours became forfeited
Duke of Buckingham (1444)	Humphrey Stafford, 1st Duke of Buckingham	1444	1460	
Duke of Buckingham (1444)	Henry Stafford, 2nd Duke of Buckingham	1460	1483	
Duke of Somerset (1448)	Henry Beaufort, 2nd Duke of Somerset	1455	1464	Attainted in 1461; restored in 1463; Died
Duke of Somerset (1448)	Edmund Beaufort, 3rd Duke of Somerset	1464	1471	
Duke of Suffolk (1448)	John de la Pole, 2nd Duke of Suffolk	1450	1491	Title recognized in 1463
Duke of Clarence (1461)	George Plantagenet, 1st Duke of Clarence	1461	1478	New creation
Duke of Gloucester (1461)	Richard Plantagenet, 1st Duke of Gloucester	1461	1483	New creation
Earl of Warwick (1088)	Anne Neville, 16th Countess of Warwick and Richard Neville, 16th Earl of Warwick	1448; 1449	1492; 1471	
Earl of Arundel (1138)	William FitzAlan, 16th Earl of Arundel	1438	1487	
Earl of Oxford (1142)	John de Vere, 12th Earl of Oxford	1417	1462	Died
Earl of Oxford (1142)	John de Vere, 13th Earl of Oxford	1462	1474	
Earl of Devon (1335)	Thomas Courtenay, 6th Earl of Devon	1458	1461	Attainted, and his honours became forfeited
Earl of Devon (1335)	none	1461	1470	Attainted
Earl of Salisbury (1337)	Alice Montacute, 5th Countess of Salisbury and Richard Neville, 5th Earl of Salisbury	1428; 1442	1462; 1460	Died
Earl of Salisbury (1337)	Richard Neville, 6th Earl of Salisbury	1462	1471	
Earl of Westmorland (1397)	Ralph Neville, 2nd Earl of Westmorland	1425	1484	
Earl of Northumberland (1416)	Henry Percy, 3rd Earl of Northumberland	1455	1461	Attainted, and his honours became forfeited
Earl of Northumberland (1416)	none	1461	1470	Attainted
Earl of Shrewsbury (1442)	John Talbot, 2nd Earl of Shrewsbury	1453	1460	Died
Earl of Shrewsbury (1442)	John Talbot, 3rd Earl of Shrewsbury	1460	1473	
Earl of Kendal (1446)	John de Foix, 1st Earl of Kendal	1446	1462	Surrendered the peerage
Earl of Wiltshire (1449)	James Butler, 1st Earl of Wiltshire	1449	1461	Died, title extinct
Earl of Worcester (1449)	John Tiptoft, 1st Earl of Worcester	1449	1470	
Earl of Surrey (1451)	John de Mowbray, 1st Earl of Surrey	1451	1476	Succeeded as the 4th Duke of Norfolk in 1461, see above
Earl of Richmond (1452)	Henry Tudor, Earl of Richmond	1456	1485	(Attainted in 1461)
Earl of Pembroke (1452)	Jasper Tudor, 1st Earl of Pembroke	1452	1461	Attainted
Earl of Essex (1461)	Henry Bourchier, 1st Earl of Essex	1461	1483	New creation
Earl of Kent (1461)	William Neville, 1st Earl of Kent	1461	1463	New creation; died, title extinct
Earl of Kent (1465)	Edmund Grey, 1st Earl of Kent	1465	1490	New creation
Earl Rivers (1465)	Richard Woodville, 1st Earl Rivers	1466	1469	New creation; died
Earl Rivers (1465)	Anthony Woodville, 2nd Earl Rivers	1469	1483	
Earl of Lincoln (1467)	John de la Pole, 1st Earl of Lincoln	1467	1487	New creation
Earl of Northumberland (1465)	John Neville, 1st Earl of Northumberland	1465	1469	New creation; cancelled in chancery
Earl of Pembroke (1469)	William Herbert, 1st Earl of Pembroke	1469	1469	New creation; created Baron Herbert in 1461; died
Earl of Pembroke (1469)	William Herbert, 2nd Earl of Pembroke	1469	1479	
Earl of Devon (1469)	Humphrey Stafford, 1st Earl of Devon	1469	1469	New creation; forfeited
Viscount Beaumont (1440)	John Beaumont, 1st Viscount Beaumont	1440	1460	Died
Viscount Beaumont (1440)	William Beaumont, 2nd Viscount Beaumont	1460	1507	Attainted 1461-1470
Viscount Bourchier (1446)	Henry Bourchier, 1st Viscount Bourchier	1446	1483	Created Earl of Essex, see above
Viscount Lisle (1451)	Thomas Talbot, 2nd Viscount Lisle	1453	1470	
Baron de Ros (1264)	Thomas de Ros, 9th Baron de Ros	1421	1464	Attainted in 1461; Died
Baron de Ros (1264)	Edmund de Ros, 10th Baron de Ros	1464	1508	Under attainder until 1485
Baron Dynham (1295)	John Dynham, 8th or 1st Baron Dynham	1467	1501	
Baron Fauconberg (1295)	Joan Neville, 6th Baroness Fauconberg	1429	1490	
Baron FitzWalter (1295)	Elizabeth Radcliffe, suo jure Baroness FitzWalter	1431	1485	
Baron FitzWarine (1295)	Thomazine FitzWarine, suo jure Baroness FitzWarine	1433	1471	
Baron Grey de Wilton (1295)	Reginald Grey, 7th Baron Grey de Wilton	1442	1493	
Baron Clinton (1299)	John de Clinton, 5th Baron Clinton	1431	1464	Died
Baron Clinton (1299)	John Clinton, 6th Baron Clinton	1464	1488	
Baron De La Warr (1299)	Richard West, 7th Baron De La Warr	1450	1476	
Baron Ferrers of Chartley (1299)	Anne Ferrers, 8th Baroness Ferrers of Chartley	1450	1468	Died
Baron Ferrers of Chartley (1299)	John Devereux, 9th Baron Ferrers of Chartley	1468	1501	
Baron Lovel (1299)	John Lovel, 8th Baron Lovel	1455	1465	Died
Baron Lovel (1299)	Francis Lovel, 9th Baron Lovel	1465	1485	
Baron Scales (1299)	Thomas de Scales, 7th Baron Scales	1419	1460	Died
Baron Scales (1299)	Elizabeth de Scales Woodville, Baroness Scales	1460	1473	
Baron Welles (1299)	Lionel de Welles, 6th Baron Welles	1421	1461	Died, attainted and his honours were forfeited
Baron Welles (1299)	Richard de Welles, 7th Baron Welles	1468	1469	Died, attainted and his honours were forfeited
Baron de Clifford (1299)	John Clifford, 9th Baron de Clifford	1455	1461	Died, attainted and his honours were forfeited
Baron Ferrers of Groby (1299)	Elizabeth Ferrers, 6th Baroness Ferrers of Groby	1445	1483	
Baron Morley (1299)	Alianore Lovel, 7th Baroness Morley	1442	1476	
Baron Strange of Knockyn (1299)	John le Strange, 8th Baron Strange	1449	1470	
Baron Zouche of Haryngworth (1308)	William la Zouche, 5th Baron Zouche	1415	1463	Died
Baron Zouche of Haryngworth (1308)	William la Zouche, 6th Baron Zouche	1463	1468	Died
Baron Zouche of Haryngworth (1308)	John la Zouche, 7th Baron Zouche	1468	1526	
Baron Audley of Heleigh (1313)	John Tuchet, 6th Baron Audley	1459	1490	
Baron Cobham of Kent (1313)	Edward Brooke, 6th Baron Cobham	1442	1464	Died
Baron Cobham of Kent (1313)	John Brooke, 7th Baron Cobham	1464	1512	
Baron Willoughby de Eresby (1313)	Joan Willoughby, 7th Baroness Willoughby de Eresby	1452	1462	Died
Baron Willoughby de Eresby (1313)	Robert Welles, 8th Baron Willoughby de Eresby	1462	1470	
Baron Dacre (1321)	Joan Dacre, 7th Baroness Dacre	1458	1486	
Baron FitzHugh (1321)	Henry FitzHugh, 5th Baron FitzHugh	1452	1472	
Baron Greystock (1321)	Ralph de Greystock, 5th Baron Greystock	1436	1487	
Baron Grey of Ruthyn (1325)	Edmund Grey, 4th Baron Grey de Ruthyn	1441	1490	Created Earl of Kent, see above
Baron Harington (1326)	William Bonville, 6th Baron Harington	1458	1460	Died
Baron Harington (1326)	Cecily Bonville, 7th Baroness Harington	1460	1530	
Baron Poynings (1337)	Eleanor Percy, 6th Baroness Poynings	1446	1482	
Baron Scrope of Masham (1350)	Thomas Scrope, 5th Baron Scrope of Masham	1455	1475	
Baron Botreaux (1368)	William de Botreaux, 3rd Baron Botreaux	1392	1462	Died
Baron Botreaux (1368)	Margaret Hungerford, 4th Baroness Botreaux	1462	1477	
Baron Scrope of Bolton (1371)	John Scrope, 5th Baron Scrope of Bolton	1459	1498	
Baron Lumley (1384)	Thomas Lumley, 2nd Baron Lumley	1461	1480	Restored
Baron Bergavenny (1392)	George Neville, 4th Baron Bergavenny	1447	1492	
Baron Grey of Codnor (1397)	Henry Grey, 4th Baron Grey of Codnor	1444	1496	
Baron Berkeley (1421)	James Berkeley, 1st Baron Berkeley	1421	1463	Died
Baron Berkeley (1421)	William de Berkeley, 2nd Baron Berkeley	1463	1492	
Baron Hungerford (1426)	Robert Hungerford, 3rd Baron Hungerford	1459	1461	Attainted
Baron Latimer (1432)	George Neville, 1st Baron Latimer	1432	1469	Died
Baron Latimer (1432)	Richard Neville, 2nd Baron Latimer	1469	1530	
Baron Dudley (1440)	John Sutton, 1st Baron Dudley	1440	1487	
Baron Sudeley (1441)	Ralph Boteler, 1st Baron Sudeley	1441	1473	
Baron Saye and Sele (1447)	William Fiennes, 2nd Baron Saye and Sele	1450	1471	
Baron Beauchamp of Powick (1447)	John Beauchamp, 1st Baron Beauchamp of Powick	1447	1475	
Baron Rivers (1448)	Richard Woodville, 1st Baron Rivers	1448	1469	Created Earl Rivers in 1466, title held by his heirs until 1491, when it became extinct
Baron Stourton (1448)	John Stourton, 1st Baron Stourton	1448	1462	Died
Baron Stourton (1448)	William Stourton, 2nd Baron Stourton	1462	1479	
Baron Vessy (1449)	Henry Bromflete, 1st Baron Vessy	1449	1469	Died, Barony became extinct
Baron Bonville (1449)	William Bonville, 1st Baron Bonville	1449	1461	Died, title succeeded by the more senior Baroness Harington, and held by her heirs until 1554, when it was forfeited
Baron Egremont (1449)	Thomas Percy, 1st Baron Egremont	1449	1460	Died, title extinct
Baron Bergavenny (1450)	Edward Nevill, 1st Baron Bergavenny	1450	1476	
Baron Richemount (1450)	Thomas Grey, 1st Baron Richemount	1450	1461	Attainted, and his honours were forfeited
Baron Berners (1455)	John Bourchier, 1st Baron Berners	1455	1474	
Baron Stanley (1456)	Thomas Stanley, 2nd Baron Stanley	1459	1504	
Baron Dacre of Gilsland (1459)	Randolph Dacre, 1st Baron Dacre	1459	1461	Died, title extinct
Baron Neville (1459)	John Neville, Baron Neville	1459	1461	Died, attainted and title forfeited
Baron Montagu (1461)	John Neville, 1st Baron Montagu	1461	1471	New creation
Baron Cromwell (1461)	Humphrey Bourchier, 1st Baron Cromwell	1461	1471	New creation
Baron Hastings de Hastings (1461)	William Hastings, 1st Baron Hastings	1461	1483	New creation
Baron Ogle (1461)	Robert Ogle, 1st Baron Ogle	1461	1469	New creation, died
Baron Ogle (1461)	Owen Ogle, 2nd Baron Ogle	1469	1485	
Baron Wenlock (1461)	John Wenlock, 1st Baron Wenlock	1461	1471	New creation
Baron Mountjoy (1465)	Walter Blount, 1st Baron Mountjoy	1465	1474	New creation

== Peerage of Scotland ==
Title	Holder	Date gained	Date lost	Notes
Duke of Rothesay (1398)	James Stewart, Duke of Rothesay	1452	1460	Acceded to the Throne of Scotland
Duke of Albany (1456)	Alexander Stewart, Duke of Albany	1456	1483	
Earl of Ross (1215)	John of Islay, Earl of Ross	1449	1476	
Earl of Sutherland (1235)	John de Moravia, 7th Earl of Sutherland	1427	1460	Died
Earl of Sutherland (1235)	John de Moravia, 8th Earl of Sutherland	1460	1508	
Earl of Orkney (1379)	William Sinclair, Earl of Orkney	1410	1476	
Earl of Angus (1389)	George Douglas, 4th Earl of Angus	1446	1463	Died
Earl of Angus (1389)	Archibald Douglas, 5th Earl of Angus	1463	1513	
Earl of Crawford (1398)	David Lindsay, 5th Earl of Crawford	1453	1495	
Earl of Menteith (1427)	Malise Graham, 1st Earl of Menteith	1427	1490	
Earl of Huntly (1445)	Alexander Gordon, 1st Earl of Huntly	1445	1470	
Earl of Erroll (1452)	William Hay, 1st Earl of Erroll	1452	1462	Died
Earl of Erroll (1452)	Nicholas Hay, 2nd Earl of Erroll	1462	1470	
Earl of Caithness (1455)	William Sinclair, 1st Earl of Caithness	1455	1476	
Earl of Argyll (1457)	Colin Campbell, 1st Earl of Argyll	1457	1493	
Earl of Atholl (1457)	John Stewart, 1st Earl of Atholl	1457	1512	
Earl of Morton (1458)	James Douglas, 1st Earl of Morton	1458	1493	
Earl of Rothes (1458)	George Leslie, 1st Earl of Rothes	1458	1490	
Earl Marischal (1458)	William Keith, 1st Earl Marischal	1458	1463	Died
Earl Marischal (1458)	William Keith, 2nd Earl Marischal	1463	1483	
Earl of Mar and Garioch (1459)	John Stewart, Earl of Mar and Garioch	1459	1479	
Earl of Arran (1467)	Thomas Boyd, Earl of Arran	1467	1469	New creation; attainted
Earl of Buchan (1469)	James Stewart, 1st Earl of Buchan	1469	1499	New creation
Lord Erskine (1429)	Thomas Erskine, 2nd Lord Erskine	1453	1494	de jure Earl of Mar
Lord Somerville (1430)	John Somerville, 3rd Lord Somerville	1456	1491	
Lord Lorne (1439)	John Stewart, 2nd Lord of Lorne	1449	1463	Died
Lord Lorne (1439)	William Stewart, 3rd Lord of Lorne	1463	1469	Resigned the lordship to his nephew-in-law, the 1st Earl of Argyll
Lord Haliburton of Dirleton (1441)	George Haliburton, 4th Lord Haliburton of Dirleton	1459	1492	
Lord Forbes (1442)	James Forbes, 2nd Lord Forbes	1448	1462	Died
Lord Forbes (1442)	William Forbes, 3rd Lord Forbes	1462	1483	
Lord Crichton (1443)	William Crichton, 3rd Lord Crichton	1454	1484	
Lord Hamilton (1445)	James Hamilton, 1st Lord Hamilton	1445	1479	
Lord Maxwell (1445)	Robert Maxwell, 2nd Lord Maxwell	1454	1485	
Lord Glamis (1445)	Alexander Lyon, 2nd Lord Glamis	1459	1486	
Lord Graham (1445)	Patrick Graham, 1st Lord Graham	1445	1466	Died
Lord Graham (1445)	William Graham, 2nd Lord Graham	1466	1472	
Lord Lindsay of the Byres (1445)	John Lindsay, 1st Lord Lindsay	1445	1482	
Lord Saltoun (1445)	Lawrence Abernethy, 1st Lord Saltoun	1445	1460	Died
Lord Saltoun (1445)	William Abernethy, 2nd Lord Saltoun	1460	1488	
Lord Gray (1445)	Andrew Gray, 1st Lord Gray	1445	1469	Died
Lord Gray (1445)	Andrew Gray, 2nd Lord Gray	1469	1514	
Lord Montgomerie (1449)	Alexander Montgomerie, 1st Lord Montgomerie	1449	1470	
Lord Fleming (1451)	Robert Fleming, 1st Lord Fleming	1451	1494	
Lord Seton (1451)	George Seton, 1st Lord Seton	1451	1478	
Lord Borthwick (1452)	William Borthwick, 1st Lord Borthwick	1452	1470	
Lord Boyd (1454)	Robert Boyd, 1st Lord Boyd	1454	1482	
Lord Oliphant (1455)	Laurence Oliphant, 1st Lord Oliphant	1455	1498	New creation
Lord Kennedy (1457)	Gilbert Kennedy, 1st Lord Kennedy	1457	1489	
Lord Livingston (1458)	James Livingston, 1st Lord Livingston	1458	1467	Died
Lord Livingston (1458)	James Livingston, 2nd Lord Livingston	1467	1497	
Lord Hailes (1458)	Patrick Hepburn, 1st Lord Hailes	1458	1483	
Lord Avandale (1459)	Andrew Stewart, 1st Lord Avandale	1459	1488	
Lord Cathcart (1460)	Alan Cathcart, 1st Lord Cathcart	1460	1497	New creation
Lord Darnley (1460)	John Stewart, 1st Baron Darnley	1460	1495	New creation
Lord Lovat (1464)	Hugh Fraser, 1st Lord Lovat	1464	1500	New creation

== Peerage of Ireland ==
Title	Holder	Date gained	Date lost	Notes
Earl of Ulster (1264)	Richard of York, 8th Earl of Ulster	1425	1460	Died
Earl of Ulster (1264)	Edward of York, 9th Earl of Ulster	1460	1461	Title merged in the Crown
Earl of Kildare (1316)	Thomas FitzGerald, 7th Earl of Kildare	1434	1478	
Earl of Ormond (1328)	James Butler, 5th Earl of Ormond	1452	1461	Died
Earl of Ormond (1328)	John Butler, 6th Earl of Ormond	1461	1478	
Earl of Desmond (1329)	James FitzGerald, 6th Earl of Desmond	1420	1463	Died
Earl of Desmond (1329)	Thomas FitzGerald, 7th Earl of Desmond	1463	1468	Died
Earl of Desmond (1329)	James FitzGerald, 8th Earl of Desmond	1468	1487	
Earl of Waterford (1446)	John Talbot, 2nd Earl of Waterford	1453	1460	Died
Earl of Waterford (1446)	John Talbot, 3rd Earl of Waterford	1460	1473	
Baron Athenry (1172)	Thomas II de Bermingham	1428	1473	
Baron Kingsale (1223)	Patrick de Courcy, 11th Baron Kingsale	1430	1460	Died
Baron Kingsale (1223)	Nicholas de Courcy, 12th Baron Kingsale	1460	1476	
Baron Kerry (1223)	Thomas Fitzmaurice, 8th Baron Kerry	1410	1469	Died
Baron Kerry (1223)	Edmond Fitzmaurice, 9th Baron Kerry	1469	1498	
Baron Barry (1261)	William Barry, 8th Baron Barry	1420	1480	
Baron Gormanston (1370)	Robert Preston, 4th Baron Gormanston	1450	1503	
Baron Slane (1370)	David Fleming, 5th Baron Slane	1457	1463	Died
Baron Slane (1370)	Thomas Fleming, 6th Baron Slane	1463	1470	
Baron Howth (1425)	Christopher St Lawrence, 2nd Baron Howth	1430	1465	Died
Baron Howth (1425)	Robert St Lawrence, 3rd Baron Howth	1465	1485	
Baron Killeen (1449)	Christopher Plunkett, 2nd Baron Killeen	1455	1462	Died
Baron Killeen (1449)	Christopher Plunkett, 3rd Baron Killeen	1462	1469	Died
Baron Killeen (1449)	Edmond Plunkett, 4th Baron Killeen	1469	1510	
Baron Trimlestown (1461)	Robert Barnewall, 1st Baron Trimlestown	1461	1470	New creation
Baron Dunsany (1462)	Christopher Plunkett, 1st Baron of Dunsany	1462	1463	New creation; died
Baron Dunsany (1462)	Richard Plunkett, 2nd Baron of Dunsany	1463	1480	
Baron Portlester (1462)	Rowland FitzEustace, 1st Baron Portlester	1462	1496	New creation
Baron Ratoath (1468)	Robert Bold, 1st Baron Ratoath	1468	1479	New creation

Preceded by List of peers 1450–1459	Lists of peers by decade 1460–1469	Succeeded by List of peers 1470–1479
