= Dunmore Abbey =

Irish abbey and monument

- Mainistir Dhún Mór
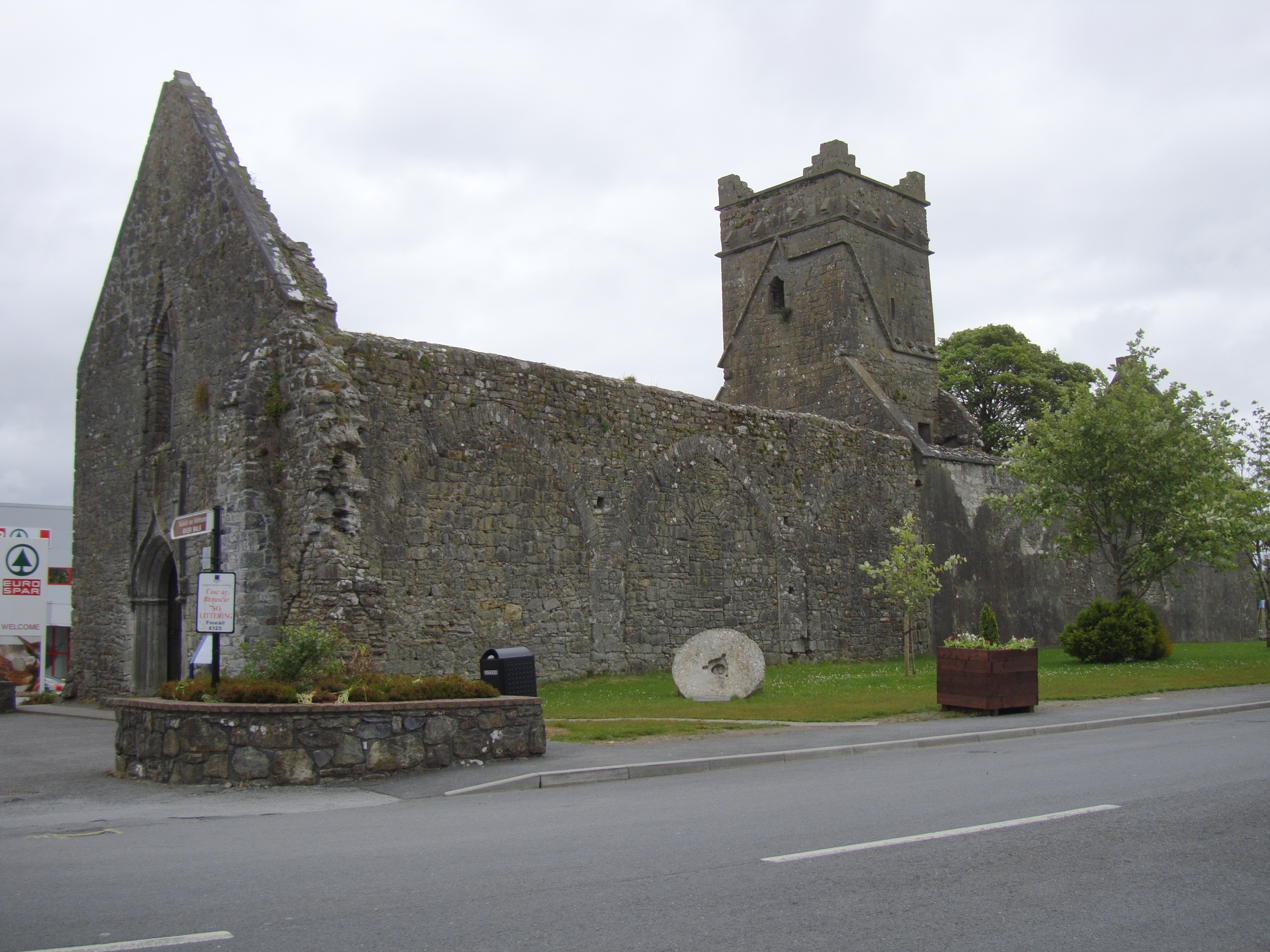

- Location within Ireland

Monastery information
- Other names: Donmore Mac Oryshe; Downemore; Dominensis
- Order: Augustinians
- Established: c. 1423
- Disestablished: 18th century
- Diocese: Clonfert

People
- Founder: Walter de Bermingham

Architecture
- Status: Inactive
- Style: Late Gothic

Site
- Location: Abbeyland North, Dunmore, County Galway
- Coordinates: 53.620458°N 8.741628°W
- Public access: yes

Dunmore Abbey is a medieval Augustinian friary and national monument located in County Galway, Ireland.

== Location ==
Dunmore Friary is located in the northern part of Dunmore, County Galway.

== History ==
Dunmore was an early monastic site, allegedly founded by Saint Patrick in the 5th century.

The site was founded for the Augustinian friars before 1425 by Walter de Bermingham, Baron Athenry.

Dunmore Abbey was dissolved in 1569, but the friars remained in occupancy. After the Reformation part of the friary was converted into a parish church of the Church of Ireland.

In 1574 the land was held by John Fitz-Thomas Burke.

In 1641 there were still a prior and thirty friars in the community. The friars left in 1645, taking refuge at Mayfield.

In 1698 a comprehensive inventory was made.

== Buildings ==
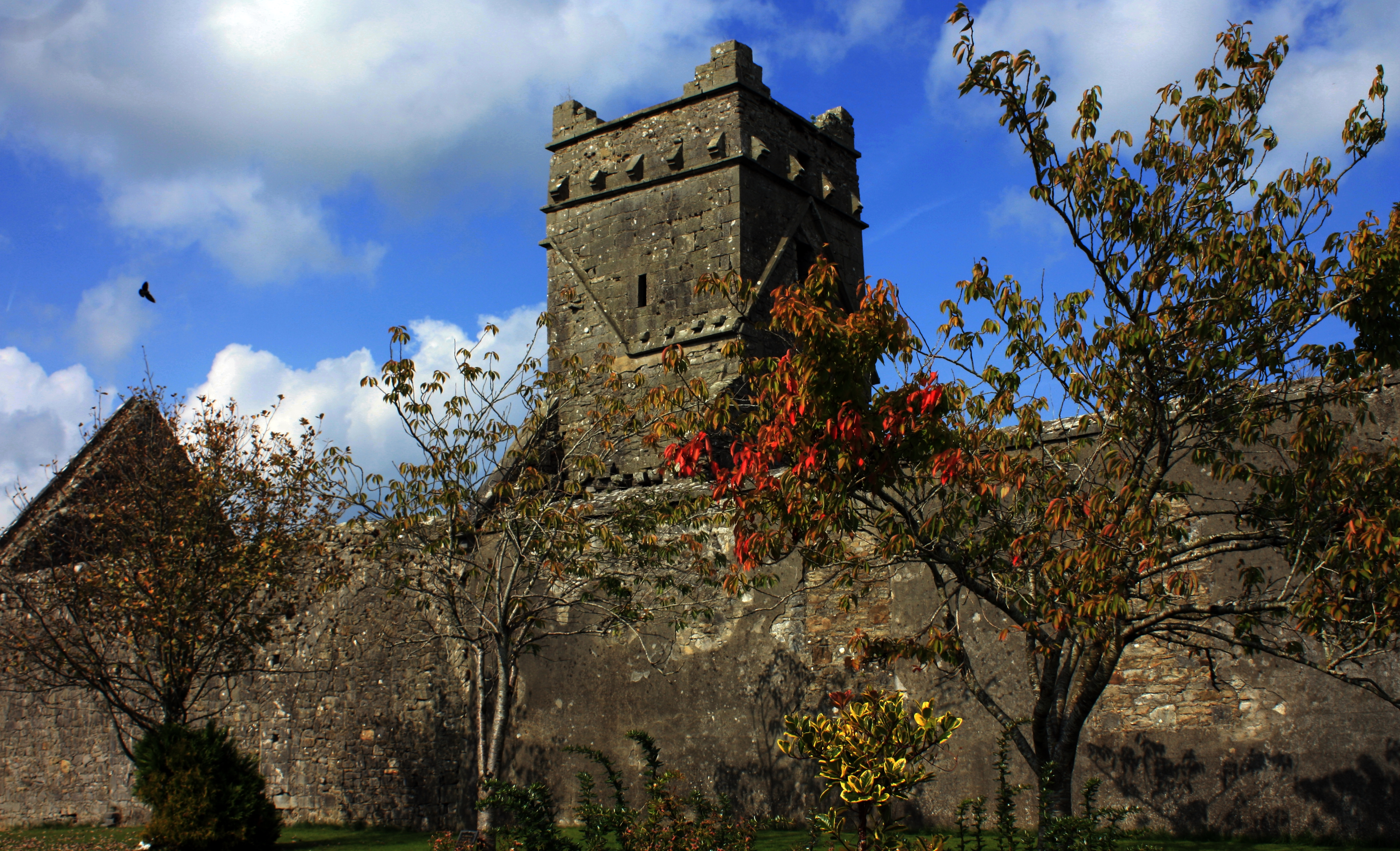
The abbey church

There is a fine and decorative 15th century west doorway.
