= Thomas Bermingham =

Thomas Bermingham may refer to:

- Thomas Bermingham (priest) (1918–1998), American Jesuit priest, teacher and scholar
- Thomas Bermingham, 1st Earl of Louth (1717–1799), Anglo-Irish politician and peer
- Thomas de Bermingham (died 1375), Anglo-Irish lord
- Thomas II de Bermingham (died 1473), Anglo-Irish lord
- Thomas III de Bermingham (died 1500), Anglo-Irish lord
- Tom Bermingham (1940–2020), Irish Gaelic footballer

== See also ==
- Tom Birmingham (1949–2023), American politician
