= James Ellis Fleming =

James Ellis Fleming (fl. 1824–1832) was an Irish claimant to the title of 20th Baron Slane.

== Ancestry and claim ==
Fleming was a resident of Tuam, County Galway, and claimed to be a direct descendant of Simon Fleming, 1st Baron Slane (died 1370) was the first Baron Slane.

Ellis Fleming claimed the title in succession to Christopher, 19th Baron Slane, who died in 1771, been a descendant of Christopher, 12th Baron Slane (died 1625), via his third son, John. Christopher had issue "Six sons, four of whom died without issue ... Thomas, his eldest son, embraced the profession of a friar, and renounced all his right in favour of his brother William."

Thomas is listed as the 13th Baron but renounced it in favour of his brother in 1629. Thus, William Fleming became the 14th Baron Slane, dying in 1641. However, the 14th Baron's last direct male heir, Christopher, died in 1771, which opened the possibility that the descendants of John Fleming could accede to the title.

James Ellis Fleming activated his claim to the title in 1824. By that time, descendants of the last baron's female relatives had also issue claims. They were all listed in The Gentleman's Magazine January–June 1832. However, none of the claims succeeded as the title is, as of 2010, still dormant.

Ellis Fleming's ultimate fate is currently unknown.
