= John Tiptoft, 1st Baron Tiptoft =

Member of the Parliament of England

Arms of Tibetot (or Tiptoft): Argent, a saltire engrailed gules

John Tiptoft, 1st Baron Tiptoft (died 27 January 1443) was a Knight of the Shire for Huntingdonshire and Somerset, Speaker of the House of Commons, Treasurer of the Household, Chief Butler of England, Treasurer of the Exchequer and Seneschal of Landes and Aquitaine.

== Early life ==
This English nobleman was the eldest son and heir of Sir Pain Tiptoft (died c. 1413) by his spouse, Agnes, née Wrothe (d. bef. 1413). He was lord of the manors of Burwell and Eversden, in Cambridgeshire. In 1413, he was heir to his first cousin, Elizabeth Wrothe, wife of Sir William Palton, Kt., by which he inherited the manors of Nether Wallop, Hampshire, Worcesters (in Enfield), Middlesex, and Redlynch (in Downton, Wiltshire).

== Career ==
Tiptoft's early rise to prominence rested on fortuitous connexions. His father, Sir Payn, was closely attached to Richard, earl of Arundel, one of the Lords Appellant of 1388, but he himself joined the household of another of their number, Henry of Bolingbroke, so that as a young esquire, between April and September 1397, he spent 125 days serving infra curia at a wage of 7½d. a day. He continued in Henry's service right up to his exile, and it is highly probable that he and his father rallied to the Lancastrian banner soon after Bolingbroke's landing in Yorkshire to claim his birthright.

John was among the 46 esquires knighted by Henry on the eve of his coronation, and it was as a "King's knight" that, on 13 November 1399, he was formally retained for life with a substantial annuity of 100 marks charged on the royal revenues from Cambridgeshire and Huntingdonshire.

He was returned to Parliament as knight of the shire for Huntingdonshire in January and October, 1404 and again in 1406, when he was elected Speaker of the House of Commons. He represented Somerset in 1414.

He was appointed Treasurer of the Household (1406–1408), Chief Butler of England in 1407, Treasurer of the Exchequer (1408–1409), Seneschal of Aquitaine (1415–1423), Councillor of Regency to Henry VI (1422–1443) and Lord Steward of the Household (1426–1432).

On 7 January 1426, he was summoned to the House of Lords whereby he was created Baron Tiptoft.

== Marriage and progeny ==
John Tiptoft married twice, leaving progeny by his 2nd marriage only:

- Firstly, before 24 February 1408, to a widow, Philippa Talbot (c. 1367 – 1417), daughter of Sir John Talbot, of Richard's Castle, Herefordshire. They had no issue.
- He married secondly, by royal licence dated 28 February 1422, to Joyce Charleton (c. 1404 – 1446), the younger daughter and co-heiress of Edward Charleton, 5th Baron Cherleton by his first wife Eleanor Holland. By Joyce Charleton he had the following children:
  - John Tiptoft, 1st Earl of Worcester (1427–1470), whose only son Edward Tiptoft, 2nd Earl of Worcester died in 1485, a minor without issue.
  - Philippa Tiptoft (c. 1423 – after January 1487), married Thomas de Ros, 9th Baron de Ros (1427–1464).
  - Joanna Tiptoft (c. 1425 – 1494), married, in 1435, Sir Edmund Ingoldsthorpe (c. 1421 – 1456), of Burgh Green, Cambridgeshire.
  - Joyce Tiptoft (aft. 1425 – c. 1470), married Sir Edmund Sutton.

== Death and burial ==
Sir John, 1st Lord Tiptoft, was buried at Enfield in Middlesex, early in February 1443. His widow, Joyce (or Joice), was buried in St Andrew's Church, Enfield Town, c. 1446.

== See also ==
- Baron Tibetot

== Notes ==
Political offices
| Preceded by Sir William Esturmy | Speaker of the House of Commons; 1405–1406 | Succeeded by Thomas Chaucer |
| Preceded by Nicholas Bubwith | Lord High Treasurer; 1408–1410 | Succeeded by The Lord Scrope of Masham |
| Preceded by Thomas Chaucer | Chief Butler of England; 1434–1443 | Succeeded by The Lord Wenlock |
Peerage of England
| New creation | Baron Tiptoft; 1426–1443 | Succeeded by John Tiptoft |
