= Simon Fleming, 1st Baron Slane =

14th-century Irish baron

Simon Fleming (died 1370) is the first Baron Slane whose holding of the title can be conclusively established.

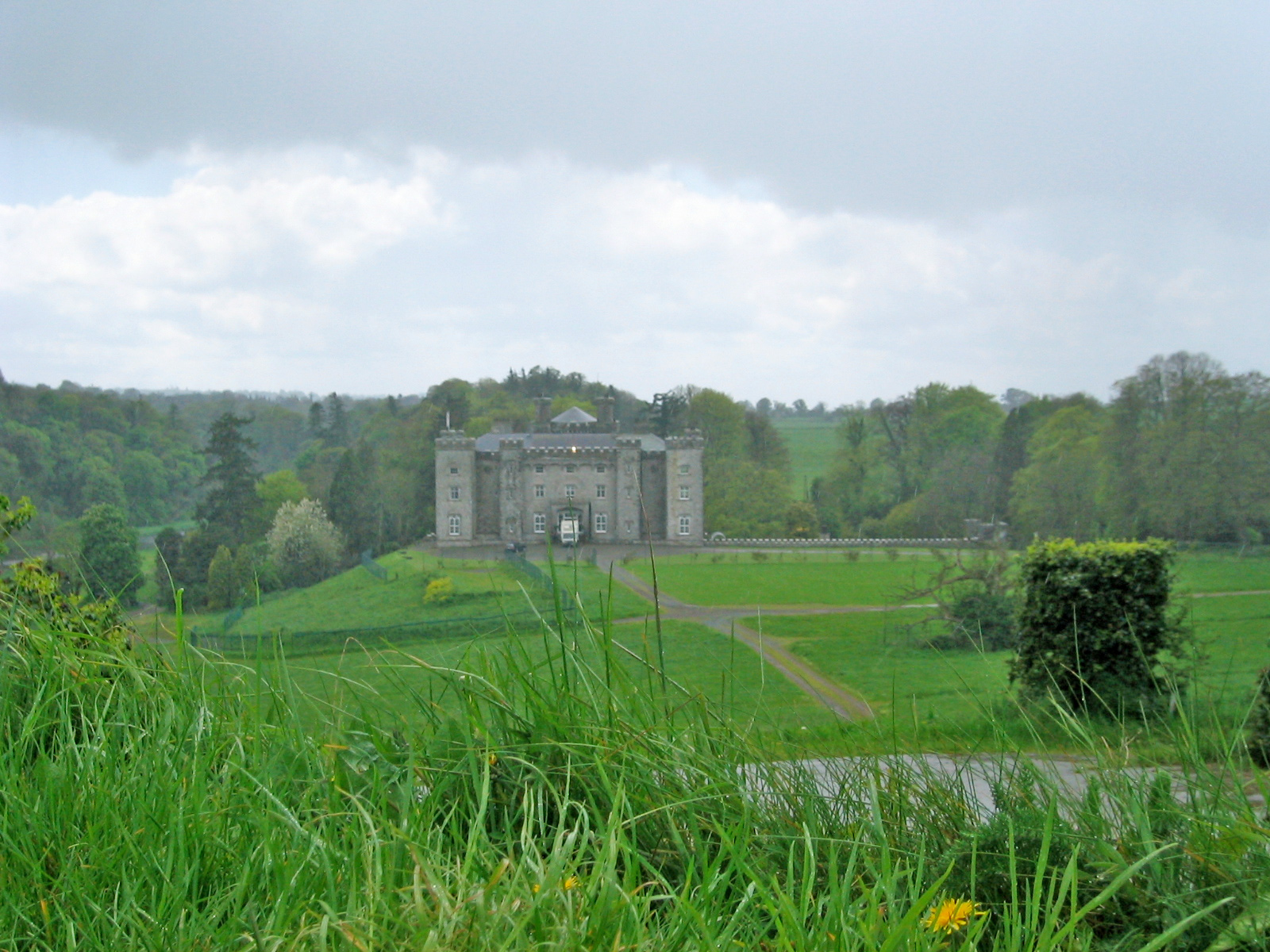
Slane Castle, Co. Meath, Ireland

Fleming was a descendant of Archembald le Fleming of Bratton Fleming, Devon, who was alive in 1087. Archembald's grandson, Archembald fitz Stephen le Fleming, came to Ireland with King Henry II of England in 1171 and participated in Hugh de Lacy's plantation of the Kingdom of Mide. He was a great-great-grandfather of Simon. Simon was the son of Sir Baldwin Fleming, and Maud de Geneville, daughter of Simon de Geneville of Culmullin and Joan Fitz Leones. Simon de Geneville was a younger son of Geoffrey de Geneville, 1st Baron Geneville, Justiciar of Ireland.

Simon was a member of the Irish Parliament of 1370. He became the lord of Slane in 1335 on the death of his father. In 1346 he served as Commissioner of the Peace in County Meath. In 1352 Slane was declared forfeit to the Crown, but Simon recovered it three years later. He had been knighted before 1365. He was in close attendance on Lionel of Antwerp, younger son of King Edward III, the Lord Lieutenant of Ireland, during his years in Ireland. He spent much of his time in England, and acquired extensive lands in Devon and Cornwall (he was related by marriage to a number of prominent families in those counties, notably the Bassets and Champernownes).

In 1363–64 he was a prominent member of the "reform party", which campaigned against the widespread corruption and maladministration of the Irish Government: he was part of a powerful delegation sent by the Irish House of Commons to England to outline their grievances, and King Edward III appointed him to a royal commission to consider what reforms to government were necessary. The reform party had some success: in particular, they secured the removal from office, for a time, of Thomas de Burley, the notoriously corrupt Lord Chancellor of Ireland.

Simon married Cecily Champernowne, daughter of Sir Thomas Champernowne, of Modbury, Devon and his wife Eleanor de Rohart. The Champernownes were a distinguished and long-established Devonshire family: notable later members included Kat Ashley, née Champernowne, the much-loved governess of Queen Elizabeth I, and Sir Walter Raleigh, whose mother was a Champernowne.

Simon was succeeded by his son, Thomas (c. 1358 – c. 1434/1435), who with his own son Christopher cut a rather villainous path in the 1390s. He also had at least two daughters, Matilda, who married Luke Cusack, and Margaret, who married Sir William Basset of Tehidy, Cornwall.

== Sources ==
- G. E. C., ed. Geoffrey F. White. The Complete Peerage. (London: St. Catherine Press, 1953) Vol. XII, Part 1, p. 3–4.
- Smith, Brendan Crisis and Survival in Late Medieval Ireland- the English of Louth and their Neighbours 1330-1450 (Oxford University Press, 2013)
- Fleming, F. Lawrence, A Genealogical History of the Barons Slane (Rothersthorpe: Paragon Press, 2008)

Peerage of Ireland
New creation	Baron Slane; 1370	Succeeded by Thomas Fleming
