= Baron Tibetot =

Abeyant title in the Peerage of England

Arms of Tibetot (or Tiptoft): Argent, a saltire engrailed gules

Baron Tibetot (or Tiptoft) is an abeyant title in the Peerage of England. It was created on 10 March 1308 as a barony by writ. It fell into abeyance in 1372. These were the immediate descendants of the crusader Sir Robert de Tiptoft (died 1298) and his wife Eva de Chaworth, early benefactors of the house of Ipswich Greyfriars.

== Barons Tibetot (1308) ==
- Payn Tiptoft, 1st Baron Tibetot (1279–1314) (killed at the Battle of Bannockburn)
- John Tiptoft, 2nd Baron Tibetot (1313–1367)
- Robert Tiptoft, 3rd Baron Tibetot (1341–1372)

== Barons Tiptoft (1426) ==
- John Tiptoft, 1st Baron Tiptoft (1426–1443)
- John Tiptoft, 1st Earl of Worcester (1443–1470)
- Edward Tiptoft, 2nd Earl of Worcester (1470–1485)
