= Walter de Bermingham =

Anglo-Irish peer (died 1428)

Walter de Bermingham was an Anglo-Irish lord who died in 1428.

Little seems to be recorded of his term. In 1426, the annals relate that

John, son of Mac Feorais Bermingham, was slain by Thomas, his own brother's son.

When Walter died in 1428, he was succeeded by a Thomas de Bermingham.

Peerage of Ireland
Preceded by Thomas de Bermingham	Baron Athenry; 1375–1428	Succeeded by Thomas II de Bermingham
