= Thomas Fleming, 2nd Baron Slane =

Irish knight, politician, and kidnapper

Thomas Fleming (1358-1435), 2nd Baron Slane, was a member of the Parliament of Ireland from 1394-1395, and again from 1401-12. He is mainly remembered for kidnapping the senior judge Richard Rede, from whom he extorted a large ransom. He managed to escape punishment for the crime.

== Background ==
Thomas was the son of Simon Fleming, 1st Baron Slane, and his wife Cecily Champernowne, daughter of Sir Thomas Champernowne of Modbury, Devon and Eleanor de Rohart. He was the Commander of the Guardians of the Peace in County Meath in about 1385, and again in 1400. He was knighted in 1396. In 1412 he was licensed to hold a market and fair at Drumconrath in County Meath.

== Abduction of Richard Rede ==
From what is known of his character, Thomas seems to have been ruthless, determined and unscrupulous. The marriage of the wealthy heiress Elizabeth Netterville of Dowth to Richard Rede, Chief Baron of the Irish Exchequer, had given grave offence to other landowning families in Meath, who had hoped to marry her to one or other of their heirs. In 1394, some years before her marriage, Elizabeth had been abducted by the Cusack and Darcy families in an apparent attempt to gain control of her lands, and there were rumours of a similar plot in 1400. Slane and his son Christopher evidently settled on the simpler plan of extracting money from her husband. On April 1401 they ambushed Rede at Skryne, and imprisoned him in their castle nearby. He was not released until he paid a ransom of £1000, a vast sum at the time, and he was also robbed of £200 which he had on his person, and some valuable official records.

So serious a crime, involving an assault on a senior judge by a Commissioner for the Peace, might have been expected to bring down severe retribution on the wrongdoers. The outraged Rede himself demanded the most severe penalties so that a suitable example be made of all who would plan such things. At first, the Crown appeared to take a grave view of the matter, and a powerful commission was appointed to arrest Slane and his wife. In that era, however, the nobility could generally win a royal pardon even for the most serious of crimes, and Slane was pardoned in October 1401 after paying a £30 fine (a tiny sum compared to what he had extorted from Rede). His son Christopher also received a full pardon, which covered all acts of sedition committed in the previous reign as well as the present. Since Christopher was probably not quite twenty, this phrase casts an interesting light on his early career. A later pardon of 1404 to Thomas for all "alienation and intrusions" seems to relate to unlawfully seizing lands rather than to any violent crime. He had leave to travel to England in 1403, another sign that he had regained favour.

== Family ==
He married firstly Elizabeth Preston, daughter of Christopher Preston, 2nd Baron Gormanston and his wife Elizabeth de Londres: they had at least two sons: Christopher Fleming, 3rd Baron Slane, and Sir William Fleming. William was the father of James Fleming, 7th Baron Slane. He married secondly Katherine Butler, who survived him. Katherine was awarded as her dower one-third of the manor house of Slane: her precise entitlements are set out in some detail in the Calendar of State Papers.

== Sources ==
- G. E. C., ed. Geoffrey F. White. The Complete Peerage. (London: St. Catherine Press, 1953) Vol. XII, Part 1, p. 4-5.
- Patent Roll 3 Henry IV 22 October 1401- pardon to Christopher Fleming, son of Thomas Fleming, Baron Slane for detention of Richard Rede, Chief Baron of the Exchequer and other seditions
- Slane Peerage case (1835) Reports of Cases decided by the House of Lords Vol. 4
- Smith, Brendan Crisis and Survival- the English of Louth and their Neighbours 1330-1450 Oxford University Press 2013

== Notes ==
Peerage of Ireland
Preceded by Simon Fleming	Baron Slane; 1370–1435	Succeeded by Christopher Fleming
