= George II, Earl of March =

George de Dunbar, 11th Earl of Dunbar & March, 13th Lord of Annandale, and Lord of the Isle of Man (c. 1370 – after 1457), was the last of his family to hold these titles.

== Early life ==
He was aged about fifty when he succeeded his father, George Dunbar, 10th Earl of March and Dunbar (1340–1422). "George de Dunbarre son of the Earl of March" had safe conduct to pass through England with twenty horsemen to go "beyond the seas" and return, dated 19 March 1399. In August 1405 he was Lieutenant of the castle of Cockburnspath, Berwickshire, and was engaged in various public transactions during his father's lifetime. In 1390 he obtained from King Robert II a grant of his ward-relief and marriage for the Earldom of March and lordship of Annandale; and he acted as a Commissioner for liberating from English captivity Murdoch, son of the Regent Albany, on 7 December 1411, and in 1415. "George de Dounbar, son and heir of the Earl of the Marches of Scotland" had further safe conducts, with numerous other nobles, to travel to England between 1416 and 1419.

== Ambassador ==
On 19 August 1423 "George, Earl of March" and his brother Sir Patrick de Dunbar of Beil were named as part of the embassy sent to negotiate the liberation of King James I of Scotland who had long been a captive in England.

On 28 March 1424, the Earl of March was one of the Conservators of the seven-year truce with England, and met James I and his consort at Durham upon their return to Scotland. He was also present at their Coronation in Scone on 21 May 1424, when he was knighted. However, the following year the earls of Dunbar and Douglas, with the Duke of Albany, and twenty other feudal barons, were suddenly arrested and confined by order of parliament after accusations of corruption in Scottish affairs during James's absence. Albany and his sons, with his father-in-law the Earl of Lennox, were beheaded, but the Earl of Dunbar and most of the other barons were set at liberty, their guilt being less apparent.

In 1427 the earls of Dunbar and Douglas obtained, in London, a truce from King Henry VI of England for two years, which Sir Robert Umfraville, governor of Berwick-upon-Tweed had refused. George was next employed in negotiating more temporary truces with England in June 1429 and the following January; and officiated as sponsor for King James II of Scotland at Holyroodhouse in October 1430.

== Conspiracy and downfall ==
In 1434 Dunbar and his son Patrick were twice in England and the usual jealousies of the Crown and opponents in Scotland were aroused and the earl was arrested upon his return and confined in Edinburgh Castle, while the Earl of Angus, Chancellor Crichton, and Sir Adam Hepburn of Hailes, were dispatched with Letters to the Keeper of Dunbar Castle who immediately surrendered it to the King's authority, Hepburn being left as Constable of the important fortress.

In a parliament which assembled at Perth on 10 January 1435, George, Earl of March, Lord of Dunbar, etc., was accused, not for any treason committed by himself, but for holding his earldoms and estates which were claimed to have been forfeited by his father. The following day "in vain did he plead," says Sir Robert Douglas, "that his father had been pardoned and restored by Albany", and it was answered "that a forfeiture incurred for treason could not be pardoned by a Regent".

The forfeited Earl retired into obscurity in England. A safe-conduct warrant was signed for "George, Earl of Dunbar, with twenty-four horsemen" at Westminster on 31 October 1435. However, it appears he may have been still alive in 1457 when he is mentioned (still as "Earl of March") in a charter to his son, Patrick de Dunbar, of the lands and barony of Kilconquhar, in Fife, held of the Archbishop of St. Andrews as superior.

== Marriages ==
The Earl is said to have married twice: (1) c. 1390, Beatrix (family unknown), by whom he had his "eldest son", the aforementioned Patrick, and in 1421, a dispensation was granted for him to marry as his second wife, Hawise (or Alicia), daughter of Sir William de Hay, Knt., of Locherworth, Peeblesshire. The two wives were said to be closely related to each other, and he to them both.

The children of George and his 1st wife Beatrix are:

- Patrick, of Kilconquhar, Fife, Master of The March, married Elisabeth Sinclair.
- George, entered the church. On 12 February 1433, he was described as "son of the Earl of March, noble on both sides", when he supplicated the Pope to provide him to the canonry and prebendary of Linton, in the collegiate church of Dunbar at £70 per annum.
- Archibald of Dunbar
- Marjory, who married Sir John Swinton, 15th of that Ilk, killed at the Battle of Verneuil, France, in 1424.
- Euphemia (d. 1474), married George Graham
