= Baron Poynings =

Barony in the Peerage of England

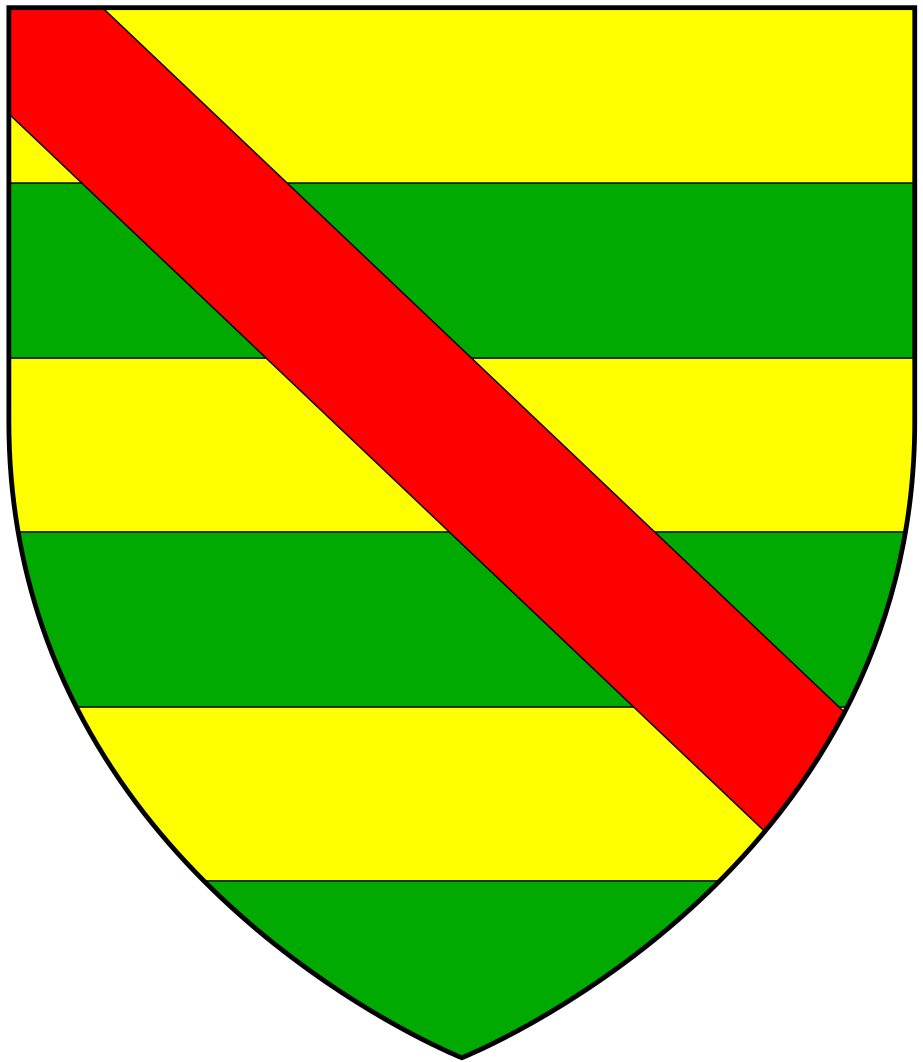
Arms of Poynings: Barry of six or and vert a bend gules. Subsequently quartered by Percy

The title of Baron Poynings was created twice in the Peerage of England.

The first creation was for Sir Michael Poynings, who was summoned to Parliament from 20 November 1348 to 24 February 1368 by writs directed Michaeli de Ponynges, 'whereby he is held to have become Lord Poynings'. On the death of the fourth baron in 1446, his granddaughter, Eleanor Poynings, who had married Sir Henry Percy, later 3rd Earl of Northumberland, became de jure suo jure Baroness Poynings. Percy was summoned to Parliament on her behalf from 14 December 1446 to 26 May 1455 by writs directed Henrico de Percy, chivaler, domino de Poynings. The 3rd Earl was slain at the Battle of Towton on 29 March 1461. His widow, Eleanor, Baroness Poynings, died in February 1484. Their son, Henry Percy, 4th Earl of Northumberland, succeeded to the barony, and since that time the barony of Poynings 'has followed the devolutions of the barony of Percy'. It was attainted in 1571.

The second creation of the barony was for Thomas Poynings, who was created Baron Poynings on 30 January 1545. At his death on 17 or 18 August of the same year, the second creation of the barony became extinct.

== Barons Poynings (1337) ==
- Michael Poynings, 1st Baron Poynings (1317–1369)
- Thomas Poynings, 2nd Baron Poynings (1349–1375)
- Richard Poynings, 3rd Baron Poynings (1359–1387)
- Robert Poynings, 4th Baron Poynings (1380–1446)
- Eleanor Percy, 5th Baroness Poynings (c.1421–1482), granddaughter of the 4th baron
  - Henry Percy, 3rd Earl of Northumberland (1421–1461) summoned to parliament on her behalf
- Henry Percy, 6th Baron Poynings (c.1449–1489)
- For further barons, see Baron Percy and Earl of Northumberland.

== Baron Poynings (1545) ==
- Thomas Poynings, 1st Baron Poynings (d. 1545)
