= Thomas II de Bermingham =

Anglo-Irish peer (died 1473)

Thomas II de Bermingham was an Anglo-Irish lord who died in 1473.

The succession to the lordship is unclear for much of the 15th and early 16th centuries. According to the annals, in 1426:

John, son of Mac Feorais Bermingham, was slain by Thomas, his own brother's son.

When Walter died in 1428, he was succeeded by a Thomas de Bermingham. The Complete Peerage states that this Thomas was a son of Walter.

Peerage of Ireland
Preceded by Walter de Bermingham	Baron Athenry; 1375–1428	Succeeded by Thomas III de Bermingham
