= Malise Graham, 1st Earl of Menteith =

Scottish noble

Malise Graham, 1st Earl of Menteith (c. 1407–1490) was a 15th-century Scottish magnate, who was the heir to the Scottish throne between 1437 and 1451, if Elizabeth Mure's children were not counted as lawful heirs (a question that hadn't been addressed).

By 1437, all the male descendants of Elizabeth Mure had been executed, or had otherwise died, except for the king himself, James II, leaving only the heirs general. Robert II had married Elizabeth Mure in a manner that was considered uncanonical, making the legitimacy of his children by her questionable. A 1373 Act of the Scottish Parliament avoided this issue by expressly putting the sons and their own heirs male into the succession, but it did not answer the question of whether the female descendants of Elizabeth Mure counted as lawful heirs.

Malise was Robert II's grandson, and senior heir, by his second wife, about whom the canonicity of the marriage was undoubted. He was also the most senior male heir (regardless of the legitimacy of Elizabeth Mure's marriage).

His escutcheon is described as "Chequy, upon a fess, three escallops".

== Biography ==
He is the first of his name to have borne the title of Earl of Menteith in his own right. He was the only son of Sir Patrick Graham of Kincardine. Patrick was the younger brother of Sir Robert Graham; both of them being sons of Sir Patrick Graham, ancestor of the Earls and Dukes of Montrose. They are believed to have been direct descendants of John de Menteith, laird of Ruskie, younger son of Mary I, Countess of Menteith and her husband, Walter "Bailloch" Stewart.

Sir John Menteith had become infamous for handing over Sir William Wallace to the English during the Wars of Scottish Independence after he was betrayed by his servant Jack Short.

The younger Sir Patrick Graham married Euphemia Stewart, Countess Palatine of Strathearn, and became in her right Earl of Strathearn. Their son Malise, whose name was an anglicisation of the Gaelic name Maol Íosa, was born about 1407, or perhaps later. It is through his mother that he descends from Robert II.

During the earlier years of his life he bore the title Earl of Strathearn, and as such was proposed as a hostage for King James I; he was named among those who welcomed King James at Durham in March 1424. The King, however, took advantage of the Earl's minority, and deprived him of the earldom of Strathearn, making him Earl of Menteith instead. The charter of the new earldom was dated 6 September 1427. His reduction of land from all of Strathearn to just Menteith was likely an indirect result of the death of Robert Stewart, Duke of Albany who was said to have died in Stirling Castle in 1420. The lands named in the grant to be part of the reshaped earldom, many of which can still be identified, indicate that he received the newly constituted earldom comprehended the whole of Aberfoyle parish and a portion of that of Port of Menteith. But this was only the smaller half of the original earldom, the remainder being annexed to the Crown.

Two months after receiving the charter, in November 1427, Earl Malise entered England as a hostage for King James I, and was confined in the castle of Pontefract, where he was not released until 17 June 1453. During this period, in April 1440, he was assessed for taxation under the alien subsidies.

James, Lord Hamilton, who had married the Earl's sister, Euphemia Graham, widow of Archibald Douglas, 5th Earl of Douglas, was the chief agent in obtaining the release, and received a grant on 17 December 1453 of the lands in the lordship of Kinpont, West Lothian. The Earl in the charter styles himself Earl of Menteith and Lord of Kinpont, the latter being a very early possession of the Graham family, which had descended to him through his father.

=== Scottish Parliament ===
The Earl appears on various occasions in his place in Parliament, but little is known of his history except that he appears to have become involved in debt. He is said to have been present at the Battle of Sauchieburn on 11 June 1488, and to have fought for the King; but this is doubtful, as he must then have been above eighty years of age. In the retour of his grandson to the estates on 6 May 1493, Earl Malise is said to have died at the peace of King James IV of Scotland.

The exact date of his death is not known, but he was dead before 19 May 1490, perhaps not very long before that date, when a gift was made to John Home of Earlston of the ward of the lands of Gilmerton, held of Malise, Earl of Menteith, and then in the King's hands by his decease.

=== Personal ===
The Earl was at least twice married. His first wife is said to have been Janet de Rochford. On 19 April 1471 Janet, Countess of Malise, Earl of Menteith, is held to be entitled to her terce from Kinpont, belonging to her son Patrick. She probably died not long afterwards, but this is uncertain. In 1490 the Countess of Menteith was named Marion, and she survived her husband, marrying John Drummond before 17 May 1491.

She was still alive in 1530, dying between 28 April and 23 August in that year. The Earl had a great many children, but was succeeded by his grandson, Alexander Graham, 2nd Earl of Menteith.

== Sources ==
- Paul, James Balfour, The Scots Peerage, Vols. VI & VIII, (Edinburgh, 1909)
- Brown, M. H., "Graham, Malise, third earl of Strathearn and first earl of Menteith (1406x13–1490)", Oxford Dictionary of National Biography, Oxford University Press, 2004 accessed 21 May 2007

Peerage of Scotland
Preceded by Eupheme Graham née Stewart	Earl of Strathearn; 1413–1427	Succeeded by Annexed by Crown; Given to: Walter Stewart, Earl of Atholl
Preceded by Vacant	Earl of Menteith; 1427–1490	Succeeded by Alexander Graham
