= Baron Slane =

Title in the Peerage of Ireland

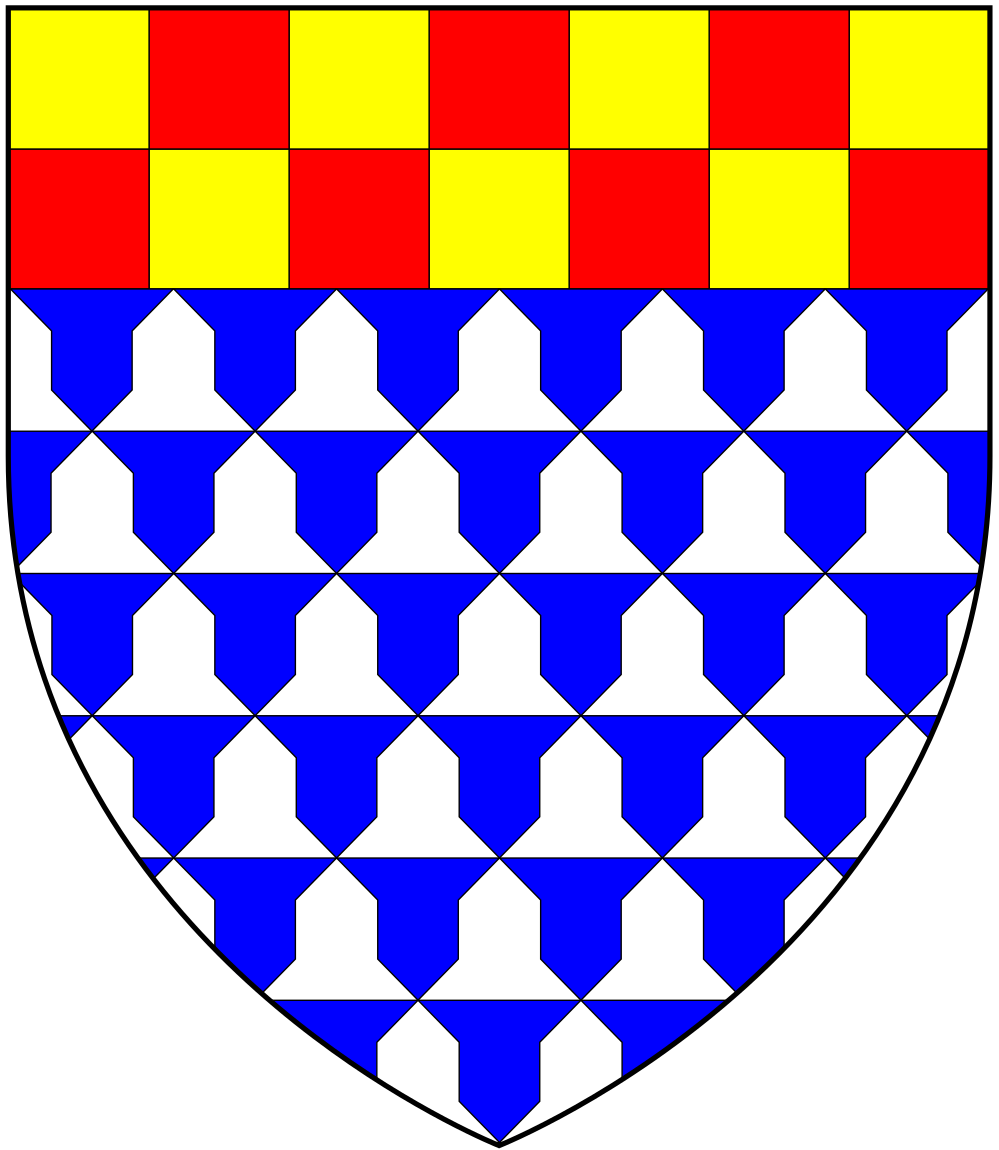
Arms of Fleming, Baron Slane: Vair, a chief chequy or and gules, as shown on the Powell Roll of Arms (c. 1350), Bodleian Library, Oxford.. Also in Lysons' Magna Britannia.

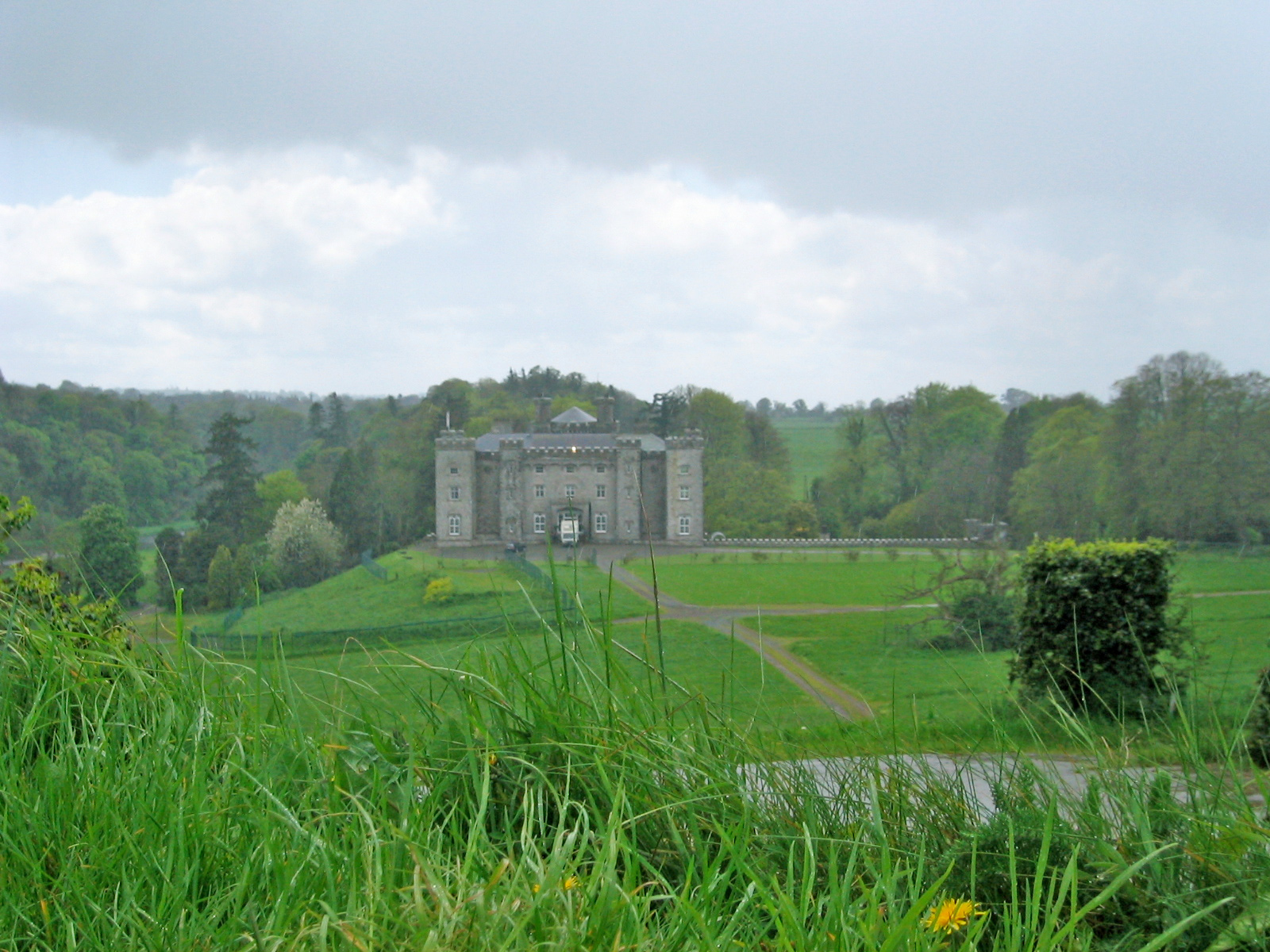
Slane Castle, Co. Meath, Ireland

Baron Slane was a title in the Peerage of Ireland. It was created in 1370 for the Fleming family but forfeited in 1691.

== Origins ==
The Flemings of Slane descend from Erchenbald, otherwise referred to as "Archembald le Fleming", of Bratton Fleming, Devon, who was alive in 1087. Archembald derived his surname due to his birth in Flanders, and came to England during the reign of William I. He was succeeded by his son, Stephen (fl. 1145), whose son, Archembald, arrived in Ireland with Henry II in 1171 and participated in Hugh de Lacy's plantation of the Kingdom of Mide. On the west side of the hill of Slane, there are the remains of a 12th-century motte and bailey which was the settlement, destroyed by the Irish in 1176.

Succeeding Flemings were Stephen, (died c. 1213–1214) and Baldwin (died 1260). Baldwin's son, Richard, is the first of whom some substantial information exists. He married Mary/Maria Martin, daughter of Sir Nicholas FitzMartin the Younger (died 1260). Richard died in 1301, but it is unknown when his wife died. Their son, Baldwin (died 1335), married Matilda/Maude de Genville, daughter of Sir Simon de Genville of Trim. They were the parents of Simon Fleming, 1st Baron Slane, who died on 13 September 1370.

An unusual feature of the title was the ability of the holder to petition the Crown to transfer it: after the death of the 12th Baron in 1625, the 13th Baron successfully petitioned the Crown to transfer the title to his younger brother, since as a Roman Catholic priest he did not expect to live on or manage the family estate. He later became Roman Catholic Archbishop of Dublin.

The 17th Baron, Christopher, was attainted in 1691 for fighting against William III. The title became dormant after the death of the 19th Baron in 1771.

== Later claims ==
After the title became dormant, claimants from junior lines continued to advance their claims into the 19th century. One such was James Ellis Fleming of Tuam, County Galway, who, in 1824, claimed descent from John, third son of Christoper, who had succeeded in 1612. In the case "Slane Peerage case" brought before the House of Lords in 1835, evidence was submitted by the agent of the petitioner. The title remains dormant.

== Barons Slane (created c. 1370) ==
- Simon Fleming, 1st Baron Slane (died 1370)
- Thomas Fleming, 2nd Baron Slane (died 1434–35)
- Christopher Fleming, 3rd Baron Slane (died 1446), son.
- Christopher Fleming, 4th Baron Slane (died 1457), son of John Fleming, son of the 3rd Baron and his first wife Levita Ferrers, daughter of Martin Ferrers of Bere Ferrers, Devon, who predeceased his father. Died without issue.
- David Fleming, 5th Baron Slane (died 1463), younger son by his second wife Elizabeth Wogan (daughter of John Wogan of Rathcoffey Castle) of Christopher Fleming, 3rd Baron Slane (died 1446), thus uncle of the half-blood to Christopher Fleming, 4th Baron Slane (died 1457).
- Thomas Fleming, 6th Baron Slane (died 1470), only son, died without issue.
- James Fleming, 7th Baron Slane (died 1491–92), cousin, son of Sir William Fleming, 2nd son of Thomas Fleming, 2nd Baron Slane (died 1434–35).
- Christopher Fleming, 8th Baron Slane (died 1517), son.
- James Fleming, 9th Baron Slane (died 1577–78), son, died without issue.
- Thomas Fleming, 10th Baron Slane (died 1597), son of James Fleming and great-grandson of the 7th Baron.
- William Fleming, 11th Baron Slane (died 1612), descendant of the 7th Baron.
- Christopher Fleming, 12th Baron Slane (died 1625), son of William, 11th Baron.
- Thomas Fleming, 13th Baron Slane, (1593–1665) Roman Catholic Archbishop of Dublin (eldest son; petitioned for his brother to have the peerage in 1629).
- William Fleming, 14th Baron Slane (died 1641), brother of the Archbishop.
- Charles Fleming, 15th Baron Slane (died 1661)
- Randall Fleming, 16th Baron Slane (died 1676)
- Christopher Fleming, 1st Viscount Longford and 17th Baron Slane (attainted 1691, died 1726), only son.
- William Fleming, 18th Baron Slane (claimant) (died 1747)
- Christopher Fleming, 19th Baron Slane (claimant) (died 1771, at which time the title became dormant.)

== Sources ==
- LibraryIreland.com
- George. E. Cokayne, The Complete Peerage, 1st ed., vol. 7, pp. 156–163
