= The Dethe of the Kynge of Scotis =

- Translator: John Shirley
- Language: Latin
- Subject: James I of Scotland
- Media type: chronicle

The Dethe of the Kynge of Scotis is a 15th-century chronicle which reports the murder of James I of Scotland and its aftermath, including the execution of his killers. The chronicle was, according to a note in one of the manuscripts, originally written in Latin and then translated by John Shirley.

== Background ==
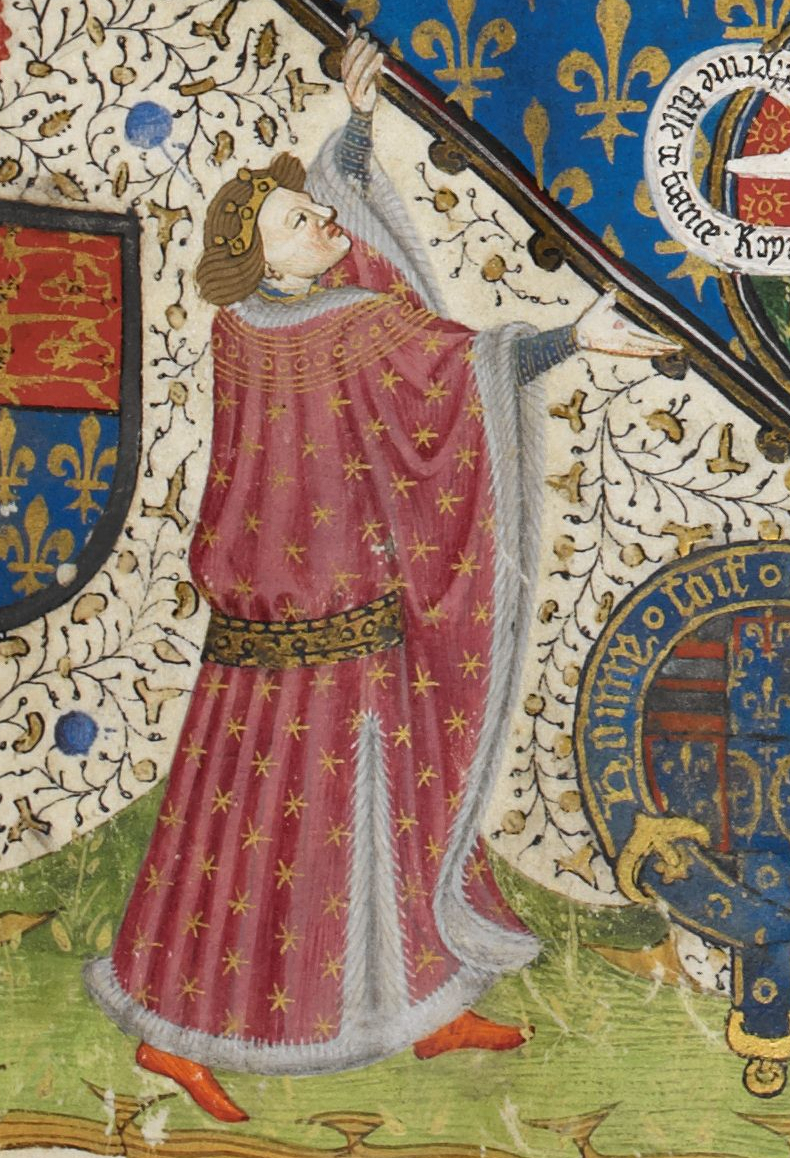
Humphrey, Duke of Gloucester from Talbot Shrewsbury Book c. 1445

=== Manuscripts ===
Three manuscripts have the text, two from the 15th century (BL Additional MSS. 38690 and 5467) and one from the 17th century (National Library of Scotland Advocates MS 17.1.22, likely a copy of BL Add. 38690). In BL Add. 38690, originally a roll which was later cut into an 18-page manuscript, it occupies fols. 9–15, written in the same hand as the first three items (one a "complaint" by Humphrey, Duke of Gloucester read in parliament, the other two documents pertaining to the release of Charles I, Duke of Orléans). In BL Add. 5467, a 224-page manuscript that includes texts on horticulture and cooking, it occupies fols. 72v-84v. The third is a late 17th-century manuscript, with The Dethe on fols. 13–25, copied from BL Add 38690 (also copied was the complaint by Humphrey).

=== Translator ===
BL Add 5467 claims The Dethe was translated by John Shirley from an unknown Latin poem, which Lister M. Matheson accepts on evidence of "numerous spelling peculiarities" with texts known to be done by Shirley. Shirley (ca.1366 – 1456) was a scribe and translator, and possibly a bookseller, who was an important figure in the literary scene of his day. His ascriptions in manuscripts associated with him, for instance, are proof of Chaucer's authorship of some of his lyrics. He was buried at St Bartholomew's Hospital in London.

=== Publication history ===
The Dethe was published in 1797 (by John Pinkerton), in 1818 (anonymously, in an "obscure journal", the Miscellanea Scotica), and in 1837 (by Joseph Stevenson). All three were based on BL Add 5467, which is defective since "a page has been ripped out between the leaves now numbered f. 72" and f. 73'".

In 1904, George Neilson printed the contents of the 17th-century manuscript, which does contain the text missing from BL Add. 5467. The existence of a text of The Dethe in BL Add. 38690 was first noted in 1925. According to Matheson this manuscript is earlier than BL Add. 5467; it was first edited in 1992 by Margaret Connolly. Matheson also notes that The Dethe entered into popular culture by way of four important works of history/historical fiction from the 19th and 20th centuries: John Galt's The Spaewife (1823); Sir Walter Scott's Tales of a Grandfather (1828); Dante Gabriel Rossetti's "The King's Tragedy" (in Ballads and Sonnets, 1881); and Nigel Tranter's Lion Let Loose (1967).

== Contents ==
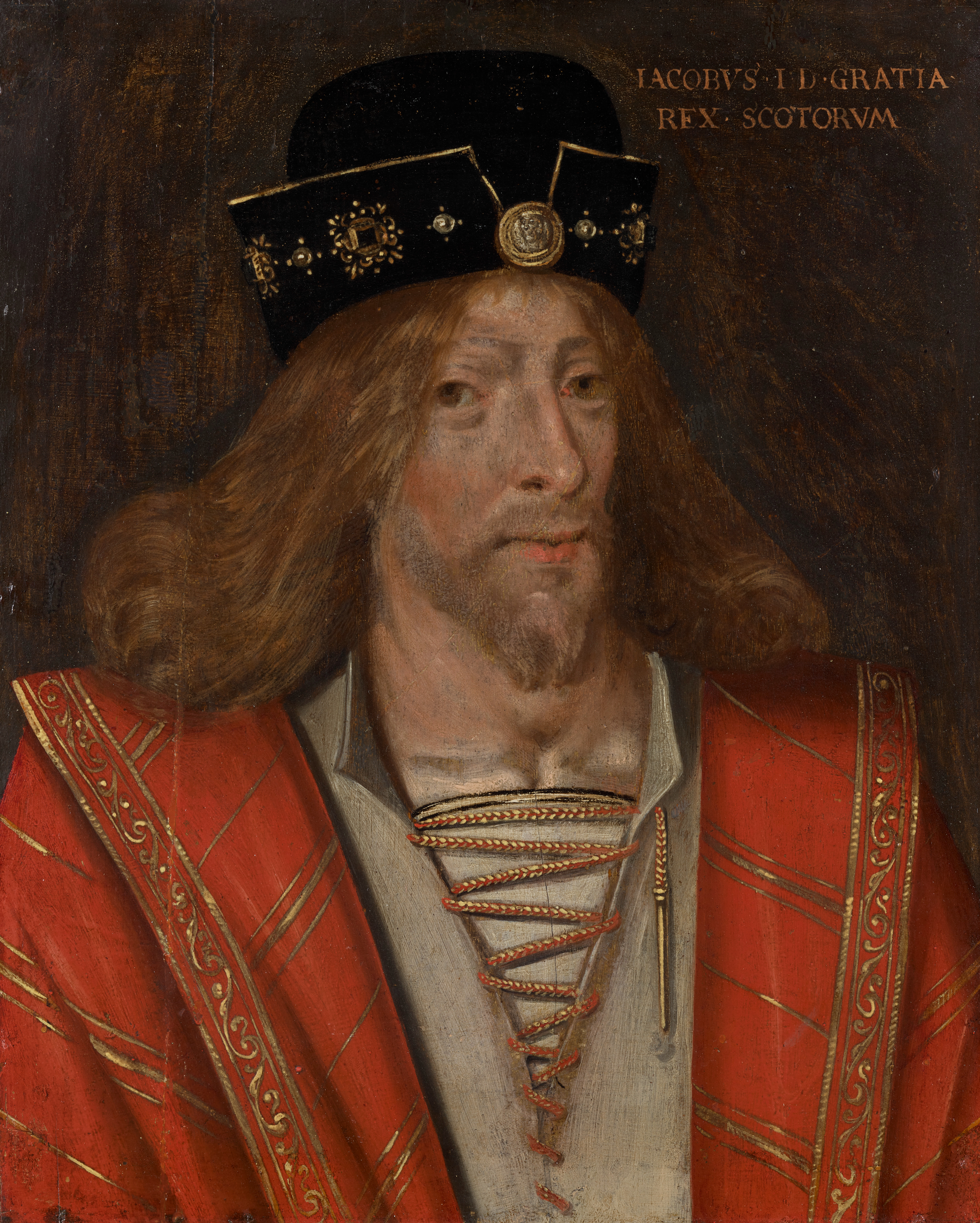
James I of Scotland

While the chronicle covers James I's reign as a king, it focuses on his murder and its aftermath in detail. James was stabbed to death, in a conspiracy led by Sir Robert Graham and the brothers Christopher and Robert Chambers, on the night of February 20–21, 1437, at Blackfriars, Perth. According to The Dethe, he was murdered while hiding in the priory's privy; it is the only 15th-century chronicle that contains this detail. The rest of the account relates how the murderers were tortured and executed.

The chronicle describes how the king hears the noise of armed men outside the door of his bedchamber; he locks the door and unsuccessfully attempts to break through the windows. With metal tongs from the fireplace he breaks open the wooden floor of the privy and finds himself in the stone passage through which the privy drains. The only way out is the hole through which the privy can be emptied, but this very hole he had ordered closed up three days before to stop his tennis balls from rolling into it. The conspirators break down the door, and one of them threatens to kill the queen, Joan Beaufort, Queen of Scots, but is stopped by a son of Sir Robert Graham. When he is discovered, two men go down but the king defeats them, though unarmed; finally Graham descends into the privy and, refusing to let the king have a confessor, stabs him through the body. Graham is overcome by emotion and kills the king, with the help of the other two men, only after being threatened by the other conspirators. They try to find and kill the queen, but she has escaped and alerted the king's retinue, which pursues the conspirators who manage to escape.

The rest of the account relates in a very detailed fashion how the murderers were tortured and executed. They are found within a month. Robert Stewart, Master of Atholl and Christopher Chambers are tortured in Edinburgh by being bound on crosses, having their flesh pulled from their bodies with tongs, being dragged by horses, hung up for all to see, decapitated with a rusty axe, and finally quartered. Their heads were displayed on a city gate. Walter Stewart, Earl of Atholl, was given a paper crown with "TRAITOUR, TRAITOUR, TRAITOUR" written on it. He was given confession; he denied being part of the assassination, though he said he knew of it. He was also beheaded, and his head, now crowned with an iron crown, was put on a pole in the centre of Edinburgh.

The torture and death of Graham in Stirling takes up six pages in the manuscript. "A mane of grete hart and manhode", he is defiant until the end and denounces his accusers. He is then hoisted onto a cart on which a tree is placed, and his hand is nailed to the tree with the very knife he used to kill the king. The executioner is ordered to cut off that hand with the same knife, and then he is drawn through the streets naked and tortured with iron instruments. He continues to defy his tormentors; they take pity on him and throw him back in jail, while more conspirators are drawn and quartered. Graham is retrieved from jail and taken to the execution site, where his son is disemboweled and beheaded before his eyes, after which he himself has his heart and then his bowels torn out.

== Audience ==
Shirley operated mostly in literary circles, perhaps an unlikely audience for the non-literary chronicle. Archibald Duncan thought it was clearly a "sadistic handbill, since it dwells so lovingly on the details of the executions of James's murderers", but Matheson identifies Richard Beauchamp, 13th Earl of Warwick, and Henry VI of England as possible recipients of BL Add. 5467 and thinks, considering the context of BL Add. 38690 and its political and historical texts, that there were more precise political purposes at play.

The possible owner of BL Add. 38690, according to Matheson, was likely a member of the Privy Council, and singles out two possibilities, both men who were active participants in the Wars of the Roses. First of all, the council's interest in MS Add. 38690 is suggested by the two texts that pertain to the release, after 25 years of captivity, of Charles, Duke of Orléans in 1440. The arguments presented for and against his release are similar to those brought up during the captivity of James I of Scotland. Matheson finds two members of the Council who may have had great interests in the documentation of those cases, as well as the two documents later in the manuscript, written in a different hand: the first a defense by Richard of York, 3rd Duke of York, for his claim to the throne (also entered in the Rolls of Parliament), the second the agreement between York and Henry VI of October 1460 that made York's descendants heirs to the English throne. These two possible owners of BL Add. 38690 are John Stourton, 1st Baron Stourton, and Richard Neville, 5th Earl of Salisbury.
