= Alan Stewart =

Alan Stewart may refer to:

- Alan Stewart, 4th Earl of Caithness (fl. 1416–1431), Scottish nobleman
- Alan Stewart (educator) (1917–2004), New Zealand educator and university administrator
- Alan Stewart (footballer) (1922–2004), English footballer
- Alan Stewart (alpine skier), British alpine skier
- Alan Carl Stewart (1893–1958), Canadian provincial and federal politician
- Alan Stewart (Australian politician) (born 1938), Australian politician
- Alan Stewart, 10th Earl of Galloway (1835–1901), British peer and politician
- Alan Stewart, 2nd High Steward of Scotland (1140–1204), Scottish crusader
- Alan Stewart of Darnley (died 1439), Scottish nobleman involved in the Hundred Years' War
- Alan Stewart of Dreghorn (died 1333), Scottish nobleman
- Al Stewart (bishop) (born 1959), Anglican bishop in Australia
- W. F. Alan Stewart (1885–1956), Canadian farmer, fox rancher and political figure
- Alan Stewart (cinematographer) (born 1960), Scottish cinematographer

== See also ==
- Al Stewart (disambiguation)
- Allan Stewart (disambiguation)
