= Sir Robert Graham =

Scottish landowner and conspirator

Sir Robert Graham of Kinpont (died 1437) was a Scottish landowner, and one of the key conspirators in the assassination of King James I of Scotland in 1437.

== Family ==
Robert Graham was the third son of Patrick Graham of Kincardine. He attended the University of Paris in the 1390s, potentially in preparation for entering the priesthood. His escutcheon is described as "On a chief indented, three escallops".

In 1399 he married Marion Oliphant, daughter of John Oliphant of Aberdalgie. Robert's brother Sir Patrick Graham (died 1413) acquired the Earldom of Strathearn through his 1406 marriage to Euphemia Stewart, Countess of Strathearn. Robert became tutor to his nephew, Malise Graham. He is described as "a grete gentilman ... a man of grete wit and eloquence, wounder suttilye willyd and expert in the lawe".

The Grahams were supporters of Robert Stewart, Duke of Albany, and his son Murdoch. When Murdoch and his two sons were executed by James I in 1425, Robert Graham was imprisoned in Dunbar Castle, but was free by 1428. Around 1425, James I deprived Malise Graham of the Earldom of Strathearn, on the pretext that he had inherited from his mother. At the time, Malise was a minor and was also being held hostage in England. Some say this action which turned Robert Graham against his King although others question such a motivation. The earldom was granted to Walter Stewart, Earl of Atholl, the uncle of James I, and Robert appears to have continued in the service of the new Earl.

Walter was next in line to the throne, and, though a distant relation, Graham's nephew – Malise – was the next in line after Walter. Walter and Robert both had further grievances against the King, and worked together to bring about his murder which was carried out by Graham.

== Assassination of James I ==
... Yitte dowte I nott but theat yee schulle see the daye and tyme that ye schulle pray for my sowle, for the grete good that I have done to yow, and to all this reume of Scotteland, that I have thus slayne and deliverde yow of so crewell a tyrant...

... Yet I do not doubt but that you shall see the day and time that you shall pray for my soul, for the great good that I have done to you, and to all in this realm of Scotland, that I have thus slain and delivered you of so cruel a tyrant...

— Sir Robert Graham

In 1436, after a disastrous military expedition to Roxburgh, Sir Robert denounced the monarch in Parliament, and attempted to arrest him. He was arrested and imprisoned, but escaped. A conspiracy was formed between Sir Robert, the Earl of Atholl, and Atholl's grandson Robert Stewart.

On the night of 20 February 1437, James was lodging in the Dominican Friary in Perth. Robert Stewart allowed the conspirators, including Sir Robert Graham and his son Thomas, into the lodging. Although the King attempted to hide in a drain, he was discovered and stabbed to death. Sir Robert is said to have dealt the fatal blow. The assassins escaped, but without killing the Queen, Joan Beaufort, who quickly assumed power as regent for the young James II. There was no wider support for the conspiracy, and the King's assassins were soon rounded up and brutally executed. Sir Robert was discovered in Perthshire and brought to Stirling, where he was executed in April.

In 17th-century litigation surrounding the Earl of Airth and his claim on the Earldom of Strathearn, it was argued by the Crown that to recognise the Earl of Airth's claim would be a justification of Sir Robert Graham's murder of the King. However, more recent historians have doubted that the deprivation of Malise Graham was such a strong motivation for Sir Robert's actions.
