= Al Stewart (disambiguation) =

Al Stewart (born 1945) is a Scottish-born English singer-songwriter and musician.

Al Stewart may also refer to:

- Alastair Stewart (born 1952), English journalist and newscaster
- Al Stewart (bishop) (born 1959), Australian bishop
- Al Stewart (basketball) (born 1983), American basketball player
- Al Stewart (U.S. government official), U.S. Department of Labor official

== See also ==
- Alan Stewart (disambiguation)
- Albert Stewart (disambiguation)
- Alf Stewart
