= Albert Stewart =

Albert Stewart may refer to:

- Albert Stewart (sculptor) (1900–1965), American sculptor
- Albert Stewart (rugby union) (1889–1917), Irish rugby union player and British Army officer
- Albert Oliphant Stewart (1884–1958), New Zealand tribal leader, law clerk, interpreter and local politician
- Albert Pearson Stewart (1907–1991), American music conductor and director
- A. J. H. Stewart (1860–1917), Canadian politician

== See also ==
- Al Stewart (disambiguation)
