= Walter Stewart, Earl of Atholl =

14th and 15th-century Scottish nobleman

Arms of Walter Stewart after 1430

Walter Stewart, Earl of Atholl, Strathearn and Caithness (c. 1360 – 26 March 1437) was a Scottish nobleman, the son of Robert II of Scotland. Stewart advocated for the ransom and return to Scotland of the future king in exile, James I, in 1424. In 1425 he served as a member of the jury of 21 which tried and executed his nephew Murdoch Stewart, 2nd Duke of Albany. Eventually, however, Atholl turned against the King and conspired in his assassination in 1437. He was tried for murder and was executed after three days of torture.

== Early life ==
Stewart was a son of Robert II of Scotland by his second wife Euphemia de Ross, daughter of Aodh, Earl of Ross. He was also a younger half-brother of Robert III of Scotland and an uncle of the above-mentioned James I of Scotland.

Stewart married first, sometime before 1378, Margaret Barclay, Lady of Brechin, by whom he had two sons:

- David Stewart, Master of Atholl (d. bef. 1437)
- Alan Stewart, 4th Earl of Caithness (d. 1431)

In 1390, Stewart's niece Euphemia resigned to him the Earldom of Caithness. In 1404, he was created Earl of Atholl.

== Ransom and return of James I of Scotland ==
Stewart was energetic in retrieving his nephew James I from the Kingdom of England, which was accomplished in 1424, and was a member of the jury which tried his half nephew, Murdoch Stewart, 2nd Duke of Albany, and culminated in the execution of Albany and two of his sons.

Stewart was made Great Justiciar of Scotland and Earl of Strathearn, with such title being taken from Malise Graham, who subsequently became the Earl of Menteith in 1427. He resigned Caithness to his son Alan in 1428 but regained it on Alan's death without issue in 1431.

The depth of Stewart's loyalties to James is unclear. The chronicler Buchanan (1582) saw in his efforts to return James to Scotland and support him against Albany and his children a deep-laid plan for those two branches of the House of Stewart to destroy each other – and clear his own way to the throne, reviving the old charge of illegitimacy against his half-brother Robert III. Others aver that it was the imprisonment and subsequent death of his son David that turned him against the king.

== Assassination of James I ==
Whatever the cause of Stewart's rage against the King, he joined with his grandson Robert Stewart, Master of Atholl, and Sir Robert Graham in a conspiracy against James I, which resulted in the assassination of the king on 20 February 1437. Robert Stewart unbarred the doors to the royal apartments, permitting assassins to enter the King's lodging at the Dominican Blackfriars in Perth. The King hid under the floorboards, only to be discovered by Sir Robert Graham, who personally murdered the monarch.

=== Execution of Walter Stewart ===
Stewart had little popular support for his cause, and the conspirators were swiftly apprehended. They were attainted and put to death in Edinburgh by a series of tortures remarkable and hideous even for that era. He was tortured over a period of three days.

On the first day – he was put in a cart with a crane, hoist up, dropped, and jerked violently to stretch his joints. He was then placed in a pillory and "crowned with a diadem of burning iron" bearing the inscription "King of all Traitors".

On the second day – he was bound to a hurdle and dragged along the high street of Edinburgh (some claim he was also blinded and tortured with red-hot iron pincers on this day, but Buchanan speaks only of the hurdle).

On the third and final day – he was disembowelled while alive, his entrails burnt before his face, and his heart was torn out and burnt. Finally, his corpse was beheaded and quartered, and the quarters displayed around the realm.

== Notes ==
Peerage of Scotland
Vacant Grant expired Title last held by Robert Stewart	Earl of Atholl; 1404– 1437	Vacant Forfeit Title next held by John Stewart
Preceded by Euphemia Stewart	Earl of Caithness; 1390– c. 1428	Succeeded by Alan Stewart
Preceded by Malise Graham	Earl of Strathearn; 1427– c. 1437	Vacant Forfeit Title next held by William
Preceded by Alan Stewart	Earl of Caithness; 1431– c. 1437	Vacant Forfeit Title next held by George Crichton
