= Joseph Stevenson =

British archivist

Joseph Stevenson (27 November 1806 – 8 February 1895) was an English Church of England and later Catholic priest, archivist and editor of historical texts.

== Early life ==
Joseph Stevenson was born on 27 November 1806 in Berwick-on-Tweed, the eldest son of Robert Stevenson, surgeon, and his wife, Elizabeth née Wilson. His parents were Presbyterians. Growing up, he occasionally accompanied an uncle on smuggling expeditions across the border. He was educated first at Witton-le-Wear (County Durham), and then at Durham School, under James Raine; where he was usually near the bottom of his class and at one time kept a loaded pistol among his effects which went off in the hands of a servant with dramatic although not deadly consequences. Afterwards he studied Latin and Greek at the University of Glasgow but made little progress and eventually returned to Berwick to pursue a vocation with the Church of Scotland.

== Career ==
Moving to London, Stevenson found work in 1831 at the British Museum, which had just acquired the Arundel collection and needed competent assistants to sort and classify. He briefly went to Glasgow to claim a bride, Mary Ann, daughter of John Craig of Mount Florida, whom he married that September. A son, Robert, was born in August 1832; two daughters came later. From this time Stevenson established contact with many notable British historians including Patrick Fraser Tytler, and joined various learned societies. In 1834 he was appointed a subcommissioner of the public records and began work on a proposed new edition of Thomas Rymer's Foedera. While in London he transferred his allegiance from the kirk to the Church of England, in which Robert and the two daughters were baptized.

=== Return to Durham ===
The death of his son Robert in 1839 prompted him to reconsider his life. He resigned from the record commission and went to Durham to enter the city's university and study Theology, completing his licentiate in Easter 1841, with one of his classmates being the future antiquarian George Ornsby. He became librarian at Durham Cathedral. He spent the next seven years cataloging the charters and deeds in the treasury. During this time he was close to the cleric and author George Townsend, who would later travel to Rome on an unsuccessful mission to convert Pope Pius IX to Protestantism. Townsend appointed Stevenson as curate at St Margaret's Church.

All this time he was constantly editing ancient texts: for the Maitland Club, Glasgow, eight volumes (1833–42) (including The Life and Death of King James the First of Scotland (1837), which contains the text of The Dethe of the Kynge of Scotis); for the English Historical Society, five volumes (1838–41); for the Roxburghe Club, four volumes; for the Surtees Society, seven volumes, with eight volumes of The Church Historians of England.

=== Archivist to the British Government ===
In 1849 he became Vicar of Leighton Buzzard in Bedfordshire, where he would remain until 1862. By contrast with his comfortable Durham living, here he had to manage on £120 per annum, and to live in a vicarage so decayed as to be uninhabitable. He stayed until 1862, somehow finding the money to fund a curate, rebuild the vicarage, and restore the church after it was struck by lightning. 1856 the British Government was making plans for dealing with the national records on a large scale. Stevenson was one of those appointed to report on the subject, and when the new Public Record Office was opened in 1857, he was one of the first editors engaged. He now edited seven volumes for the Rolls Series, seven volumes of Calendars, Foreign Series, and two of the Scottish Series. Ironically, given his later conversion to the Catholic faith, one of his predecessors at the Office, William Barclay Turnbull, had been pressured to resign because of his own Catholicism.

=== Conversion to Catholicism ===
He converted to Catholicism on 24 June 1863, and following the death of his wife in 1869 he entered the seminary of St Mary's College, Oscott, and in 1872 was ordained priest by Bishop Ullathorne. Next year he was in Rome searching for documents concerning English history from the Vatican archives, being employed by the British Government to begin the series of "Roman Transcripts" for the Record Office - his status as a Catholic allowing him this privileged access. He also wrote many reports for the Historical Manuscripts Commission.

In 1877, aged nearly 72, he gave up these occupations to enter the Society of Jesus. However, after his novitiate he returned again to historical research, and continued his studies until his death. His chief work of this period was the discovery and publication of Claude Nau's Life of Mary Queen of Scots (Edinburgh, 1883). In 1892 he received the honorary degree of Doctor of Laws from the University of St Andrews.

== Death ==
Stevenson died in London on 8 February 1895 at the House of the Society of Jesus on Mount Street.

== Selected published works ==
- Narratives of the Expulsion of the English from Normandy, (1863)
