= Allan Stewart =

Allan Stewart may refer to:

- Allan Stewart (artist) (1865–1951), painter of military scenes and battles
- Allan Stewart (comedian) (born 1950), British comic and impressionist
- Allan Stewart (footballer), Scottish international footballer, 1888–1889
- Allan Stewart (ice hockey) (born 1964), retired National Hockey League left winger
- Allan Breck Stewart, legendary Jacobite in "the Appin murder" who inspired both Walter Scott and Robert Louis Stevenson
- Allan Stewart (musician) (born 1977), guitarist in the bands Idlewild and DeSalvo
- Allan Stewart (politician) (1942−2016), Conservative Party Scottish politician
- Allan Stewart (rugby union) (born 1940), New Zealand rugby union player
- Allan Stewart, commendator of Crossraguel Abbey, tortured by Gilbert Kennedy, 4th Earl of Cassilis
- C. Allan Stewart (1907–1973), US ambassador to Venezuela

== See also ==
- Alan Stewart (disambiguation)
