= John Pinkerton =

Scottish antiquarian

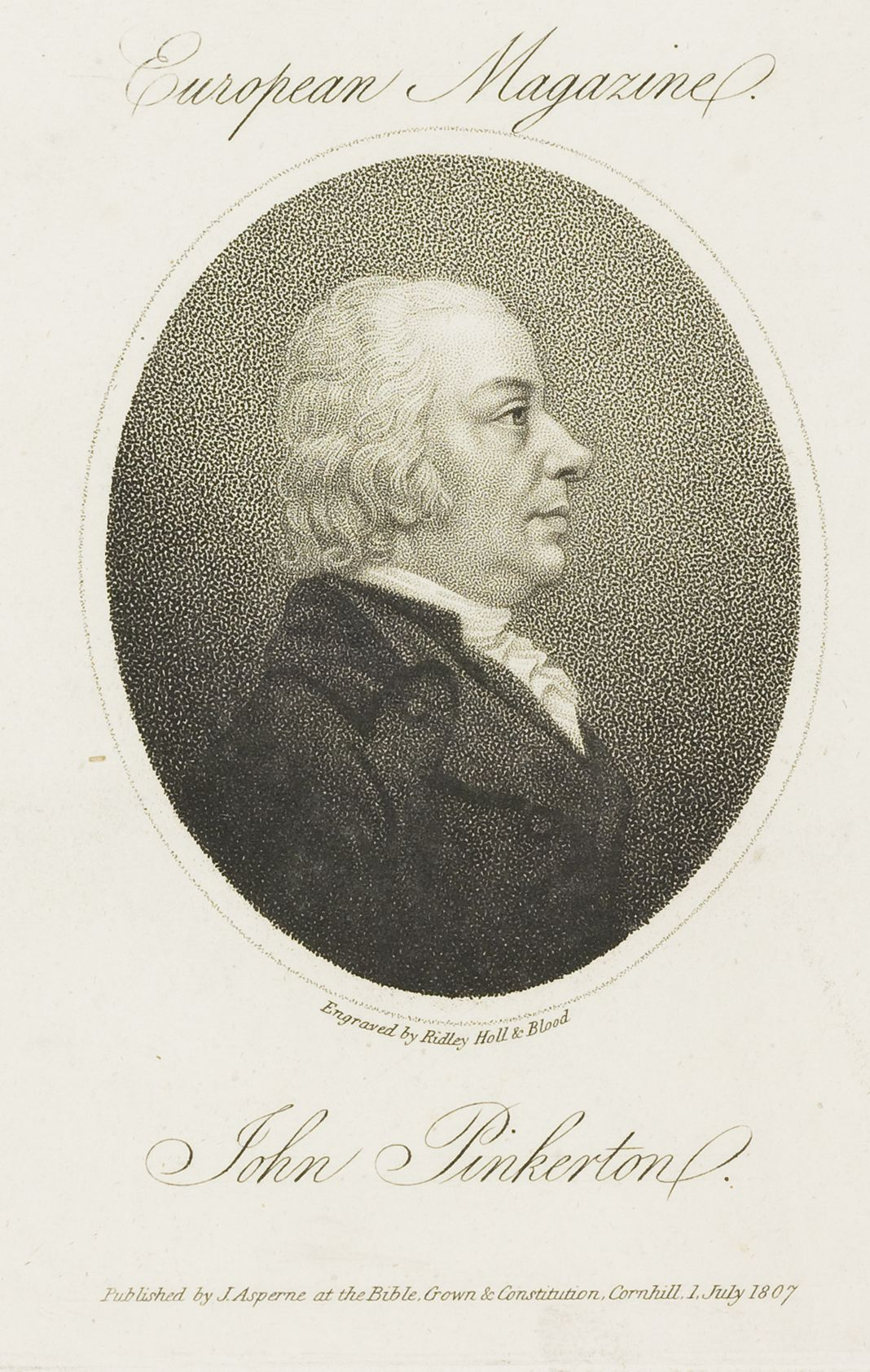
John Pinkerton

John Pinkerton (17 February 1758 – 10 March 1826) was a Scottish antiquarian, cartographer, author, numismatist, historian, and early advocate of Germanic racial supremacy theory.

He was born in Edinburgh, as one of three sons to James Pinkerton and Mary (nee Heron or Bowie) Pinkerton. He lived in the neighbourhood of that city for some of his earliest childhood years, but later moved to Lanark. His studious youth brought him extensive knowledge of the Classics, and it is known that in his childhood years he enjoyed translating Roman authors such as Livy. He moved on to Edinburgh University, and after graduating, remained in the city to take up an apprenticeship in Law. However, his scholarly inclinations led him to abandon the legal profession after he began writing Elegy on Craigmillar Castle, first published in 1776.

== London and publications ==
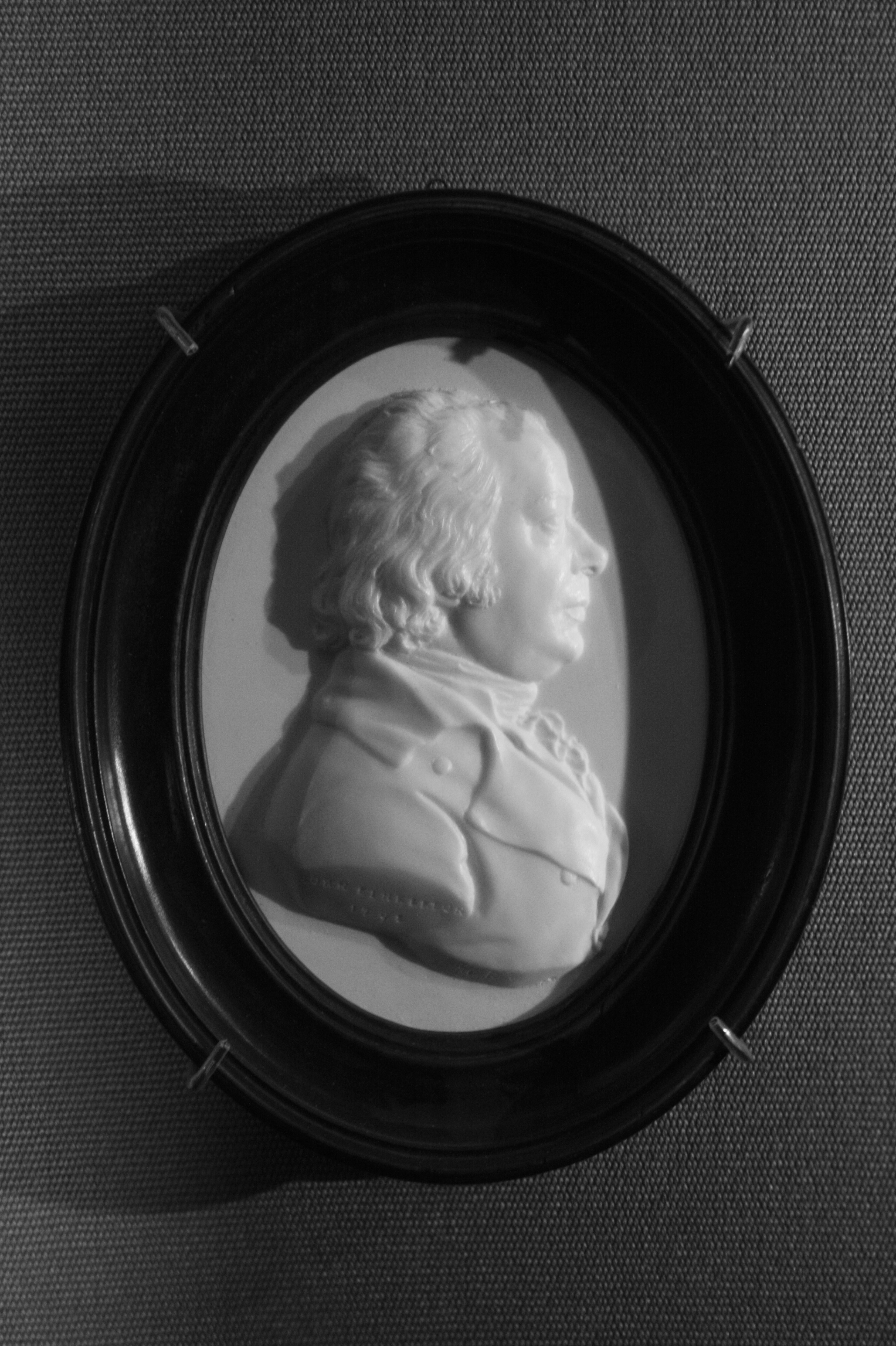
Cameo of John Pinkerton

In 1781, Pinkerton moved to London, where his full career as a writer began in earnest, publishing in the same year a volume of Rimes of no great merit, and Scottish Tragic Ballads. These were followed in 1782 by Two Dithyrambic Odes on Enthusiasm and Laughter, and by a series of Tales in Verse. Under the title of Select Scottish Ballads he reprinted in 1783 his tragic ballads, with a supplement comprising Ballads of the Comic Kind. Joseph Ritson pointed out in 1784 that the so-called ancient ballads were some of them of modern date, and Pinkerton admitted that he was the author of the second part of Hardy Kanute and part-author of some others. He published an Essay on Medals in 1784, and in 1785, under the pseudonym of "Robert Heron", his bold but eccentric Letters of Literature depreciating the classical authors of Greece and Rome. In 1786 he edited Ancient Scottish Poems from the manuscript collections of Sir Richard Maitland of Lethington. It was succeeded in 1787 by a compilation, under the new pseudonym of "H. Bennet" entitled The Treasury of Wit, and by his first important historical work, the Dissertation on the Origin and Progress of the Scythians or Goths, to which Gibbon acknowledged himself indebted.

His edition of Barbour's Bruce and a Medallic History of England to the Revolution appeared in 1790; a collection of Scottish poems reprinted from scarce editions in 1792; and a series of biographical sketches, the Iconographia scotica, in the years 1795 to 1797. In 1797 he published a History of Scotland from the Accession of the House of Stuart to that of Mary (which includes an edition of The Dethe of the Kynge of Scotis). A new biographical collection, the Gallery of Eminent Persons of Scotland (1799), was succeeded after a short interval by a Modern Geography digested on a New Plan (1802; enlarged 1807).

== Celtic/Gothic furore ==
Pinkerton next collected and printed in 1789 certain Vitae sanctorum scotiae, and, a little later, published his Enquiry into the History of Scotland preceding the Reign of Malcolm III. His assertion that the Celts were incapable of assimilating the highest forms of civilisation excited "violent disgust", but the Enquiry was twice reprinted, in 1794 and 1814, and is still of value for the documents embodied in it.

Pinkerton very much wished to purge his country's history of all Celtic elements. In this aim, through two works, the Dissertation on the Origins and Progress of the Scythians or Goths (1787) and the Enquiry into the History of Scotland preceding the reign of Malcolm III (1789), he developed the theory that the Picts were in fact of the race of ancient Goths, that the Scots language was a pure descendant of the Picto-Gothic language; and, moreover, that the Gaels, or Highlanders, were a degenerate impostor race.

In an effort to advance his theories, Pinkerton turned to comparing Celtic and Germanic philology. He wanted to show that Scotland's Celtic placenames were not Celtic at all—many of these attempts being discredited by modern scholars. Pinkerton thought, for instance, that Aber (as in Aberdeen) came from the German über rather than from the Celtic for confluence of a river, and likewise, that the Gaelic word Inver (equivalent of Aber) was a borrowing from Danish.

To this end he set his energy to collecting and creating older Anglo-Scottish literature. This was all the more important as far as his agenda was concerned because of the "Celtomania" produced by the Ossian poems of James Macpherson. Many such works had been invented by Pinkerton. His "ancient" Anglo-Scottish tale of Hardyknute had in fact only been composed in 1719 by Lady Wardlaw of Pitreavie. Pinkerton subsequently invented a sequel to this epic, but after he was exposed by Joseph Ritson, he admitted to the forgery.

Pinkerton's correspondence with fellow academics is characterised by verbal abuse. Hugh Trevor-Roper, one modern historian inclined to sympathise with at least the spirit of his views, called him "eccentric." Other historians have hinted at mild insanity. Despite this, Pinkerton is still an important figure in the history of British antiquarianism.

== Cartography ==
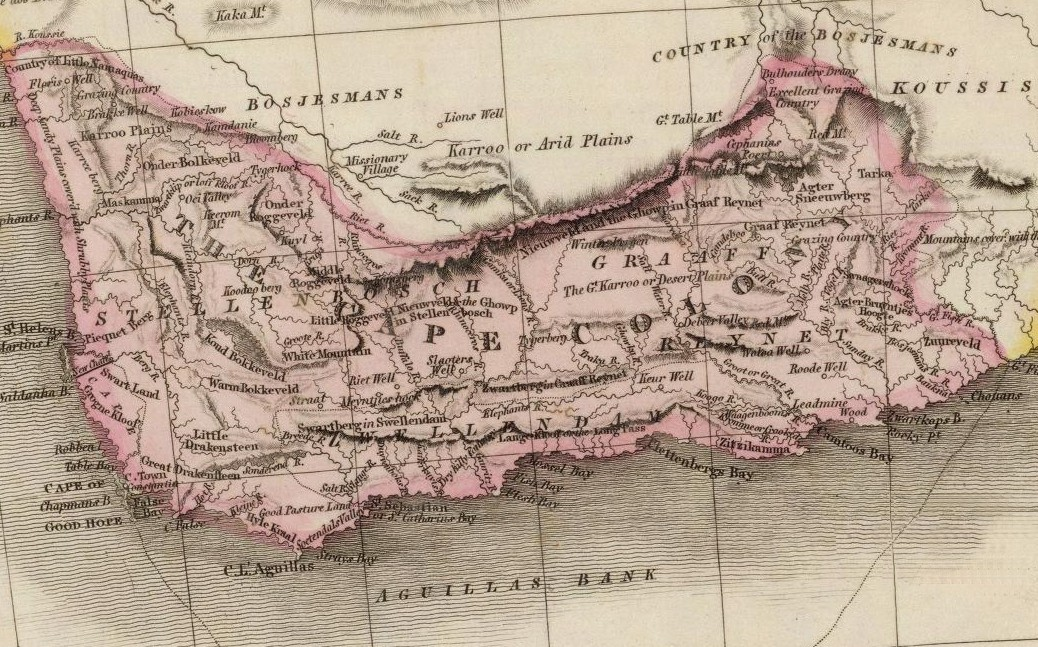
1809 Cape Colony map by John Pinkerton

Pinkerton was a celebrated master of the Edinburgh school of cartography which lasted from roughly 1800 to 1830. Pinkerton, along with John Thomson & Co. and John Cary, redefined cartography by exchanging the elaborate cartouches and fantastical beasts used in the 18th century for more accurate detail. Pinkerton's main work was the "Pinkerton's Modern Atlas" published from 1808 through 1815 with an American version by Dobson & Co. in 1818. Pinkerton maps are today greatly valued for their quality, size, colouration, and detail.

== Later life ==
Some of Pinkerton's collection of books and maps was sold at auction in London, by Leigh & Sotheby, on 7 January 1813 (and 6 following days); a copy of the catalogue is held at Cambridge University Library (shelfmark Munby.c.159(1)). About 1818 he left London for Paris, where he made his headquarters until his death on 10 March 1826. He spent his later years impoverished. His remaining publications were the Recollections of Paris in the years 1802–5 (1806); a very useful General Collection of Voyages and Travels (1808–1814); a New Modern Atlas (1808–1819); and his Petralogy (1811).

== Reading ==
- Ferguson, William, The Identity of the Scottish Nation: An Historic Quest, (Edinburgh, 1998), pp. 250–273.
- Patrick O'Flaherty: Scotland's pariah : the life and work of John Pinkerton, 1758 - 1826, Toronto [u.a.] : Univ. of Toronto Press, 2015, ISBN 978-1-4426-4928-6
- Couper, Sarah. "Pinkerton, John (1758–1826)". Oxford Dictionary of National Biography (online ed.). Oxford University Press. doi:10.1093/ref:odnb/22301. (Subscription, Wikipedia Library access or UK public library membership required.)
