= Alan Stewart, 4th Earl of Caithness =

15th-century Scottish nobleman

Alan Stewart
- Earl of Caithness
- Born: c. 1401?
- Died: September 1431; Inverlochy, Scotland
- Noble family: Stewart
- Father: Walter Stewart, Earl of Atholl

Alan Stewart (fl. 1416-1431) was a Scottish nobleman. A grandson of Robert II of Scotland, he held the title of Earl of Caithness from 1430 until his death at the Battle of Inverlochy the following year.

== Life ==
Alan was the younger son of Walter Stewart, Earl of Atholl, himself the youngest son of Robert II of Scotland. The identity of his mother is uncertain. Alan may have been the illegitimate son of the Earl of Atholl mentioned as prebend of Menmuir in 1416. The same Alan was described in 1418 as a student at the University of St Andrews, when he was at least seventeen years old.

Alan's elder brother, David, was sent to England in 1424 as a hostage for the ransom of James I of Scotland. By March 1430, Alan had assumed the title of Earl of Caithness, which his father had resigned to him. He formally received the earldom two months later. Alan's elevation to an earldom provided his cousin, Alexander Stewart, Earl of Mar, with a deputy of equal rank to command his upcoming military expedition against Clan Donald. Alan held command in the royal army during the campaign of 1431, alongside Alexander Seton of Gordon and other noblemen.

The royal campaign of 1431, directed against Alasdair Carrach and other members of Clan Donald, culminated in the Battle of Inverlochy, fought near Inverlochy Castle in September 1431. The royal army was surprised by Carrach's smaller force and disintegrated under intense arrow fire. Alan was killed towards the end of the battle, dying alongside sixteen men-at-arms of his household retinue.

It is unknown if Alan married or left issue. Alan's father, Walter, Earl of Atholl, recovered the earldom of Caithness upon his death.
