= Robert Stewart, Master of Atholl =

Robert Stewart, Master of Atholl was a Scottish nobleman. He was the son of David Stewart, grandson of Walter Stewart, 1st Earl of Atholl, and the great-grandson of Robert II of Scotland. He was executed, along with his grandfather and other Scottish noblemen on 26 March 1437, for his role in the murder of James I of Scotland.
