= Steve Boardman (historian) =

20th-century Scottish medieval historian

Stephen I. Boardman, FRHistS, is a Scottish medieval historian. A graduate of the University of St Andrews, he held the Glenfiddich Research Fellowship and a Post-Doctoral Fellowship of the British Academy at St Andrews before being appointed Mackie Lecturer in History at the University of Aberdeen in 1995. He subsequently moved to the University of Edinburgh, where he is now Professor of Medieval Scottish History. Boardman's work focuses on kingship and the nobility in the later Middle Ages, and he has completed work on Scottish kings Robert II and Robert III, as well as Clan Campbell. The former is the only work to deal specifically with those monarchs.

== Select bibliography ==
- The Early Stewart Kings: Robert II and Robert III, 1371-1406. Tuckwell Press. 1996
- Editor. The Exercise of Power in Scotland, 1250-1500. Four Courts Press. 2003
- 'Survival and revival: late medieval Scotland' – J. Wormald (editor), The Oxford Illustrated History of Scotland. Oxford University Press. 2005
- The Campbells, 1250-1500. Birlinn Press. 2005
- 'The Gaelic world and the early Stewart court' – D. Broun and M. MacGregor (editors), Miorun Mor nan Gall, The Great Ill-Will of the Lowlander: Lowland Perceptions of the Scottish Highlands. Stornoway. 2006
