= James I of Scotland =

King of Scots from 1406 to 1437

James I
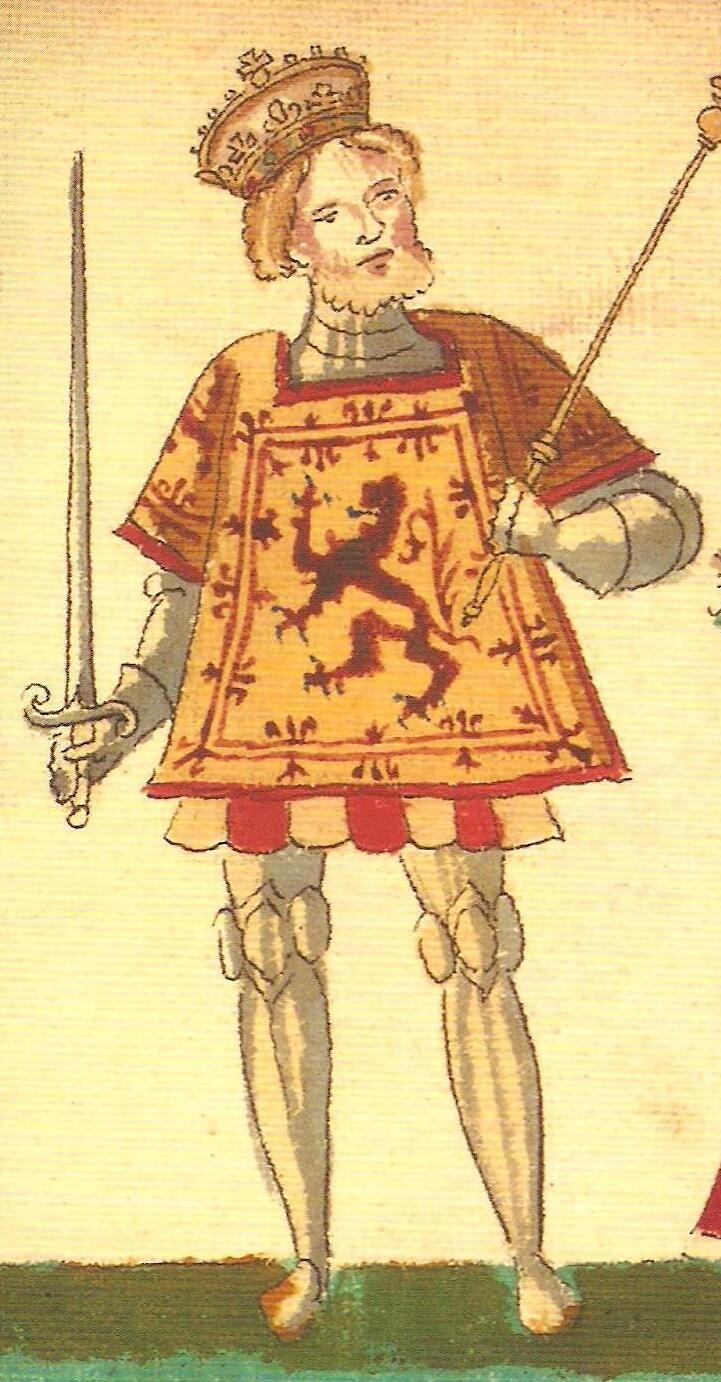
- Portrait in the Forman Armorial, 1562

King of Scots
- Reign: 4 April 1406 – 21 February 1437
- Coronation: 21 May 1424
- Predecessor: Robert III
- Successor: James II
- Born: possibly 25 July 1394; Dunfermline Abbey, Fife
- Died: 21 February 1437 (aged around 42); Blackfriars, Perth
- Burial: Perth Charterhouse
- Spouse: Joan Beaufort (m. 1424)
- Issue: Margaret, Dauphine of France; Isabella, Duchess of Brittany; Eleanor, Archduchess of Austria; Mary, Countess of Buchan; Joan, Countess of Morton; Alexander, Duke of Rothesay; James II, King of Scots; Annabella, Countess of Huntly
- House: Stewart
- Father: Robert III of Scotland
- Mother: Annabella Drummond
- Religion: Roman Catholic
- Events: 1405–1406 During winter, decision made to send James to France for safe-keeping 1406 Fled Scotland for France around the middle of March 1406 but captured at sea on 22 March and taken prisoner of the English King Henry IV 1406–1413 Provided with good education by Henry IV 1413–1415 Henry IV died on 20 March 1413. Henry V had different attitude towards James and regarded him as a prisoner and held him at the Tower of London and at Windsor Castle 1420–1422 By this time, Henry now regarded James as a guest at court and took him on campaigns to France until Henry's death 1423 In August the council agreed that negotiations between Scotland and England should begin for James's release 1424 James married Joan Beaufort in February; released from captivity and is crowned at Scone Abbey, 21 May 1425 James destroyed his near relatives, the Albany Stewarts, and forfeited their lands 1425–1427 James got Parliament's agreement to restrict the influence of the Church and the prelacy 1428–1431 James attempted to bring the Lordship of the Isles under direct control of the Crown by force failed 1429 By this time, James had stopped all ransom payments 1436 James led an unsuccessful attack against the English enclave at Roxburgh Castle which drew much criticism 1437 James murdered in his chambers in the Greyfriars monastery in Perth by men acting for his uncle, Walter, Earl of Atholl, on 20 February. Atholl arrested, tried and executed on 26 March

James I (late July 1394 – 21 February 1437) was King of Scots from 1406 to 1437. The youngest of three sons, he was born in Dunfermline Abbey to King Robert III and his wife Annabella Drummond. His older brother David, Duke of Rothesay died under suspicious circumstances while being detained by their uncle, Robert, Duke of Albany. His other brother, Robert, died young. Fears for James's safety grew through the winter of 1405/6 and plans were made to send him to France. In February 1406, James was forced to take refuge in the castle of the Bass Rock in the Firth of Forth after his escort was attacked by supporters of Archibald, 4th Earl of Douglas. He remained there until mid-March, when he boarded a vessel bound for France. On 22 March, English pirates captured the ship and delivered the prince to Henry IV of England. The ailing Robert III died on 4 April, and the 11-year-old James, now the uncrowned King of Scotland, would not regain his freedom for another eighteen years.

James had a good education at the English Court, where he developed a respect for English methods of governance and for Henry V. The Scottish king, apparently willingly, joined Henry in his military campaign in France during 1420 and 1421. His cousin, Murdoch Stewart, Albany's son, had been an English prisoner since 1402 and was traded for Henry Percy, 2nd Earl of Northumberland in 1416. James had married Joan Beaufort, daughter of the Earl of Somerset, in February 1424, just before his release in April. The king's re-entry into Scottish affairs was not altogether popular since he had fought on behalf of Henry V in France and at times against Scottish forces. Noble families were now faced with paying increased taxes to cover the ransom repayments, but would also have to provide family hostages as security. James excelled in sports and appreciated literature and music; he also held a strong desire to impose law and order on his subjects, although he applied it selectively at times.

To secure his position, James launched pre-emptive attacks on some of his nobles beginning in 1425 with his close kinsmen, the Albany Stewarts, resulting in the execution of Duke Murdoch and his sons. In 1428, James detained Alexander, Lord of the Isles, while attending a parliament in Inverness. Archibald, 5th Earl of Douglas, was arrested in 1431, followed by George, Earl of March, in 1434. The plight of the ransom hostages held in England was ignored, and the repayment money was diverted into the construction of Linlithgow Palace and other grandiose schemes. In August 1436, James failed in his siege of the English-held Roxburgh Castle and then faced an ineffective attempt by Sir Robert Graham to arrest him at a general council. James was assassinated at Perth on the night of 20/21 February 1437 in a failed coup by his uncle Walter Stewart, Earl of Atholl. Queen Joan, although wounded, managed to evade the attackers and reached her son, now King James II, in Edinburgh Castle.

== Prince and Steward of Scotland ==
James was probably born in late July 1394 at Dunfermline Abbey, 27 years after the marriage of his parents, Robert III and Annabella Drummond. It was also at Dunfermline under his mother's care that James would have spent most of his early childhood. The prince was seven years old when his mother died in 1401. A year later, his elder brother David, Duke of Rothesay was probably murdered by their uncle Robert Stewart, Duke of Albany, after being held at Albany's Falkland Castle. Prince James, now heir to the throne, represented the only remaining obstacle to the succession passing to the Albany Stewarts. In 1402, Albany and his close ally Archibald, 4th Earl of Douglas were exonerated of any involvement in Rothesay's death, clearing the way for Albany's re-appointment as the king's lieutenant.

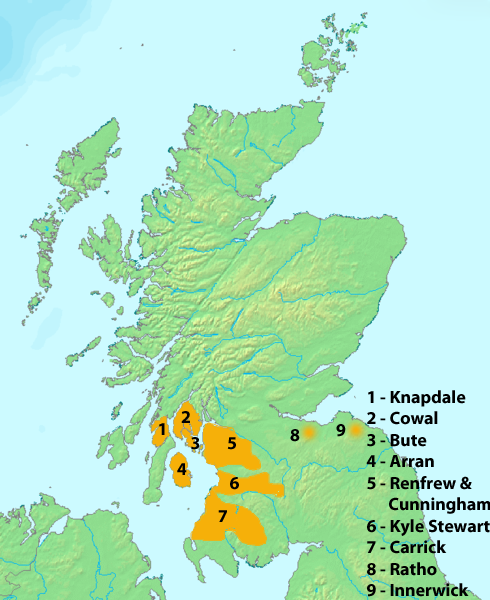
The lands held in regality by Prince James

Albany rewarded Douglas for his support by allowing him to resume hostilities in England. The Albany and Douglas affinity received a serious reversal in September 1402 when their large army was defeated by that of the English at Homildon, when numerous prominent nobles and their followers were captured. These included Douglas himself, Albany's son Murdoch, and the earls of Moray, Angus and Orkney. That same year, as well as Rothsay's death, Alexander Leslie, Earl of Ross and Malcolm Drummond, lord of Mar had also died. The void created by these events was inevitably filled by lesser men who had not previously been conspicuously politically active. In the years between 1402 and 1406, the northern earldoms of Ross, Moray and Mar were without adult leadership and with Murdoch Stewart, the justiciar for the territory north of the Forth, a prisoner in England, Albany found himself reluctantly having to form an alliance with his brother Alexander Stewart, Earl of Buchan and Buchan's son, also called Alexander to hold back the ambitions of the Lord of the Isles. Douglas's absence from his power base in the Lothians and the Scottish Marches encouraged King Robert's close allies Henry Sinclair, Earl of Orkney and Sir David Fleming of Biggar to take full advantage in becoming the principal political force in that region.

In December 1404, the king granted the royal Stewart lands in the west, in Ayrshire and around the Firth of Clyde, to James in regality, protecting them from outside interference and providing the prince with a territorial centre should the need arise. Yet, in 1405 James was under the protection and tutelage of Bishop Henry Wardlaw of St Andrews on the country's east coast. Douglas' animosity was intensifying because of the activities of Orkney and Fleming who continued to expand their involvement in border politics and foreign relations with England. Although a decision to send the young prince to France and out of Albany's reach was taken in the winter of 1405–06, James's departure from Scotland was unplanned. In February 1406, Bishop Wardlaw released James to Orkney and Fleming who, with their large force of Lothian adherents, proceeded into hostile Douglas east Lothian. James's custodians may have been seeking to demonstrate royal approval to further their interests in the Douglas country. This provoked a fierce response from James Douglas of Balvenie and his supporters, who, at a place called Long Hermiston Muir, engaged with and killed Fleming. At the same time, Orkney and James escaped to the comparative safety of the Bass Rock islet in the Firth of Forth. They endured more than a month there before boarding the France-bound Maryenknyght, a ship from Danzig. On 22 March 1406 the ship was seized, in an act of piracy, by an English vessel part-owned by the MP and royal official Hugh Fenn that resulted in James becoming the hostage of King Henry IV of England. Robert III was at Rothesay Castle when he learned of his son's capture, and he died soon after on 4 April 1406 and was buried in the Stewart foundation abbey of Paisley.

== King in captivity ==
James, now the uncrowned King of Scots, began an eighteen‑year captivity, while Albany simultaneously moved from his position as lieutenant to that of governor. Albany took James's lands under his own control, depriving the king of income and any of the regalia of his position and was referred to in records as 'the son of the late king'. The king had a small household of Scots that included Henry Sinclair, Earl of Orkney, Alexander Seaton, the nephew of Sir David Fleming, and Orkney's brother John Sinclair following the earl's return to Scotland. In time, James's household—now paid for by the English—changed from high-ranking individuals to less notable men. While denying James the respect or status due an uncrowned king, Henry IV treated the young James fairly well, providing him with a good education.

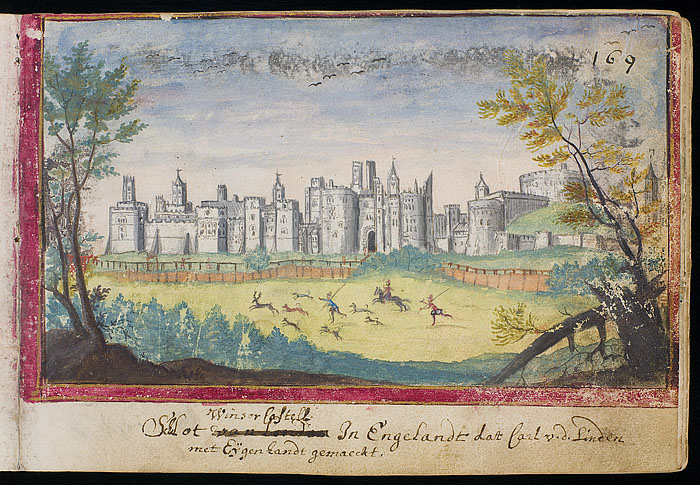
Windsor Castle, where James I was held prisoner. Drawing from the Album amicorum ('Friendship album') of Michael van Meer. Edinburgh University Library

James was ideally placed to observe Henry's methods of kingship and political control having probably been admitted into the royal household on reaching adulthood. James used personal visits from his nobles coupled with letters to individuals to maintain his visibility in his kingdom. Henry died in 1413 and his son, Henry V, immediately ended James's comparative freedom initially holding him in the Tower of London along with the other Scottish prisoners. One of these prisoners was James's cousin, Murdoch Stewart, Albany's son, who had been captured in 1402 at the Battle of Homildon Hill. Initially held apart, but from 1413 until Murdoch's release in 1415, they were together in the Tower and at Windsor Castle.

By 1420, James's standing at Henry V's court had greatly improved; he ceased to be regarded as a hostage and became more of a guest, a guest who was also a prisoner not free to leave. James's value to Henry became apparent in 1420 when he forced to accompany the English king to France, where his presence was used against the Scots fighting on the Dauphinist side. Following the English success at the siege of Melun, a town southeast of Paris, the contingent of Scots was hanged for treason against their king. James attended Catherine of Valois's coronation on 23 February 1421 and was honoured by being seated immediately to the queen's left at the coronation banquet. In March, Henry began a circuit of the important towns in England in a show of strength and, during this tour, James was knighted on Saint George's Day. By July, the two kings were back campaigning in France, where James, evidently approving of Henry's methods of kingship, seemed content to endorse the English king's desire for the French crown, although it is not clear how as a prisoner he could have objected. Henry appointed the Duke of Bedford and James as the joint commanders of the siege of Dreux on 18 July 1421, and on 20 August they received the surrender of the garrison. Henry died of dysentery on 31 August 1422 and in September James was part of the escort taking the English king's body back to London.

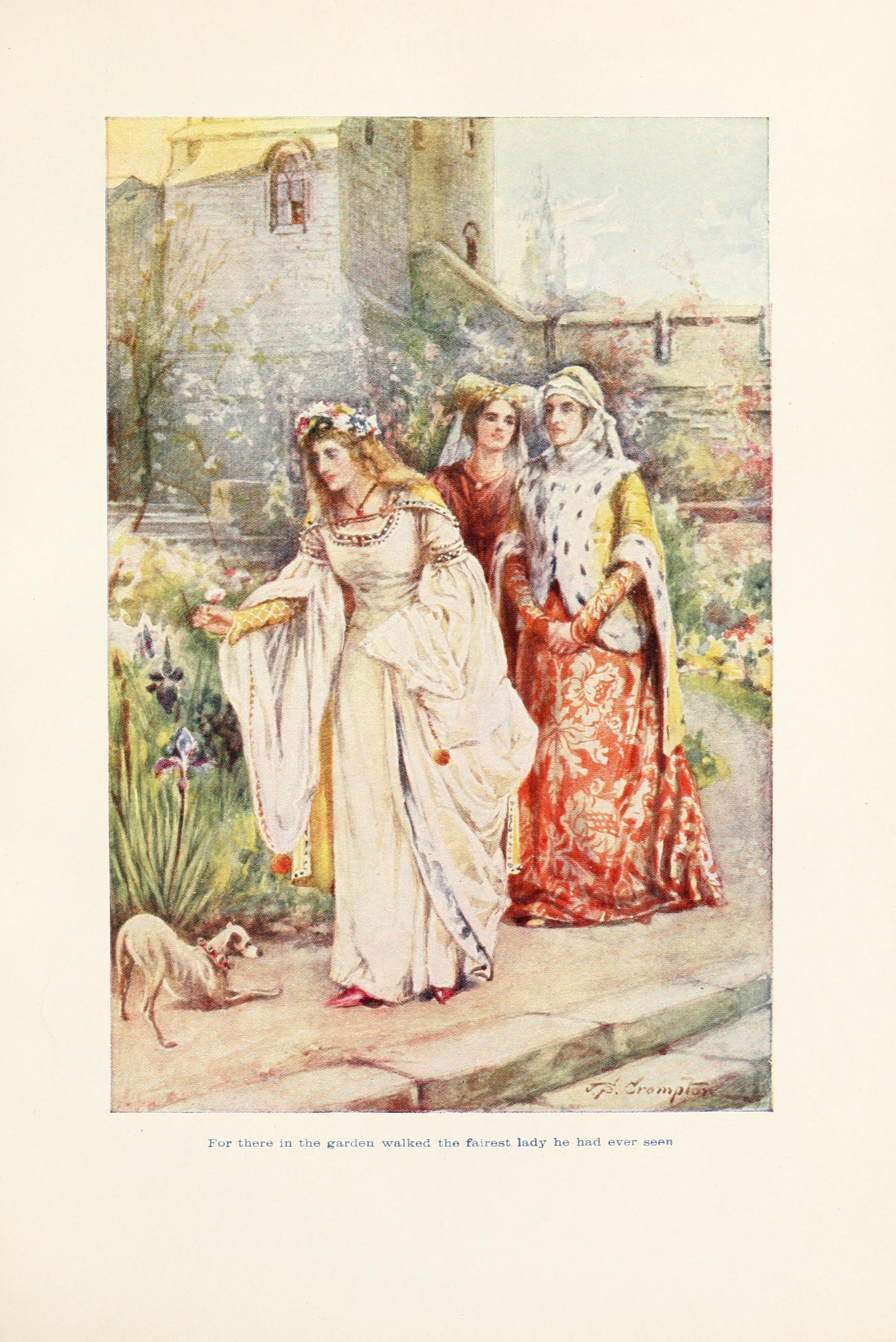
A modern depiction of Joan Beaufort

The regency council of the infant King Henry VI was inclined to have James released as soon as possible. In the early months of 1423, their attempts to resolve the issue produced little response from the Scots, clearly caused by the Albany Stewart faction. Archibald, Earl of Douglas, was an astute and adaptable power in Southern Scotland whose influence eclipsed that of the Albany Stewarts. Despite his complicity in James's brother's death, in Albany's castle in 1402, Douglas was still able to engage with the king. From 1421, Douglas had been in regular contact with James, and they formed an alliance that proved pivotal in 1423. Although Douglas was the pre-eminent Scottish magnate, his position in the borders and Lothians was jeopardised—not only did he forcibly have to remove his own appointed warden from Edinburgh Castle, but he was likely under threat from the Earls of Angus and March. In return for James’s endorsement of Douglas’s position within the kingdom, the earl committed his, and his affinity, to supporting the king’s homecoming. Also, the relationship between Murdoch—now Duke of Albany following his father's death in 1420—and his appointee Bishop William Lauder seemed strained, perhaps evidence of an influential grouping at odds with Murdoch's stance. Pressure from these advocates for the king almost certainly compelled Murdoch to agree to a general council in August 1423 when it was agreed that a mission should be sent to England to negotiate James's release. James's relationship with the House of Lancaster changed in February 1424 when he married Joan Beaufort, a cousin of Henry VI and the niece of Thomas Beaufort, 1st Duke of Exeter, and Henry, Bishop of Winchester. A ransom treaty of £40,000 sterling (less a dowry remittance of 10,000 marks) was agreed at Durham on 28 March 1424 to which James attached his own seal. The king and queen, escorted by English and Scottish nobles, reached Melrose Abbey on 5 April and were met by Albany who relinquished his governor's seal of office.

== Personal rule ==
=== First acts ===
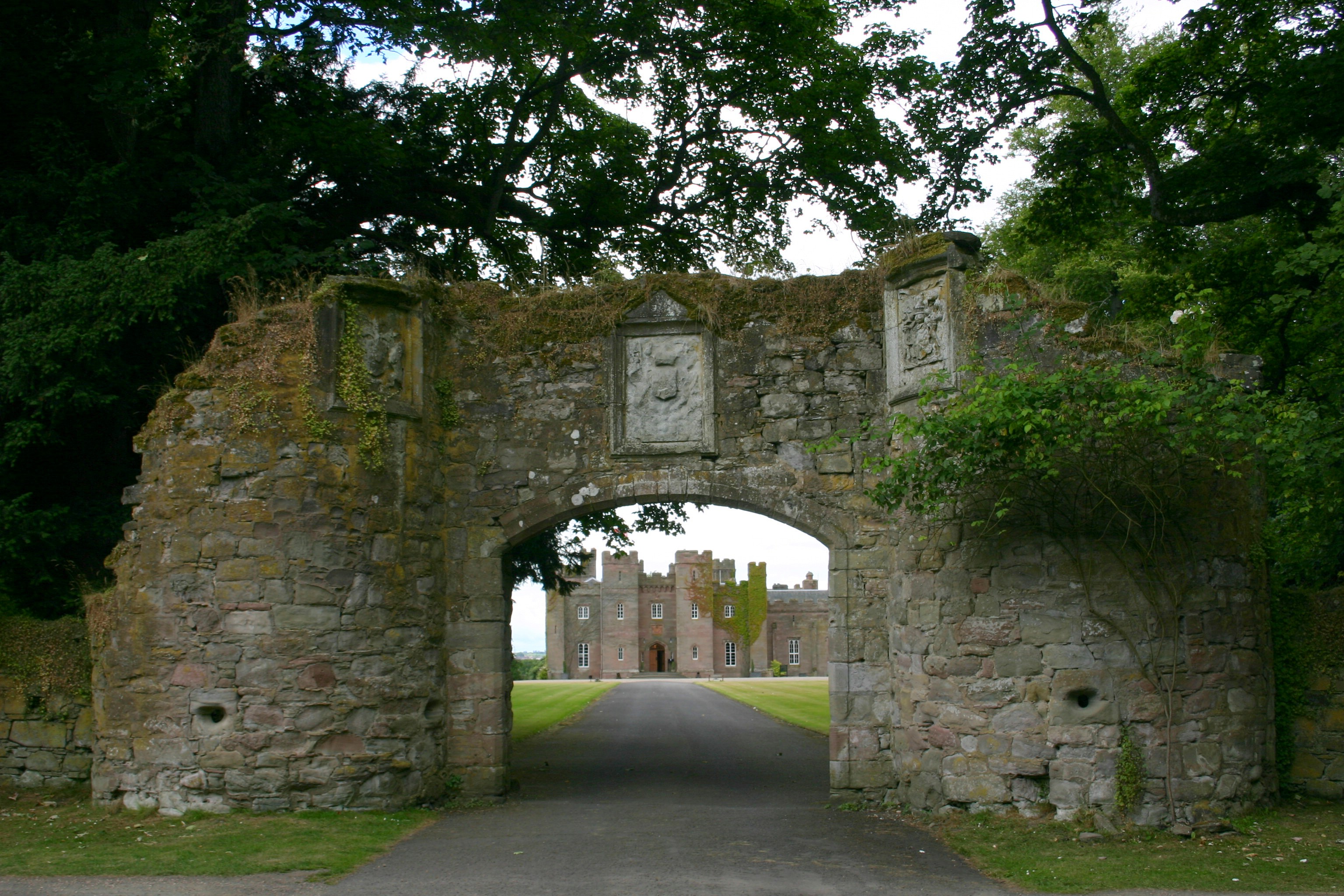
Entrance and only remaining part of Scone Abbey

Throughout the 15th century, Scottish kings suffered from a lack of crown revenue, and James's reign was no exception. The Albany regency had also been constrained; Duke Robert's own governorship fees were unsettled. For the nobility, royal patronage ceased entirely following James's capture; irregular forms of political favours emerged with Albany, allowing nobles such as the earl of Douglas and his brother James to remove funds from the customs. It was against this backdrop that James's coronation took place at Scone on 21 May 1424. The coronation parliament of the Three Estates witnessed the king perform a knighthood ceremony for eighteen prominent nobles including Alexander Stewart, Murdoch's son; an event probably intended to foster loyalty to the crown within the political community. Called primarily to discuss issues surrounding the finance of the ransom payments, the parliament heard James underline his position and authority as monarch. He ensured the passing of legislation designed to substantially improve crown income by revoking the patronage of royal predecessors and guardians. The earls of Douglas and Mar were immediately affected by this when their ability to remove large sums from the customs was blocked.

Despite this, James still depended on the nobility—especially Douglas—for its support and initially adopted a less confrontational stance. The early exception to this was Walter Stewart, Albany's son. Walter was the heir to the earldom of Lennox and had been in open revolt against his father in 1423 for not stepping aside to allow his younger brother, Alexander, to take the title. He also disagreed with his father's acquiescence to James's return to Scotland. James had Walter arrested on 13 May 1424 and imprisoned on the Bass Rock—at this time, this was probably in Murdoch's interests as well as James's. It is probable that the king felt unable to move against the rest of the Albany Stewarts while Murdoch's brother, John Stewart, Earl of Buchan, and Archibald, 4th Earl of Douglas, were fighting the English on the Dauphinist cause in France. Buchan, a leader with an international reputation, commanded the large Scottish army but both he and Douglas fell at the Battle of Verneuil in August 1424 and the Scottish army routed. The loss of his brother and the large fighting force left Murdoch politically exposed.

=== Ruthless and acquisitive ===
Douglas's death at Verneuil weakened the position of his son Archibald, the fifth earl. On 12 October 1424, the king and Archibald met at Melrose Abbey ostensibly to agree the appointment of John Fogo, a monk of Melrose, to the abbacy. The meeting may have been intended as an official acceptance of Douglas, but it also signalled a shift in Black Douglas domination of the crown and other nobles. Important Douglas allies died in France, and several of their heirs realigned with rival families through blood ties. Simultaneously, Douglas experienced a loosening of allegiances in the Lothians, which, with the loss of his command over Edinburgh Castle, improved James's position. Despite this, James retained Black Douglas support, which allowed him to begin a campaign of political alienation of Albany and his family. The reasons for this were perhaps not hard to find. James' brother David died in Duke Robert's custody and then both Robert's and Murdoch's shared indifference towards James' release from captivity. These factors may have led James to believe that their ultimate ambition was the throne itself. Buchan's lands did not fall to the Albany Stewarts but were forfeited by the crown. Albany's father-in-law, Duncan, Earl of Lennox, was imprisoned. In December, the duke's main ally Alexander Stewart, 1st Earl of Mar, settled his differences with the king. An acrimonious sitting of parliament in March 1425 precipitated the arrest of Murdoch, Isabella, his wife, and his son Alexander—of Albany's other sons Walter was already in prison and James, his youngest, also known as James the Fat, escaped into the Lennox.

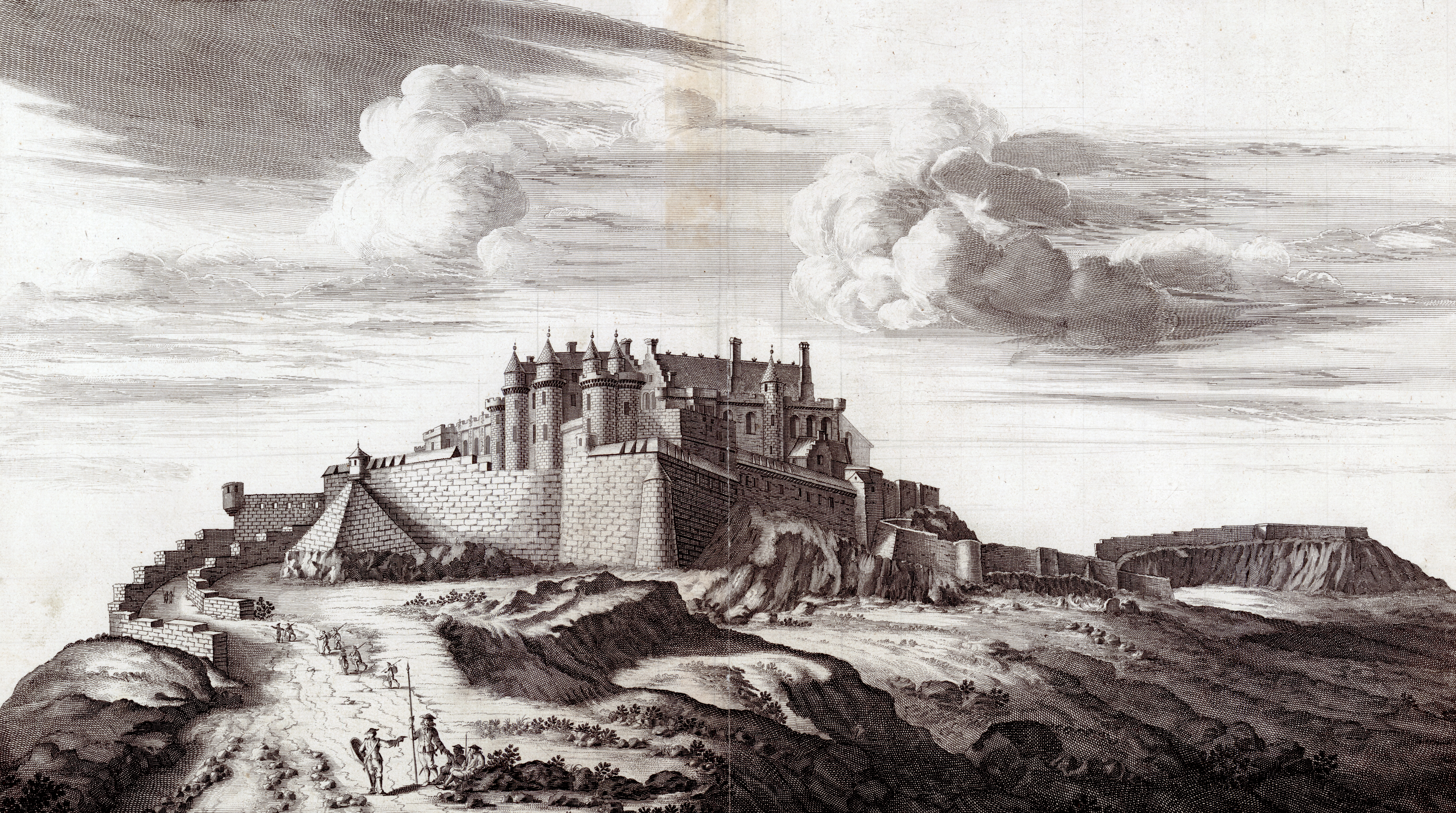
Stirling Castle, where the Albany Stewarts were executed

James the Fat led the men of Lennox and Argyll in open rebellion against the crown, and this may have been what the king needed to bring a charge of treason against the Albany Stewarts. Murdoch, his sons Walter and Alexander and Duncan, Earl of Lennox were at Stirling Castle for their trial on 18 May at a specially convened parliament. An assize of seven earls and fourteen lesser nobles was appointed to hear the evidence linking the prisoners to the rebellion in the Lennox. The four men were condemned, Walter on 24 May and the others on 25 May and were immediately beheaded "in front of the castle". James demonstrated a ruthless and avaricious side to his nature in the destruction of his close family, the Albany Stewarts, that yielded the three forfeited earldoms of Fife, Menteith and Lennox. An inquiry set up by James in 1424 into the dispersal of crown estates since the reign of Robert I exposed legal defects in several transactions where the earldoms of Mar, March and Strathearn together with the Black Douglas lordships of Selkirk and Wigtown were found to be problematic. Strathearn and March were forfeited in 1427 and 1435, respectively. Mar was forfeited in 1435 upon the earl's death without heir, which also meant that the lordships of Garioch and Badenoch reverted to the crown. James sought to boost his income further through taxation and succeeded in getting parliament to pass legislation in 1424 for a tax to go towards paying off the ransom—£26,000 was raised, but only £12,000 went to England. By 1429, James stopped the ransom payments completely and used the remainder of the taxation on buying cannons and luxury goods from Flanders. Following a fire in the castle of Linlithgow in 1425, funds were also diverted to the building of Linlithgow Palace which continued until James died in 1437 and absorbed an estimated one-tenth of royal income.

=== Relations with the church ===
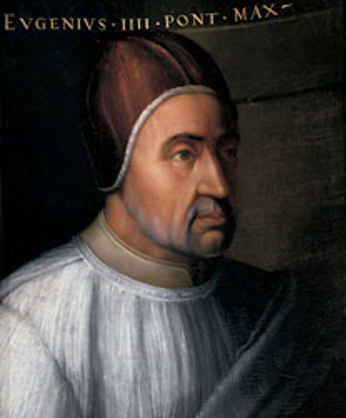
Pope Eugenius IV

James asserted his authority not only over the nobility but also upon the Church, lamenting that King David I's benevolence towards the Church proved costly to his successors, declaring that he was 'a sair sanct to the croun'. James also considered that the monastic institutions in particular needed improvement and that they should return to being strictly ordered communities. Part of James's solution was to create an assembly of overseeing abbots and followed this up by establishing a Carthusian priory at Perth to provide other religious houses with an example of internal conduct. He also sought to influence Church attitudes to his policies by having his own clerics appointed to the bishoprics of Dunblane, Dunkeld, Glasgow and Moray. In March 1425, James's parliament directed that all bishops must instruct their clerics to offer up prayers for the king and his family; a year later, parliament toughened up this edict insisting that the prayers be given at every mass under the sanction of a fine and severe rebuke. This same parliament legislated that every person in Scotland should 'be governed under the king's laws and statutes of this realm only'. From this, laws were enacted in 1426 to restrict the actions of prelates, whether it was to regulate their need to travel to the Roman Curia or their ability to purchase additional ecclesiastical positions while there. In James's parliament of July 1427, it is evident that statutes enacted were directed at reducing the powers of the church jurisdiction.

On 25 July 1431, the general council of the Church convened in Basel; however, the initial full meeting did not take place until 14 December, by which time Pope Eugenius and the council were in complete disagreement. It was the council, and not the pope, who requested that James send representatives of the Scottish church. It is known that two delegates—Abbot Thomas Livingston of Dundrenanan and John de Winchester, canon of Moray and a servant of the king—were in attendance in November and December 1432. In 1433, James, this time in response to a summons by the pope, appointed two bishops, two abbots and four dignitaries to attend the council. Twenty-eight Scottish ecclesiastics attended at intervals from 1434 to 1437. The majority of the higher ranking churchmen sent proxies but Bishops John Cameron of Glasgow and John de Crannach of Brechin did attend, as did Abbot Patrick Wotherspoon of Holyrood. Even in the midst of the Basel general council, Pope Eugenius instructed his legate, Bishop Antonio Altan of Urbino, to meet with James to raise the issue of the king's controversial anti-barratry laws of 1426. The Bishop of Urbino arrived in Scotland in December 1436 and apparently a reconciliation between James and the papal legate had taken place by the middle of February 1437 but the events of 21 February when James was assassinated prevented the legate from completing his commission.

=== Problems in the Highlands ===
In July 1428, the king convened a general council at Perth to obtain finance for an expedition to the Highlands against the semi-autonomous Lord of the Isles. The council initially resisted granting James the funds—even with royal support from the powerful Earls of Mar and Atholl—but eventually gave in to the king's wishes. Although it seemed that an all-out attack on the Gaels of the north was not the king's intention, James had resolved to use some force to strengthen royal authority. He told the assembly:

I shall go and see whether they have fulfilled the required service; I shall go I say and I will not return while they default. I will chain them so that they are unable to stand and lie beneath my feet.

The leaders of the Gaelic kindreds in the north and west were summoned by James ostensibly to a sitting of parliament in Inverness. Of those assembled, the king arrested around 50, including Alexander, the third Lord of the Isles, and his mother, Mariota, Countess of Ross, around 24 August. A few were executed, but the remainder, except for Alexander and his mother, were quickly released. During Alexander's captivity, James attempted to split Clann Dòmhnall—Alexander's uncle John Mór was approached by an agent of the king to take the clan leadership, but his refusal to have any dealings with the king while his nephew was held prisoner led to John Mór's attempted arrest and death.

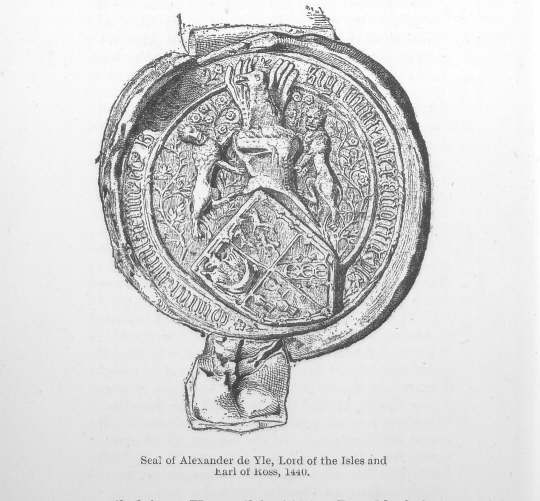
Seal of Alexander, Earl of Ross and Lord of the Isles.

The king's need for allies in the west and north led him to soften his approach towards the Lord of the Isles and, hoping that Alexander would now become a loyal servant of the crown, he was given his freedom. Alexander, probably under pressure from his close kinsman Donald Balloch, John Mór's son, and Alasdair Carrach of Lochaber, led a rebellion by attacking the castle and burgh of Inverness in spring 1429. The crisis deepened when a fleet from the Lordship was dispatched to bring James the Fat back from Ulster "to convey him home that he might be king". With James's intention to form an alliance with the Ulster O'Donnells of Tyreconnell against the MacDonalds, the English suspected the Scottish king's motives, and tried to bring James the Fat to England. Before he could become an active player, James the Fat died suddenly, releasing James to prepare for decisive action against the Lordship.

The armies met on 21 June in Lochaber, and Alexander, suffering the defection of Clan Chattan (the MacKintoshes) and Clan Cameron, was heavily defeated. Alexander escaped, probably to Islay, but James continued his assault on the Lordship by taking the strongholds of Dingwall and Urquhart castles in July. The king pushed home his advantage when an army reinforced with artillery was dispatched to the Isles. Alexander probably realised that his position was hopeless and tried to negotiate terms of surrender, but James demanded and received his total submission. From August 1429, the king delegated royal authority to Alexander Stewart, Earl of Mar, to restore peace in the north and west. The Islesmen rose again in September 1431 and inflicted two important defeats on the king's men—Mar's army was beaten at Inverlochy and Angus Moray's in a fierce battle near Tongue in Caithness. This was a serious setback for James and his credibility was adversely affected. In 1431, before the September uprising, the king had arrested two of his nephews, John Kennedy of Carrick and Archibald, Earl of Douglas possibly as a result of a conflict between John and his uncle, Thomas Kennedy, in which Douglas may have become involved.

Douglas's arrest had raised tensions in the country and James acted to reduce the unrest by freeing the earl on 29 September—it was quite likely that the king made the earl's release conditional on support at the forthcoming parliament at Perth at which James intended to push for further funding for the campaign against the Lordship. Parliament was in no mood to allow James unconditional backing—he was allowed a tax to fund his Highland campaign but parliament retained full control over the levy. The rules parliament attached to the taxation indicated a robust stand against further conflict in the north and probably led to the turnaround that took place on 22 October when the king 'forgave the offence of each earl, namely Douglas and Ross [i.e. Alexander]'. For Douglas, this was a formal acknowledgement of his release three weeks earlier, but for Alexander, it was a complete reversal of crown policy towards the Lordship. Four summer campaigns against the Lordship were now officially at an end with James's wishes having effectively been blocked by parliament.

=== Foreign policy ===
James's release in 1424 did not herald a new relationship with its southern neighbour. He did not become the submissive king that the English council had hoped for, but instead emerged as a confident and independently-minded European monarch. The only substantive matters of contention between the two kingdoms were the payments due under the terms of James's release, and the renewal of the truce expiring in 1430. In 1428 after setbacks on the battlefield Charles VII of France sent his ambassador Regnault of Chartres, Archbishop of Rheims to Scotland to persuade James to renew the Auld Alliance—the terms were to include the marriage of the princess Margaret to Louis, the dauphin of France, and a gift of the province of Saintonge to James. The ratification of the treaty by Charles took place in October 1428, and James, now with the intended marriage of his daughter into the French royal family and the possession of French lands, had his political importance in Europe boosted.

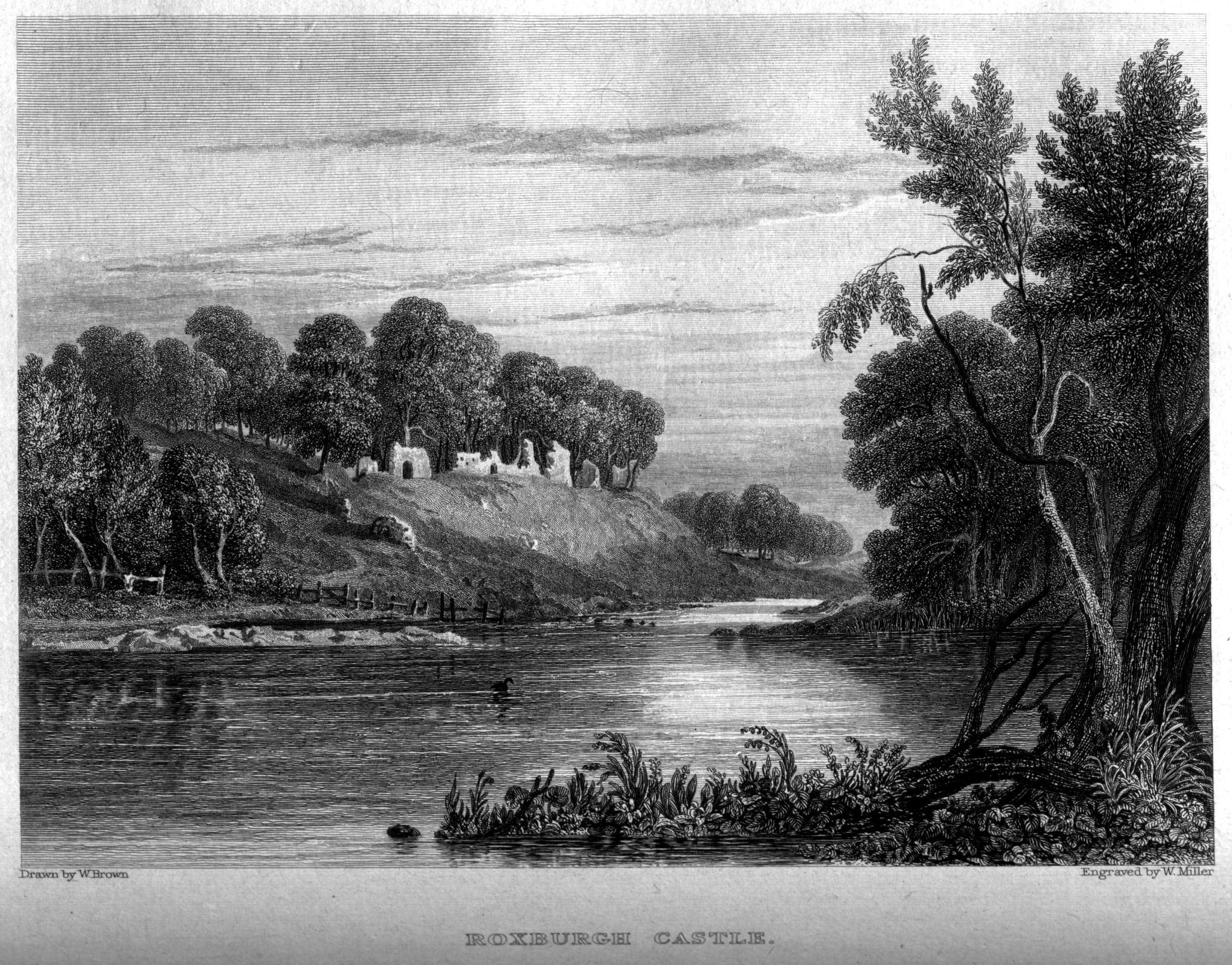
Roxburgh Castle, which James failed to win back from the English

The effectiveness of the alliance with France had virtually ceased after Verneuil, and its renewal in 1428 did not alter that. James adopted a much more non-aligned position with England, France and Burgundy while at the same time opening up diplomatic contacts with Aragon, Austria, Castile, Denmark, Milan, Naples and the Vatican. Generally, Scotto–English relations were relatively amicable and an extension of the truce until 1436 helped the English cause in France. The promises made in 1428 of a Scottish army to help Charles VII, and the marriage of James's eldest daughter to the French king's son Louis were unrealised. James had to balance his European responses carefully, because England's key ally, the Duke of Burgundy, was also in possession of the Low Countries, a major trading partner of Scotland, therefore muting James's support for France. The truce with England expired in May 1436, but James’s view of the Anglo‑French conflict shifted after a realignment of the combatants. The collapse of Anglo‑French negotiations in 1435 brought Burgundy into alliance with France, in turn prompting a French request for renewed Scottish involvement in the war and for the fulfilment of the promised marriage between Princess Margaret and the Dauphin.

In the spring of 1436, Princess Margaret sailed to France, and in August Scotland entered the war with James leading a large army to lay siege to the English enclave of Roxburgh Castle. The campaign was to prove pivotal, the Book of Pluscarden describes "a detestable split and most unworthy difference arising from jealosy" within the Scottish camp and the historian Michael Brown explains that a contemporary source has James appointing his young and inexperienced cousin Robert Stewart of Atholl as the constable of the host, ahead of the experienced march wardens, the earls of Douglas and Angus. Brown explains that both earls possessed considerable local interests and that the effects of such a large army living off the land may have created considerable resentment and hostility in the area. When the militant prelates of York and Durham together with the Earl of Northumberland took their forces into the marches to relieve the fortress, the Scots swiftly retreated—a chronicle written a year later said that the Scots 'had fled wretchedly and ignominiously'—but what is certain is that the effects and the manner of the defeat and the loss of their expensive artillery was a major reversal for James both in terms of foreign policy and internal authority.

== Assassination ==
=== Background ===
Walter Stewart was the youngest of Robert II's sons and the only one not to have been provided with an earldom during his father's lifetime. (Note: Robert II had four sons and five daughters by Elizabeth Mure before legitimising them after receiving papal dispensation in 1347 for their marriage. The sons of this marriage were: 1. John, Earl of Carrick who on becoming king chose the regnal name of Robert.; 2. Walter, Lord of Fife (d.1362); 3. Robert, Earl of Fife and later Duke of Albany; 4. Alexander, Lord of Badenoch and Ross and later Earl of Buchan; He later married Euphemia de Ross in 1355 and had two sons and two surviving daughters. The sons from this marriage were: 1. David, Earl of Caithness and Strathearn; 2. Walter, who later in life became Earl of Caithness, then Earl of Atholl and finally Earl of Strathearn.) Walter's brother, David, Earl of Strathearn and Caithness, had died before 5 March 1389, when his daughter Euphemia was first recorded as Countess of Strathearn. Walter, now ward to his niece, administered Strathearn for the next decade and a half during which time he aided his brother Robert, Earl of Fife and Guardian of Scotland by enforcing law and order upon another brother Alexander, lord of Badenoch—he again supported Robert (now Duke of Albany) against their nephew, David, Duke of Rothesay in 1402. Albany most likely engineered the marriage of Euphemia to one of his affinity, Patrick Graham and, by doing so, ended Walter's involvement in Strathearn. Duke Robert, possibly to make up for the loss of the benefits of Strathearn, made Walter Earl of Atholl and Lord of Methven. In 1413, Graham was killed in a quarrel with his own principal servant in the earldom, John Drummond.

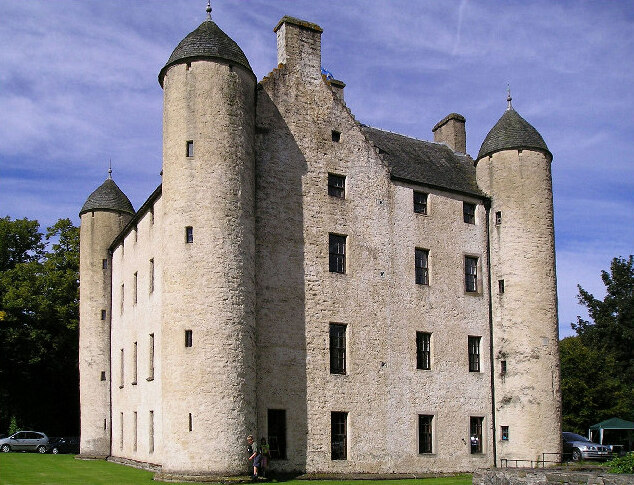
Methven Castle. The original castle was the seat of Walter Stewart, Earl of Atholl.

The Drummond kindred was close to Atholl, and the Earl's renewed involvement in Strathearn as ward to Graham's son, despite strong opposition from Albany, hinted at Atholl's possible involvement in the murder. The bad blood now existing between Albany and Atholl led James, on his return to Scotland in 1424, to ally himself with his uncle, Earl Walter. Atholl participated in the assize that sat over the 24/25 May 1425 that tried and found the prominent members of the Albany Stewarts guilty of rebellion—their executions followed swiftly.

James granted Atholl the positions of Sheriff of Perth and Justiciar, and also the earldom of Strathearn, but significantly, in life-rent only—acts that confirmed Earl Walter's policing remit given by Albany and his already effective grip on Strathearn. Atholl's elder son, David had been one of the hostages sent to England as a condition of James's release and had died there in 1434—his younger son, Alan died in the king's service at the Battle of Inverlochy in 1431. (Note: Atholl's son and heir, David Stewart, died as a hostage for James I in 1434. At least fifteen others died in captivity as James had ceased the payments to redeem the hostages by 1429. (See Grant, Independence and Nationhood, pp.188, 189)) David's son Robert, now Atholl's heir, was now in line to the throne after the young Prince James. James continued to show favour to Atholl and appointed his grandson Robert as his personal chamberlain. However, by 1437, after a series of setbacks at the hands of James, the earl and Robert probably viewed the king's actions as a prelude to further acquisitions at Atholl's expense. Atholl's hold on the rich earldom of Strathearn was weak, and both he and Robert would have realised that after the earl's death, Strathearn would revert to the crown. This meant that Robert's holdings would be the relatively impoverished earldoms of Caithness and Atholl, which amounted to no more than what had been Earl Walter's in the years between 1406 and 1416.

The retreat from Roxburgh cast doubt on his authority, military skill, and diplomacy, yet he persisted in prosecuting the war against England. Just two months after the Roxburgh fiasco, James called a general council in October 1436 to finance further hostilities through increased taxation. Parliament firmly resisted this, and their opposition was articulated by their speaker Sir Robert Graham, a former Albany attendant but now a servant of Atholl. The council then witnessed an unsuccessful attempt by Graham to arrest the king, resulting in the knight's imprisonment and banishment. However, James did not see Graham's actions as part of any extended threat. In January 1437, Atholl received yet another rebuff in his own heartlands when James overturned the chapter of Dunkeld Cathedral whose nominee was replaced by the king's nephew and firm supporter, James Kennedy.

=== Conspiracy and regicide ===
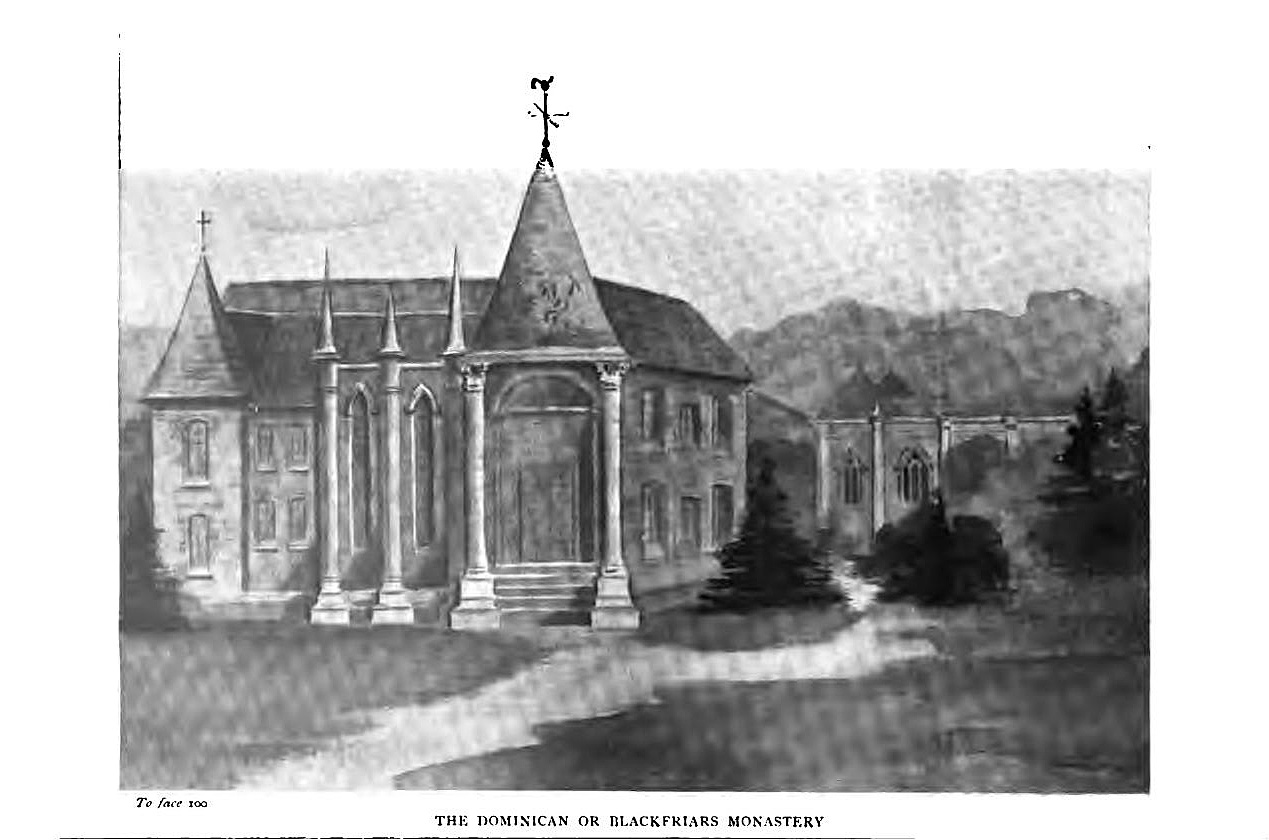
The Blackfriars monastery, Perth (now lost)

The reaction against the king at the general council had shown Atholl that not only was James on the back foot, but his political standing had been greatly damaged, and perhaps convinced the earl that James's killing was now a viable course of action. Atholl had seen how assertive action by two of his brothers at different times had allowed them to take control of the kingdom and that as James's nearest adult relative, the earl must have considered that decisive intervention on his part at this time could prove to be equally successful. (Note: Both of Atholl's older brothers in the senior royal line had taken matters into their own hands. In 1384, John Stewart, Earl of Carrick (the future Robert III) engineered a coup that sidelined his father, Robert II, and was appointed lieutenant to rule Scotland. In turn, Carrick was removed from power by his brother Robert Stewart, Earl of Fife (the future Duke of Albany) in 1388. Albany arrested Robert III's son, David Stewart, Duke of Rothesay, who was probably murdered in Albany's castle in 1402.)

The destruction of the Albany Stewarts in 1425 appears to have played a large part in the conspiracy against the king. Their judicial killing and forfeiture of their lands influenced the servants who administered and depended on these estates for their living. The resulting vacuum was filled by Atholl, in whose service many of these disaffected Albany men now appear. These included Sir Robert Graham, who only three months earlier had attempted to arrest the king at the Perth council, and the brothers Christopher and Robert Chambers. Even though Robert Chambers was a member of the Royal household, the old Albany ties were stronger.

A general council was held in Atholl's heartland in Perth on 4 February 1437, and crucially for the conspirators, the king and queen had remained in the town at their lodgings in the Blackfriars monastery. In the evening of 20 February 1437, the king and queen were in their rooms, separated from most of their servants. Atholl's grandson and heir Robert Stewart, the king's chamberlain, allowed his co-conspirators—thought to number about thirty—led by Robert Graham and the Chambers brothers access to the building. James was alerted to the men's presence, giving the king time to hide in a sewer tunnel, but with its exit recently blocked off to prevent tennis balls getting lost, James was trapped and murdered.

=== Aftermath ===
The assassins had achieved their priority in killing the king, but the queen, although wounded, had escaped. Importantly, the six-year-old prince, now King James II, had been safeguarded from Atholl's control by the removal of the earl's associate, John Spens, from his role as James's custodian. Spens vanished from the records following the regicide but the re-allocation of his positions and lands immediately following the murder indicate his part in the plot. Yet, in the chaos following the murder, it appeared that the queen's attempt to position herself as regent was not guaranteed. No surviving documentation exists that suggests that there was any general feeling of horror or condemnation aimed at the murderers. However, had the attempt on the queen’s life also succeeded, and had Atholl then taken control of the young king, his coup might have succeeded. The queen's small group of loyal supporters, which included the Earl of Angus and William Crichton, ensured her continued hold of James. This itself greatly reinforced her position, but Atholl still had followers. By the first week of March, neither side seemed to have the ascendancy and the Bishop of Urbino, the pope's envoy, called for the council to pursue a peaceful outcome.

... Yitte dowte I nott but theat yee schulle see the daye and tyme that ye schulle pray for my sowle, for the grete good that I have done to yow, and to all this reume of Scotteland, that I have thus slayne and deliverde yow of so crewell a tyrant...

... Yet I do not doubt but that you shall see the day and time that you shall pray for my soul, for the great good that I have done to you, and to all in this realm of Scotland, that I have thus slain and delivered you of so cruel a tyrant...

— Sir Robert Graham

Despite this, by the middle of March, both Angus and Crichton had probably mobilised to move against Atholl. It is equally likely that Atholl had gathered his forces to resist incursions into his heartlands—on 7 March the queen and the council entreated the burgess's of Perth to resist the forces of the 'feloune traitors'.

The position of Atholl and his circle of close supporters only collapsed after Earl Walter's heir, Robert Stewart, was captured and had, in Shirley's account, confessed to his part in the crime. Walter was taken prisoner by Angus and held at the Edinburgh Tolbooth where he was tried and beheaded on 26 March 1437, the day after the coronation of the young James II. Sir Robert Graham, the leader of the band of assassins was captured by former Atholl allies and was tried at a session of the council sitting at Stirling castle and subsequently executed sometime shortly after 9 April. Queen Joan's pursuit of the regency ended, probably at the council of June 1437, when Archibald, 5th Earl of Douglas, was appointed to act as the kingdom's lieutenant-general. The old king's embalmed heart may have been taken on a pilgrimage to the Holy Land following his internment at Perth Charterhouse, as the Exchequer Rolls of Scotland for 1443 note the payment of £90 to cover the costs of a knight of the Order of St John who had returned it to the Charterhouse from the Island of Rhodes.

== Historiography ==
The king, was of medium height, a little on the short side, with a well-proportioned body and large bones, strong limbed and unbelievably active, so that he . . . would challenge any one of his magnates of any size to wrestle with him.
– Walter Bower, Abbot of Inchcolm (written c.1424)

... [the king was] stocky and weighed down with fat [with] clear and piercing eyes
– future Pope Pius II, Eneas Silvius Piccolomini (written 1435)

James was a paradoxical figure. While a prisoner in England, he received a good education and developed into a cultured individual, becoming a poet, an accomplished musician and a sportsman. Walter Bower, abbot of Inchcolm, lists James's qualities as a musician—'not just as an enthusiastic amateur' but a master, another Orpheus.' His mastery included the organ, drum, flute and lyre. James's sporting abilities, such as wrestling, hammer throwing, archery and jousting, are also listed by Bower. He described James as possessing an 'eagerness' in 'literary composition and writing', the best known of which is his love poem, The Kingis Quair. Bower characterised the king as 'a tower, a lion, a light, a jewel, a pillar and a leader' and was 'our law giver king' who ended the 'thieving, dishonest conduct and plundering'.

Abbot Bower also described the king as capable of stabbing a near relative through the hand for creating a disturbance at court. The abbot was generally supportive of James, but he and others regretted the demise of the Albany Stewarts, and he was confounded by James's greed for territory and wealth. Although Bower did not dwell at length on the negative aspects of James's character, he alluded to the dismay of even those close to the king at his harsh regime. John Shirley's account of the events leading up to James's murder in the work The Dethe of the Kynge of Scotis provided an accurate narrative of politics in Scotland and which must have depended upon knowledgeable witnesses. The Dethe describes James as 'tyrannous' and whose actions were motivated by revenge and 'covetise ... than for anny laweful cawse'. Shirley agrees with Bower as far as the Albany Stewarts were concerned when he wrote that the Albanys whos dethe the people of the land sore grutched and mowrned. Writing nearly a century later both the chroniclers John Mair and Hector Boece relied extensively on Bower for their own narratives. They described James as the embodiment of good monarchy with Mair's eulogy that James '...indeed excelled by far in virtue his father, grandfather and his great-grandfather nor will I give precedence over the first James to any of the Stewarts', while Boece, in a similar vein, calls James the maist vertuous Prince that evir was afoir his days. Late in the 16th century the early historians George Buchanan and Bishop John Lesley from opposite ends of the religious spectrum both looked favourably on James's reign but were uneasily mindful of an enduring aggressive history regarding the king.

O happie realme! governit with so kinglie a king; O cruel creatures quha dang doune sa strang a stay piller, and uphold of the Realme! Thir tratoris, like howlets culd nocht suffir to sie the bricht lycht of sa mervellous vertue.

Oh happy realm! Governed by so kingly a king. Oh cruel creatures who struck down so strong a pillar, and upholder of the realm! The traitors, like owls could not suffer to see the bright light of so marvellous virtue.

— Bishop John Lesley

The first 20th-century history of James I was written by E.W.M. Balfour-Melville in 1936 and continued the theme of James as the strong upholder of law and order, and when describing Albany's trial and execution, he wrote, 'the King had proved that high rank was no defence for lawlessness; the crown was enriched by the revenues of Fife, Menteith and Lennox'. Balfour-Melville views James as a lawmaker and a 'reformer' whose legislation was aimed at not only increasing the position of the king but of parliament. Michael Lynch describes how James's positive reputation began immediately after his death when the Bishop of Urbino kissed his wounds and declared him a martyr. He suggests that the praise of the pro-James Scottish chroniclers and also of some modern historians to 'find strong kings to applaud' should not diminish the extent of parliament's ability to restrain the king, nor minimise the confrontation that took place between James and a more self-assured parliament. Stephen Boardman took the view that by the time of his death James had succeeded in breaking down the constraints on the exercise of royal authority which were rooted in the 'settlement of the kingdom' by Robert II. Christine McGladdery describes how opposing views were the result of 'competing propaganda after the murder'. To those who were glad to see the king dead, James was a tyrant who, without reason, aggressively assailed the nobility, imposing forfeiture on their estates and who 'failed to deliver justice to his people'. She also provides the opposite viewpoint that the king was seen as giving 'strong leadership against magnate excesses' and that the murder 'was a disaster for the Scottish people, leaving them to endure the instability of years of consequent faction fighting'. McGladdery maintained that James was the example for the Stewart kings to follow by putting 'Scotland firmly within a European context'.

Michael Brown described James as an 'able, aggressive and opportunistic politician' whose chief aim was to establish a monarchy of stature and free from the confrontations that had beset his father's reign. He characterises James as 'capable of highly effective short-term interventions' yet had failed to achieve a position of unqualified authority. Brown maintained that James had come to power after 'fifty years when kings looked like magnates and magnates acted like kings' and succeeded in completely changing the outlook and objectives of the monarchy. His policy of reducing the power and influence of the magnates, continued by his son James II, led to a more subordinate nobility. Alexander Grant repudiated James's reputation as the 'law giver' and explained that nearly all of the king's legislation were reconstructions of laws laid down by previous monarchs and concludes that 'the idea of James's return in 1424 marks a turning point in the development of Scots law is an exaggeration'. At James's death, only the Douglases of the predominant magnate houses were left and, according to Grant, this reduction was the most significant change to the nobility and was 'by far the most important consequence of James I's reign'.

== Marriage and issue ==
In London, on 12 February 1424, James married Joan Beaufort, daughter of John Beaufort, 1st Earl of Somerset and Margaret Holland. They had eight children:

- Margaret Stewart (1424 – 16 August 1445), married the Dauphin Louis, future Louis XI of France, at Tours, 24 June 1436.
- Isabella Stewart (1426 – 1499), married Francis I, Duke of Brittany, on 30 October 1442.
- Joan Stewart (c. 1428 – aft. 16 October 1486); she was mute. Married before 15 May 1459 to James Douglas, 1st Earl of Morton
- Alexander Stewart, Duke of Rothesay (born and died 16 October 1430), elder twin of James II
- James II of Scotland (16 October 1430 – 3 August 1460), married Mary of Guelders
- Eleanor Stewart (1433 – 20 November 1480), married Sigismund, Archduke of Austria, about 12/24 February 1449.
- Mary Stewart, Countess of Buchan (1434/35–20 March 1465), married Wolfert VI of Borselen in 1444.
- Annabella Stewart (1436–1509), married firstly 14 December 1447 Louis of Savoy, Count of Geneva, secondly in 1458 George Gordon, 2nd Earl of Huntly, before 10 March 1460.
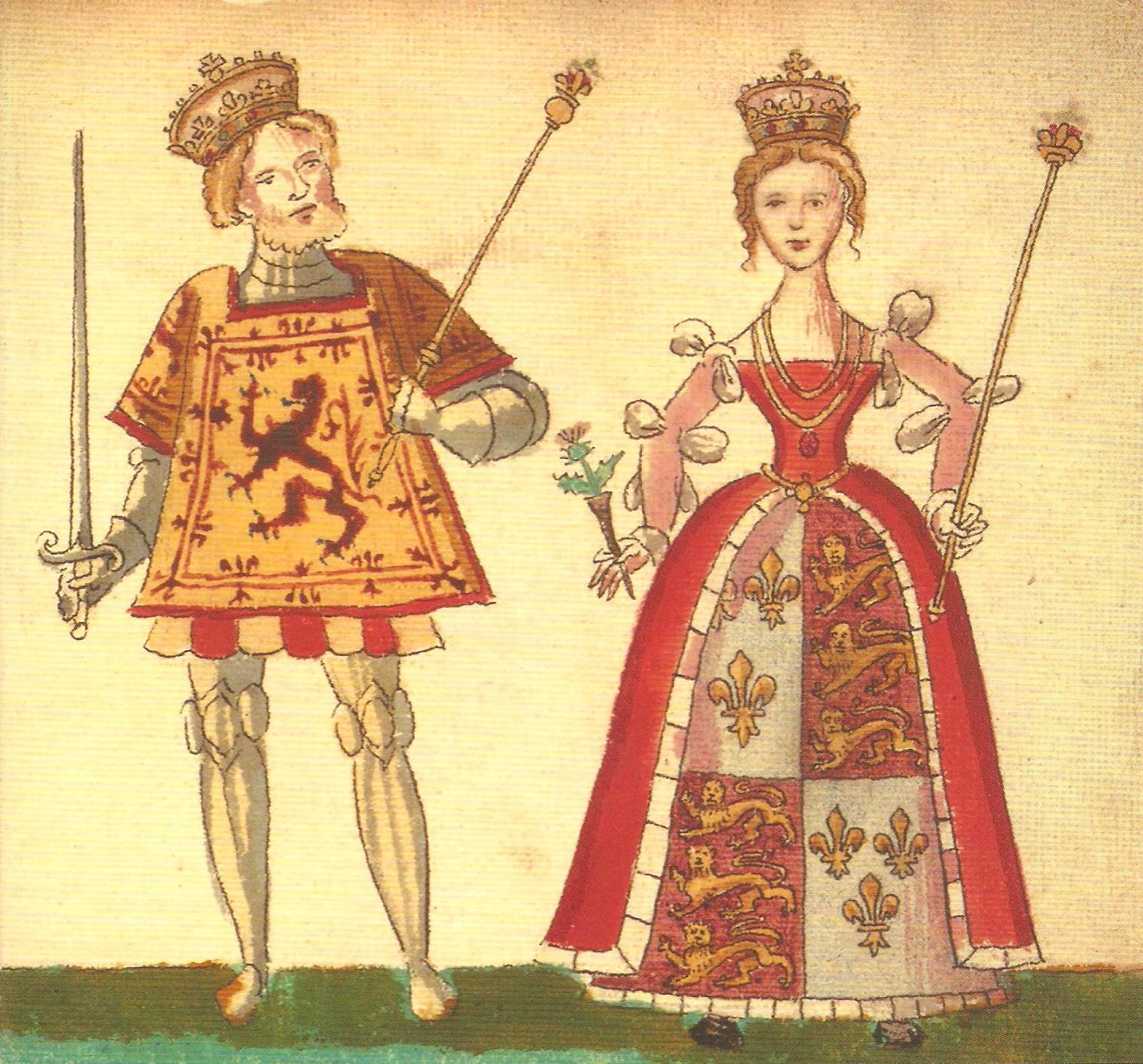
James I with his queen

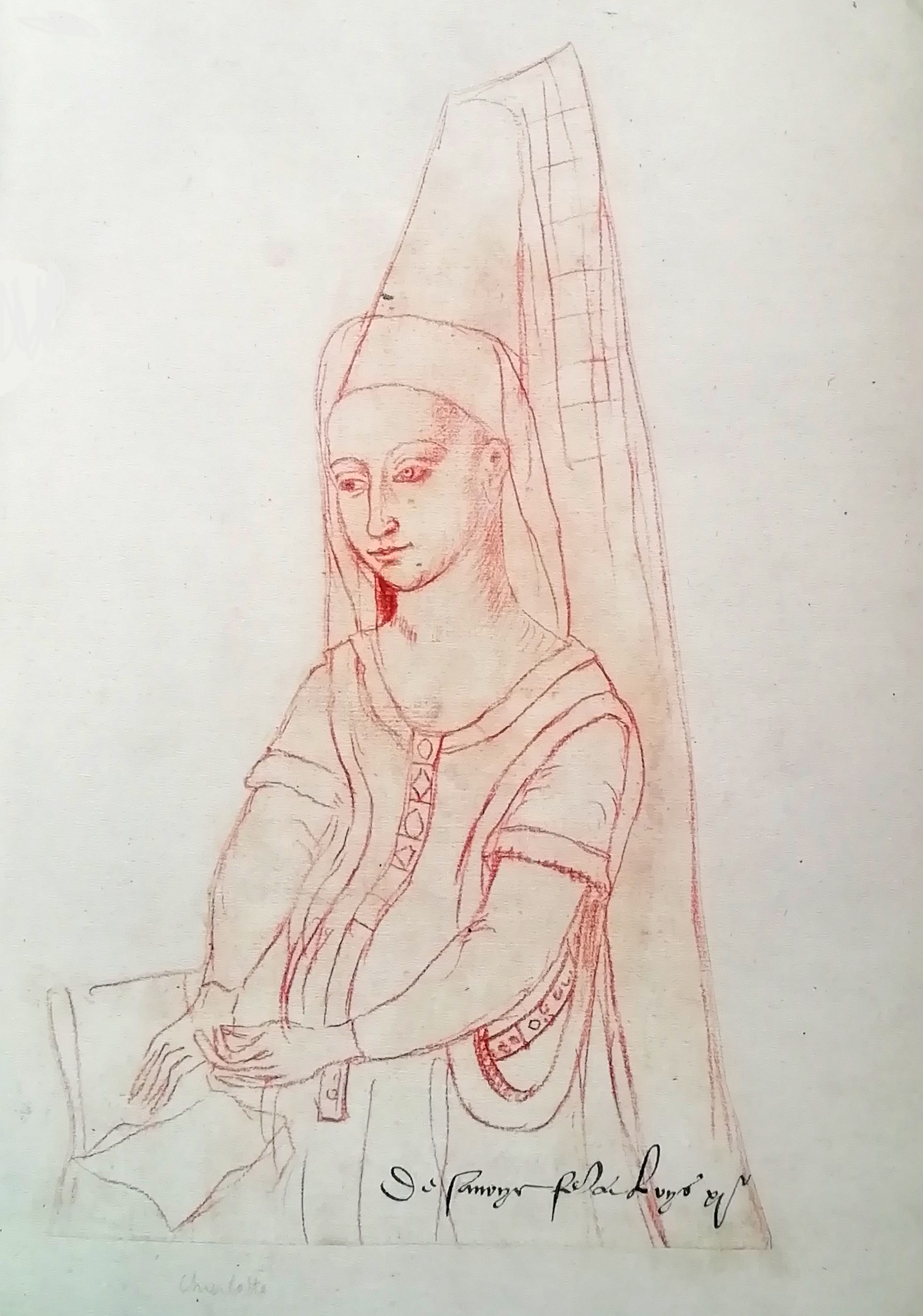
Margaret of Scotland

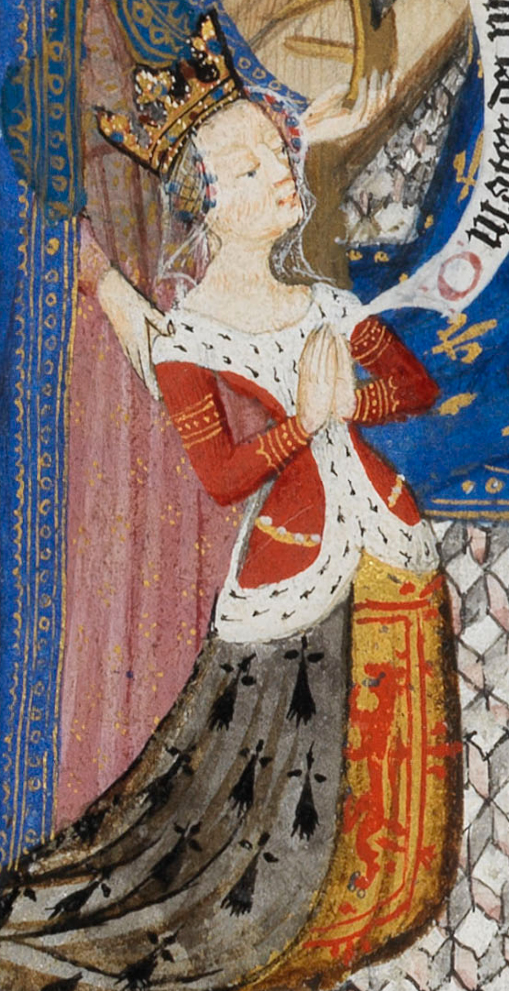
Isabella of Scotland

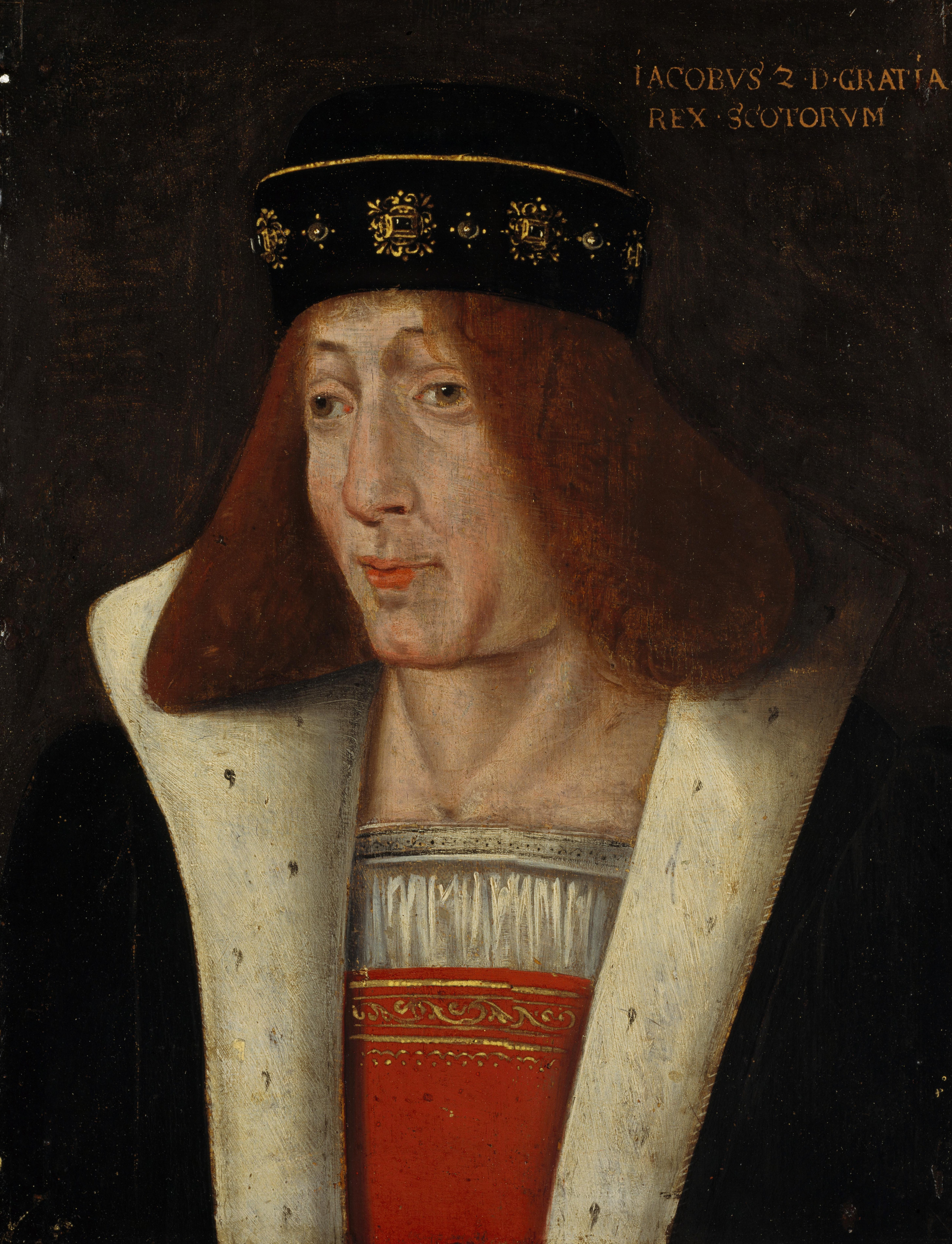
James II of Scotland

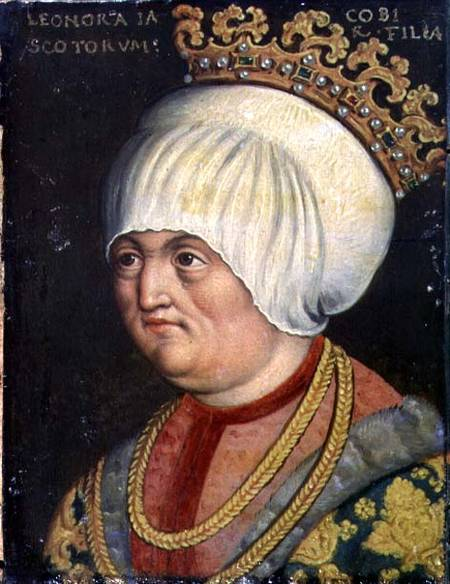
Eleanor of Scotland

== Ancestry ==
Ancestors of James I of Scotland

8. Walter Stewart, 6th High Steward of Scotland
4. Robert II of Scotland
9. Marjorie Bruce
2. Robert III of Scotland
10. Sir Adam Mure
5. Elizabeth Mure
11. Joanna Cunningham
1. James I of Scotland
12. Sir Malcolm Drummond
6. John Drummond
3. Anabella Drummond
14. Sir William Montfichet
7. Mary Montfichet

== Fictional portrayals ==
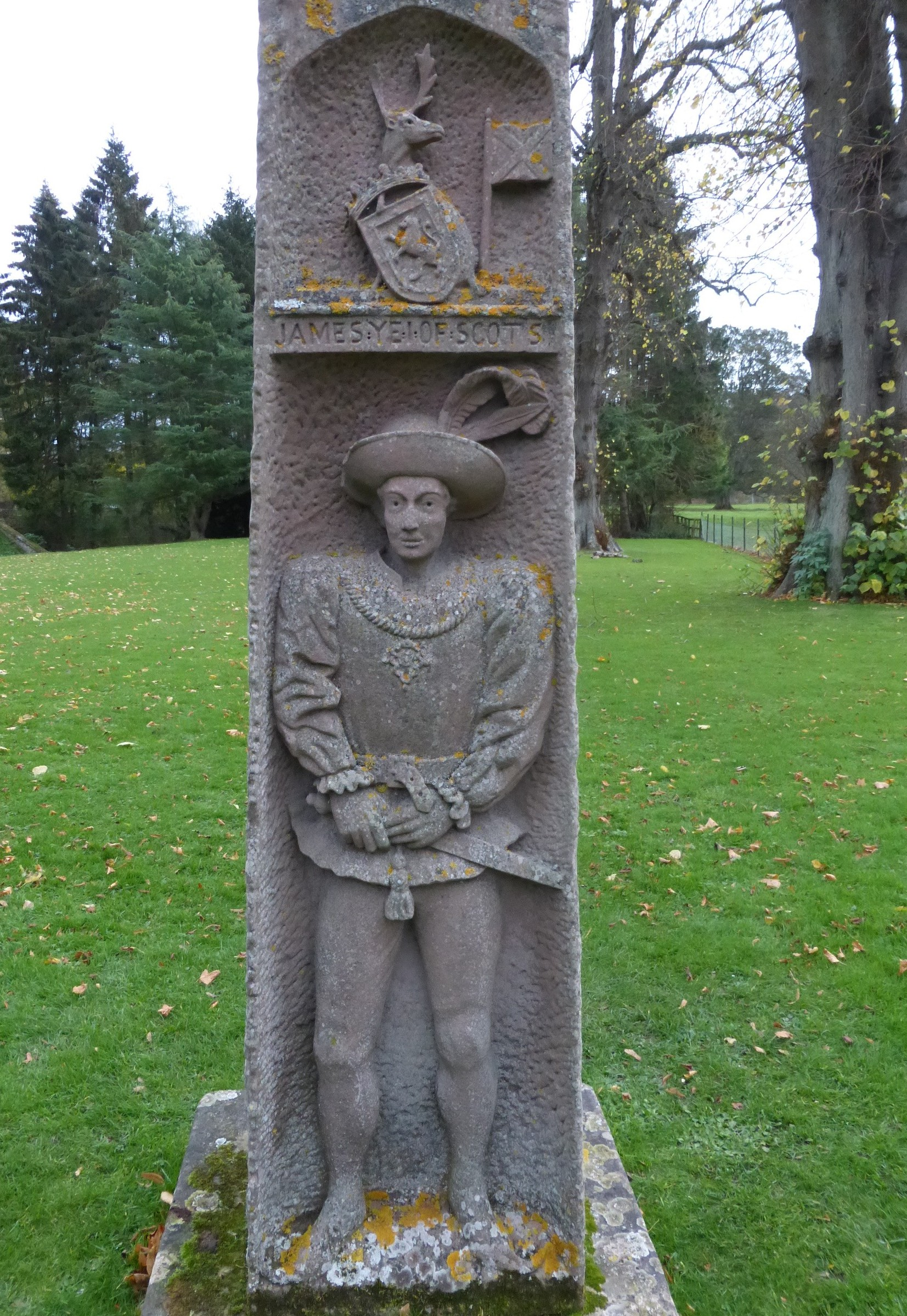
King James I monument (1814) at Dryburgh Abbey

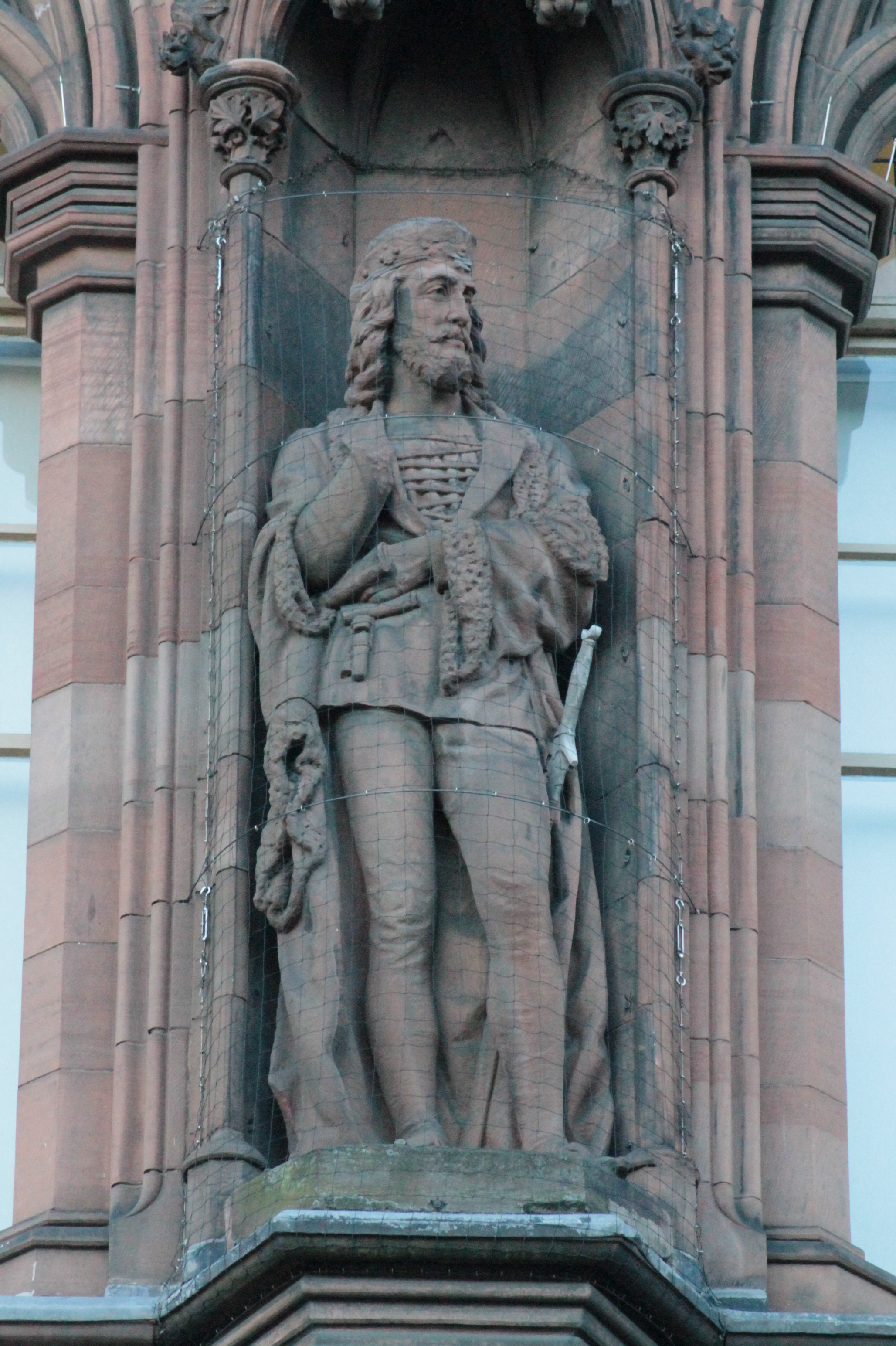
Statue of King James I, Scottish National Portrait Gallery

James I has been depicted in plays, historical novels and short stories. They include:

- The Caged Lion (1870) by Charlotte Mary Yonge. The novel depicts the captivity of James I in the Kingdom of England, with the main events taking place in 1421–1422. A friendly relationship with Henry V of England is prominently featured. Catherine of Valois and Richard Whittington are the most prominent among the secondary characters.
- A King's Tragedy (1905) by May Wynne. The novel depicts events of the years 1436–1437. The action leads to the assassination of James I. Catherine Douglas is among the characters featured.
- Lion Let Loose (1967) by Nigel Tranter. Covers the life of James I from c. 1405 to his death in 1437.
- A Royal Poet (1819) by Washington Irving. The author muses over the greatness of James I while on an excursion to Windsor Castle, mentioning two of his poems: "The Kingis Quair" and "Christ's Kirk of the Green".
- James I: The Key Will Keep The Lock (2014) by Rona Munro. A co-production between the National Theatre of Scotland, Edinburgh International Festival and the National Theatre of Great Britain. The James Plays—James I, James II and James III—are a trio of history plays by Rona Munro. Each play stands alone as a vision of a country tussling with its past and future. This play focuses on the personal development of James I after his release by Henry V of England, his marriage to Joan and the struggles with the noble families to establish his authority in Scotland.

== Sources ==
- Barrow, G. W. S. (2003), The Kingdom of the Scots, Edinburgh: Edinburgh University Press, ISBN 978-0-7486-1802-6
- Barrow, G. W. S. (2004). "Stewart family (per. c.1110–c.1350)". Oxford Dictionary of National Biography. Oxford Dictionary of National Biography. Vol. 1 (online ed.). Oxford University Press. doi:10.1093/ref:odnb/49411. (Subscription, Wikipedia Library access or UK public library membership required.)
- Boardman, Stephen (2007), The Early Stewart Kings: Robert II and Robert III, 1371–1406, The Stewart Dynasty in Scotland Series, Edinburgh: John Donald, an imprint of Birlinn Ltd, ISBN 978-1-904607-68-7
- Boardman, S. I. (2004). "Stewart, David, duke of Rothesay (1378–1402)". Oxford Dictionary of National Biography. Oxford Dictionary of National Biography. Vol. 1 (online ed.). Oxford University Press. doi:10.1093/ref:odnb/26468. (Subscription, Wikipedia Library access or UK public library membership required.)
- Boardman, S. I. (2004). "Stewart, David, first earl of Strathearn and first earl of Caithness (b. in or after 1357?, d. 1386?". Oxford Dictionary of National Biography. Oxford Dictionary of National Biography (online ed.). Oxford University Press. doi:10.1093/ref:odnb/54325. (Subscription, Wikipedia Library access or UK public library membership required.)
- Broun, Dauvit; Reid, Norman H; Boardman, Steve; Lynch, Michael; Wormald, Jenny (2007), "Kingship", in Lynch, Michael (ed.), The Oxford Companion to Scottish History (Oxford Reference Online ed.), Oxford: Oxford University Press, ISBN 9780199234820
- Brown, Michael (1994), James I, East Linton, Scotland: Tuckwell Press, ISBN 978-1-86232-105-2
- Brown, M. H. (2004). "James I". Oxford Dictionary of National Biography. Oxford Dictionary of National Biography (online ed.). Oxford University Press. doi:10.1093/ref:odnb/14587. (Subscription, Wikipedia Library access or UK public library membership required.)
- Brown, M. H. (2004). "Stewart, John, third earl of Buchan (c.1380–1424)". Oxford Dictionary of National Biography. Oxford Dictionary of National Biography (online ed.). Oxford University Press. doi:10.1093/ref:odnb/14587. (Subscription, Wikipedia Library access or UK public library membership required.)
- Brown, M. H. (2004). "Stewart, Murdoch, second duke of Albany (c.1362–1425)". Oxford Dictionary of National Biography. Oxford Dictionary of National Biography (online ed.). Oxford University Press. doi:10.1093/ref:odnb/14587. (Subscription, Wikipedia Library access or UK public library membership required.)
- Brown, M. H. (1996), "I have thus slain a tyrant – The Dethe of the Kynge of Scotis and the right to resist in early fifteenth-century Scotland", Innes Review, 47 (SPRING 1996): 24–44, doi:10.3366/inr.1996.47.1.24, ISSN 1745-5219.
- Brown, Michael H. (April–October 1992), "That Old Serpent and Ancient of Evil Days: Walter, Earl of Atholl and the Death of James I", The Scottish Historical Review, 71 (191/192. Parts 1 & 2): 23–45, JSTOR 25530532
- Cowan, Samual (1904), The Ancient Capital of Scotland, London: Simpkin, Marshall, Hamilton, Kent & Co
- David, Charles Wendell (1920), Robert Curthose, Duke of Normandy, London: Humphery Milford
- Fawcett, Richard & Oram, Richard (2004), Melrose Abbey, Stroud, Gloucestershire: Tempus Publishing Ltd, ISBN 978-0-7524-2867-3
- Grant, Alexander (2001), Independence and Nationhood, Scotland 1306–1469, Edinburgh: Edinburgh University Press, ISBN 978-0-7486-0273-5
- Lynch, Michael (1992), Scotland: A New History, London: Pimlico, ISBN 978-0-7126-9893-1
- McGladdery, Christine (2001), "The House of Stewart, 1371–1625", in Oram, Richard (ed.), The Kings & Queens of Scotland, Stroud, Gloustershire: Tempus Publishing Ltd, ISBN 978-0-7524-1991-6
- McGladdery, Christine (1990), James II, Edinburgh: John Donald Publishers Ltd, ISBN 978-0-85976-304-2
- MacQuarrie, Alan (2004), Medieval Scotland: Kingship and Nation, Gloucestershire, England: Sutton Publishing Limited, ISBN 978-0-7509-2977-6
- Munro, R. W.; Munro, Jean (2004). "MacDonald family (per. c.1300–c.1500):Earls of Ross". Oxford Dictionary of National Biography. Oxford Dictionary of National Biography (online ed.). Oxford University Press. doi:10.1093/ref:odnb/54280. ISBN 9780198614111. (Subscription, Wikipedia Library access or UK public library membership required.)
- Nield, Jonathan (1968), A Guide to the Best Historical Novels and Tales, Ayer Publishing, ISBN 978-0-8337-2509-7
- Penman, Michael (2001), "Robert III in The House of Stewart, 1371–1625", in Oram, Richard (ed.), The Kings & Queens of Scotland, Stroud, Gloustershire: Tempus Publishing Ltd, ISBN 978-0-7524-1991-6
- Rigby, S.H. (2003), A Companion to Britain in the Later Middle Ages, Oxford, United Kingdom: Blackwell Publishers Limited, ISBN 978-0-631-21785-5
- Round, J. Horace (1901), Studies in Peerage and Family History, Westminster, London: Archibald Constable & Co Ltd
- Stevenson, Katie (2006), 'Chivalry and knighthood in Scotland, 1424–1513, Woodbridge: The Boydell Press, ISBN 978-1-84383-192-1
- Watt, D. E. R. (2000), Medieval Church Councils in Scotland, Edinburgh: T&T Clark Ltd, ISBN 978-0-567-08731-7
- Weir, Alison (2008), Britain's Royal Families, London: Vintage, ISBN 978-0-09-953973-5
- Woodger, L. S. "Woodger, FENN, Hugh atte (d.1409), of Great Yarmouth, Norf.". The History of Parliament. Institute of Historical Research.
- Wylie, James Hamilton; Waugh, William Templeton (1914), The Reign of Henry the Fifth, The University Press, ASIN B00086QRQM
- Educational pamphlet, Investigating Linlithgow Palace, Historic Envoironment Scotland

James I of Scotland House of Stewart Born: 10 December 1394 Died: 21 February 1437
Regnal titles
Preceded by Robert III	King of Scots; 1406–1437	Succeeded by James II
