= Blackfriars, Perth =

Dominican friary in Scotland

Coordinates: 56.396°N 3.432°W

Church of the Blessed Virgin and Saint Dominic, Perth
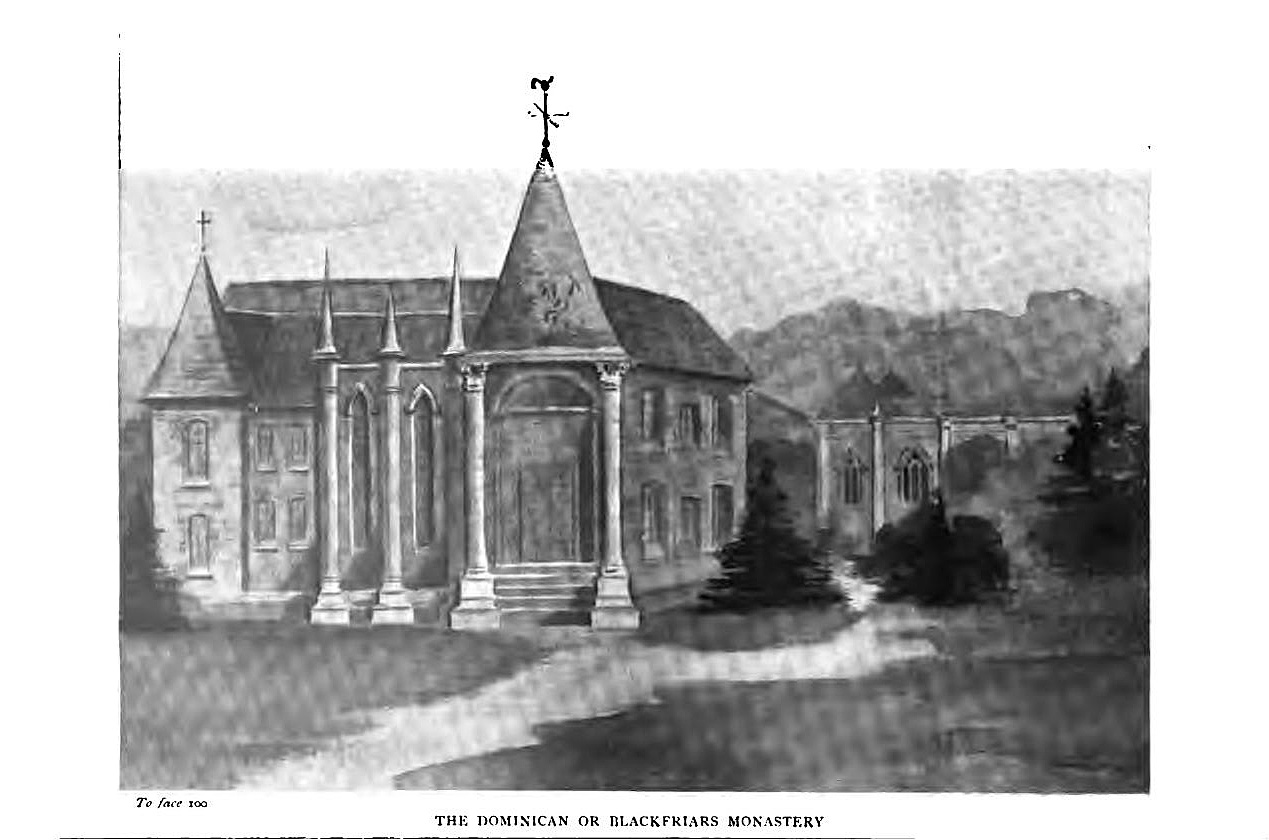

Monastery information
- Order: Dominican
- Established: c. 1240
- Disestablished: 1569
- Dedicated to: Blessed Virgin Mary and Saint Dominic
- Diocese: Diocese of St Andrews (Deanery of Gowrie)

People
- Founder: Alexander II of Scotland
- Important associated figures: James I of Scotland

The Church of the Friars Preachers of Blessed Virgin and Saint Dominic at Perth, commonly called "Blackfriars", was a mendicant friary of the Dominican Order of the Catholic Church founded in the 13th century at Perth, Scotland. The Dominicans ("Black friars") were said by Walter Bower to have been brought to Scotland in 1230 by King Alexander II of Scotland, while John Spottiswood held that they were brought to Scotland by William de Malveisin, Bishop of St Andrews. Later tradition held that the Perth Dominican friary was founded by King Alexander II.

The Pontifical Offices of St Andrews listed the friary as having been dedicated on 13 May 1240. The earliest surviving grant to the church dates to 31 October 1241. Perth was perhaps the most important royal centre in the Kingdom of Scotland until the reign of King James III of Scotland, and the Dominican friary was frequently used for national church councils and as a residence for the King of the Scots. It was at Blackfriars church that King James I of Scotland was murdered on the night of 21 February 1437, by followers of the Earl of Atholl.

With the growth of Protestantism in Scotland, friaries were targeted by reformers more than any other church institutions, partly because their vitality posed the biggest threat. A Perth mob attacked the church on 14 May 1543, and on 11 May 1559, it and the other religious houses of the city were attacked, looted and put out of order. King James VI of Scotland granted all the property of the church to the burgh of Perth on 9 August 1569, nine years after the Reformation Parliament of 1560.

The monastery's southern wall was found to also be the northern wall of the Fair Maid's House in 2006.

== See also ==
- Greyfriars, Perth
