= List of peers 1390–1399 =

This page lists all peers who held extant titles between 1390 and 1399.

== Peerage of England ==
Title	Holder	Date gained	Date lost	Notes
Duke of Cornwall (1337)	None	1377	1399	
Duke of Cornwall (1337)	Henry of Monmouth	1399	1413	1st Duke of Lancaster (1399)
Duke of Lancaster (1362)	John of Gaunt, 1st Duke of Lancaster	1362	1399	
Duke of Lancaster (1362)	Henry of Bolingbroke	1399	1399	Duke of Hereford (1397); Elected King, and all his honours merged in the Crown
Duke of York (1385)	Edmund of Langley, 1st Duke of York	1385	1402	
Duke of Gloucester (1385)	Thomas of Woodstock, 1st Duke of Gloucester	1385	1397	Declared guilty of treason, whereby all his honours were forfeited
Duke of Aumale (1397)	Edward of Norwich	1397	1399	Deprived of the title; also Earl of Rutland (1390-1402)
Duke of Exeter (1397)	John Holland, 1st Duke of Exeter	1397	1399	Attainted, and all his honours became forfeited
Duke of Surrey (1397)	Thomas Holland, 1st Duke of Surrey	1397	1399	Deprived of the title
Duke of Norfolk (1397)	Thomas de Mowbray, 1st Duke of Norfolk	1397	1399	Deprived of the dukedom, see Earl of Norfolk below
Duchess of Norfolk (1397)	Margaret, Duchess of Norfolk	1397	1399	Title created for life; died
Duke of Lancaster (1399)	Henry of Monmouth	1399	1416	New creation, also Duke of Cornwall, see above
Marquess of Dorset (1397)	John Beaufort, 1st Marquess of Dorset and Somerset	1397	1399	New creation, Also Marquess of Somerset; both titles degraded to Earl of Somerset, see below
Earl of Surrey (1088)	Richard FitzAlan, 9th Earl of Surrey	1376	1397	11th Earl of Arundel; died
Earl of Surrey (1088)	Richard FitzAlan, 9th Earl of Surrey	1376	1397	11th Earl of Arundel; attainted and his honours were forfeited
Earl of Warwick (1088)	Thomas de Beauchamp, 12th Earl of Warwick	1369	1401	
Earl of Oxford (1142)	none	1388	1392	Attainted
Earl of Oxford (1142)	Aubrey de Vere, 10th Earl of Oxford	1392	1400	
Earl of Norfolk (1312)	Margaret, 2nd Countess of Norfolk	1375	1399	Created Duchess of Norfolk, see above
Earl of Norfolk (1312)	Thomas de Mowbray, 3rd Earl of Norfolk	1399	1400	Deprived of Dukedom
Earl of March (1328)	Roger Mortimer, 4th Earl of March	1381	1398	Died
Earl of March (1328)	Edmund Mortimer, 5th Earl of March	1398	1425	
Earl of Devon (1335)	Edward de Courtenay, 3rd Earl of Devon	1377	1419	
Earl of Salisbury (1337)	William de Montacute, 2nd Earl of Salisbury	1344	1397	Died
Earl of Salisbury (1337)	John Montacute, 3rd Earl of Salisbury	1397	1400	
Earl of Stafford (1351)	Thomas Stafford, 3rd Earl of Stafford	1386	1392	Died
Earl of Stafford (1351)	William Stafford, 4th Earl of Stafford	1392	1395	Died
Earl of Stafford (1351)	Edmund Stafford, 5th Earl of Stafford	1395	1403	
Earl of Kent (1360)	Thomas Holland, 2nd Earl of Kent	1360	1397	Died
Earl of Kent (1360)	Thomas Holland, 3rd Earl of Kent	1397	1400	Duke of Surrey 1397-1399, see above
Earl of Richmond (1372)	John V, Duke of Brittany	1372	1399	Forfeited
Earl of Northumberland (1377)	Henry Percy, 1st Earl of Northumberland	1377	1406	
Earl of Nottingham (1383)	Thomas de Mowbray, 1st Earl of Nottingham	1383	1399	Created Duke of Norfolk, see above
Earl of Suffolk (1385)	Michael de la Pole, 2nd Earl of Suffolk	1399	1415	Restored to his father's dignities
Earl of Huntingson (1387)	John Holland, 1st Earl of Huntingdon	1388	1400	Created Duke of Exeter, see above
Earl of Somerset (1397)	John Beaufort, 1st Earl of Somerset	1397	1410	Marquess of Dorset and Somerset 1397-1399
Earl of Gloucester (1397)	Thomas le Despenser, 1st Earl of Gloucester	1397	1399	New creation; degraded from his Earldom
Earl of Westmorland (1397)	Ralph Neville, 1st Earl of Westmorland	1397	1425	New creation
Earl of Wiltshire (1397)	William le Scrope, 1st Earl of Wiltshire	1397	1399	New creation; executed and attainted
Earl of Worcester (1397)	Thomas Percy, 1st Earl of Worcester	1397	1403	New creation
Baron de Ros (1264)	John de Ros, 5th Baron de Ros	1383	1394	Died
Baron de Ros (1264)	William de Ros, 6th Baron de Ros	1393	1414	
Baron le Despencer (1264)	none	1326	1397	Attainted
Baron le Despencer (1264)	Thomas le Despencer, 6th Baron Despencer	1397	1399	Attainder reversed; created Earl of Gloucester; attainted again
Baron Basset of Drayton (1264)	Ralph Basset, 4th Baron Basset of Drayton	1344	1390	Died, title either abeyant or dormant
Baron Berkeley (1295)	Thomas de Berkeley, 5th Baron Berkeley	1368	1418	
Baron Fauconberg (1295)	Thomas de Fauconberg, 5th Baron Fauconberg	1362	1407	
Baron FitzWalter (1295)	Walter FitzWalter, 5th Baron FitzWalter	1386	1406	
Baron FitzWarine (1295)	Fulke FitzWarine, 5th Baron FitzWarine	1377	1391	Died
Baron FitzWarine (1295)	Fulke FitzWarine, 6th Baron FitzWarine	1391	1407	
Baron Grey de Wilton (1295)	Henry Grey, 5th Baron Grey de Wilton	1370	1396	Died
Baron Grey de Wilton (1295)	Richard Grey, 6th Baron Grey de Wilton	1396	1442	
Baron Mauley (1295)	Peter de Mauley, 4th Baron Mauley	1383	1415	
Baron Neville de Raby (1295)	Ralph Neville, 4th Baron Neville de Raby	1388	1425	Created Earl of Westmoreland, see above
Baron Bardolf (1299)	Thomas Bardolf, 5th Baron Bardolf	1385	1407	
Baron Clinton (1299)	John de Clinton, 3rd Baron Clinton	1335	1398	Died
Baron Clinton (1299)	William de Clinton, 4th Baron Clinton	1398	1431	
Baron De La Warr (1299)	John la Warr, 4th Baron De La Warr	1370	1398	Died
Baron De La Warr (1299)	Thomas la Warr, 5th Baron De La Warr	1398	1427	
Baron Ferrers of Chartley (1299)	Robert de Ferrers, 5th Baron Ferrers of Chartley	1367	1416	
Baron Lovel (1299)	John Lovel, 5th Baron Lovel	1361	1408	
Baron Scales (1299)	Robert de Scales, 5th Baron Scales	1386	1402	
Baron Tregoz (1299)	Thomas de Tregoz, 3rd Baron Tregoz	1322	1405	
Baron Welles (1299)	John de Welles, 5th Baron Welles	1361	1421	
Baron de Clifford (1299)	Thomas de Clifford, 6th Baron de Clifford	1389	1391-3	Died
Baron de Clifford (1299)	John Clifford, 7th Baron de Clifford	1391-3	1422	
Baron Ferrers of Groby (1299)	William Ferrers, 5th Baron Ferrers of Groby	1388	1445	
Baron Furnivall (1299)	Joane de Furnivall, suo jure Baroness Furnivall	1383	1407	
Baron Latimer (1299)	Elizabeth Latimer, suo jure Baroness Latimer	1381	1395	Died
Baron Latimer (1299)	John Nevill, 6th Baron Latimer	1395	1430	
Baron Morley (1299)	Thomas de Morley, 4th Baron Morley	1379	1416	
Baron Strange of Knockyn (1299)	John le Strange, 6th Baron Strange of Knockyn	1381	1397	Died
Baron Strange of Knockyn (1299)	Richard le Strange, 7th Baron Strange of Knockyn	1397	1449	
Baron Botetourt (1305)	Joan de Botetourt, suo jure Baroness Botetourt	1385	1406	
Baron Boteler of Wemme (1308)	Elizabeth Le Boteler, de jure Baroness Boteler of Wemme	1361	1411	
Baron Zouche of Haryngworth (1308)	William la Zouche, 3rd Baron Zouche	1382	1396	Died
Baron Zouche of Haryngworth (1308)	William la Zouche, 4th Baron Zouche	1396	1415	
Baron Beaumont (1309)	John Beaumont, 4th Baron Beaumont	1369	1396	Died
Baron Beaumont (1309)	Henry Beaumont, 5th Baron Beaumont	1396	1413	
Baron Monthermer (1309)	Margaret de Monthermer, suo jure Baroness Monthermer	1340	1390	Died, title succeeded by her son John, who in 1397 became Earl of Salisbury (see above)
Baron Strange of Blackmere (1309)	Ankaret Lestrangee, suo jure Baroness Strange of Blackmere	1383	1413	
Baron Lisle (1311)	Robert de Lisle, 3rd Baron Lisle	1356	1399	Died, Barony extinct
Baron Audley of Heleigh (1313)	Nicholas de Audley, 3rd Baron Audley of Heleigh	1386	1391	Died
Baron Audley of Heleigh (1313)	in abeyance	1391	1405	
Baron Cobham of Kent (1313)	John de Cobham, 3rd Baron Cobham of Kent	1355	1408	
Baron Saint Amand (1313)	Almaric de St Amand, 3rd Baron Saint Amand	1382	1402	
Baron Cherleton (1313)	John Cherleton, 4th Baron Cherleton	1374	1401	
Baron Say (1313)	Elizabeth de Say, suo jure Baroness Say	1382	1399	Died, Barony fell into abeyance
Baron Willoughby de Eresby (1313)	Robert Willoughby, 4th Baron Willoughby de Eresby	1372	1396	Died
Baron Willoughby de Eresby (1313)	William Willoughby, 5th Baron Willoughby de Eresby	1396	1409	
Baron Holand (1314)	Maud de Holland, suo jure Baroness Holand	1373	1420	
Baron Dacre (1321)	William Dacre, 5th Baron Dacre	1383	1398	Died
Baron Dacre (1321)	Thomas Dacre, 6th Baron Dacre	1398	1458	
Baron FitzHugh (1321)	Henry FitzHugh, 3rd Baron FitzHugh	1386	1425	
Baron Greystock (1321)	Ralph de Greystock, 3rd Baron Greystock	1358	1417	
Baron Grey of Ruthin (1325)	Reginald Grey, 3rd Baron Grey de Ruthyn	1388	1441	
Baron Harington (1326)	Robert Harington, 3rd Baron Harington	1363	1406	
Baron Burghersh (1330)	Elizabeth de Burghersh, 3rd Baroness Burghersh	1369	1409	
Baron Maltravers (1330)	Eleanor Maltravers, 2nd Baroness Maltravers	1377	1405	
Baron Darcy de Knayth (1332)	Philip Darcy, 4th Baron Darcy de Knayth	1362	1398	Died
Baron Darcy de Knayth (1332)	John Darcy, 5th Baron Darcy de Knayth	1398	1411	
Baron Talbot (1332)	Richard Talbot, 4th Baron Talbot	1387	1396	Died
Baron Talbot (1332)	Gilbert Talbot, 5th Baron Talbot	1396	1419	
Baron Poynings (1337)	Robert Poynings, 5th Baron Poynings	1387	1446	
Baron Cobham of Sterborough (1342)	Reginald de Cobham, 2nd Baron Cobham of Sterborough	1361	1403	
Baron Bourchier (1342)	John Bourchier, 2nd Baron Bourchier	1349	1400	
Baron Bryan (1350)	Guy Bryan, 1st Baron Bryan	1350	1390	Died, Barony fell into abeyance
Baron Burnell (1350)	Hugh Burnell, 2nd Baron Burnell	1383	1420	
Baron Scrope of Masham (1350)	Henry Scrope, 1st Baron Scrope of Masham	1350	1391	Died
Baron Scrope of Masham (1350)	Stephen Scrope, 2nd Baron Scrope of Masham	1391	1406	
Baron Saint Maur (1351)	Richard St Maur, 3rd Baron Saint Maur	1361	1401	
Baron le Despencer (1357)	Thomas le Despenser, 2nd Baron le Despencer	1375	1400	Created Earl of Gloucester, see above
Baron Lisle (1357)	Margaret de Lisle, 3rd Baroness Lisle	1382	1392	Died
Baron Lisle (1357)	Elizabeth de Berkeley, 4th Baroness Lisle	1392	1420	
Baron Montacute (1357)	John de Montacute, 1st Baron Montacute	1357	1390	Died
Baron Montacute (1357)	John de Montacute, 2nd Baron Montacute	1390	1400	Succeeded as Earl of Salisbury, see above
Baron Botreaux (1368)	William de Botreaux, 1st Baron Botreaux	1368	1391	Died
Baron Botreaux (1368)	William de Botreaux, 2nd Baron Botreaux	1391	1392	Died
Baron Botreaux (1368)	William de Botreaux, 3rd Baron Botreaux	1392	1462	
Baron Scrope of Bolton (1371)	Richard le Scrope, 1st Baron Scrope of Bolton	1371	1403	
Baron Cromwell (1375)	Ralph de Cromwell, 1st Baron Cromwell	1375	1398	Died
Baron Cromwell (1375)	Ralph de Cromwell, 2nd Baron Cromwell	1398	1417	
Baron Clifton (1376)	Constantine de Clifton, 2nd Baron Clifton	1388	1395	Died, none of his heirs were summoned to Parliament in respect of this Barony
Baron Thorpe (1381)	William de Thorpe, 1st Baron Thorpe	1381	1390	Died, title extinct
Baron Camoys (1383)	Thomas de Camoys, 1st Baron Camoys	1383	1419	
Baron Falvesley (1383)	John de Falvesley, 1st Baron Falvesley	1383	1392	Died, title extinct
Baron Devereux (1383)	John Devereux, 1st Baron Devereux	1384	1393	Died
Baron Devereux (1383)	John Devereux, 2nd Baron Devereux	1393	1396	Died, title ceased
Baron Lumley (1384)	Ralph de Lumley, 1st Baron Lumley	1384	1400	
Baron Beauchamp of Kidderminster (1387)	John de Beauchamp, 2nd Baron Beauchamp	1388	1400	
Baron le Despencer (1387)	Philip le Despencer, 1st Baron le Despencer	1387	1401	
Baron Bergavenny (1392)	William de Beauchamp, 1st Baron Bergavenny	1392	1411	New creation
Baron Grey of Codnor (1397)	Richard Grey, 1st Baron Grey of Codnor	1397	1418	New creation

== Peerage of Scotland ==
Title	Holder	Date gained	Date lost	Notes
Duke of Rothesay (1398)	David Stewart, Duke of Rothesay	1398	1402	New creation; Earl of Carrick in 1390
Duke of Albany (1398)	Robert Stewart, Duke of Albany	1398	1420	New creation
Earl of Mar (1114)	Margaret, Countess of Mar	1377	1393	Died
Earl of Mar (1114)	Isabel Douglas, Countess of Mar	1393	1408	
Earl of Dunbar (1115)	George I, Earl of March	1368	1420	
Earl of Fife (1129)	Robert Stewart, Earl of Fife	1371	1420	Created Duke of Albany, see above
Earl of Menteith (1160)	Margaret Graham, Countess of Menteith	1360	1390	Died
Earl of Menteith (1160)	Murdoch Stewart, Earl of Menteith	1390	1425	
Earl of Lennox (1184)	Donnchadh, Earl of Lennox	1385	1425	
Earl of Ross (1215)	Euphemia I, Countess of Ross	1372	1394	Died
Earl of Ross (1215)	Alexander Leslie, Earl of Ross	1394	1402	
Earl of Sutherland (1235)	Robert de Moravia, 6th Earl of Sutherland	1370	1427	
Earl of Douglas (1358)	Archibald Douglas, 3rd Earl of Douglas	1388	1400	
Earl of Carrick (1368)	John Stewart, Earl of Carrick	1368	1390	Succeeded to the Throne, and the Earldom merged into Crown
Earl of Strathearn (1371)	Euphemia Stewart, Countess of Strathearn	1386	1410	
Earl of Moray (1372)	John Dunbar, Earl of Moray	1372	1391	Died
Earl of Moray (1372)	Thomas Dunbar, 5th Earl of Moray	1391	1422	
Earl of Orkney (1379)	Henry I Sinclair, Earl of Orkney	1379	1400	
Earl of Buchan (1382)	Alexander Stewart, Earl of Buchan	1382	1404	
Earl of Angus (1389)	George Douglas, 1st Earl of Angus	1389	1403	
Earl of Crawford (1398)	David Lindsay, 1st Earl of Crawford	1398	1407	New creation

== Peerage of Ireland ==
Title	Holder	Date gained	Date lost	Notes
Earl of Ulster (1264)	Roger Mortimer, 6th Earl of Ulster	1382	1398	Died
Earl of Ulster (1264)	Edmund Mortimer, 7th Earl of Ulster	1398	1425	
Earl of Kildare (1316)	Maurice FitzGerald, 4th Earl of Kildare	1329	1390	Died
Earl of Kildare (1316)	Gerald FitzGerald, 5th Earl of Kildare	1390	1432	
Earl of Ormond (1328)	James Butler, 3rd Earl of Ormond	1382	1405	
Earl of Desmond (1329)	Gerald FitzGerald, 3rd Earl of Desmond	1358	1398	Died
Earl of Desmond (1329)	John FitzGerald, 4th Earl of Desmond	1398	1399	Died
Earl of Desmond (1329)	Thomas FitzGerald, 5th Earl of Desmond	1399	1420	
Earl of Cork (1396)	Edward of Norwich, 1st Earl of Cork	1396	1415	New creation
Baron Athenry (1172)	Walter de Bermingham	1374	1428	
Baron Kingsale (1223)	William de Courcy, 9th Baron Kingsale	1387	1410	
Baron Kerry (1223)	Maurice Fitzmaurice, 6th Baron Kerry	1348	1398	Died
Baron Kerry (1223)	Patrick Fitzmaurice, 7th Baron Kerry	1398	1410	
Baron Barry (1261)	David Barry, 6th Baron Barry	1347	1392	Died
Baron Barry (1261)	John Barry, 7th Baron Barry	1392	1420	
Baron Gormanston (1370)	Robert Preston, 1st Baron Gormanston	1370	1396	Died
Baron Gormanston (1370)	Christopher Preston, 2nd Baron Gormanston	1396	1422	
Baron Slane (1370)	Thomas Fleming, 2nd Baron Slane	1370	1435	

Preceded by List of peers 1380–1389	Lists of peers by decade 1390–1399	Succeeded by List of peers 1400–1409
