= List of peers 1380–1389 =

This page lists all peers who held extant titles between 1380 and 1389.

== Peerage of England ==
Title	Holder	Date gained	Date lost	Notes
Duke of Cornwall (1337)	None	1377	1399	
Duke of Lancaster (1362)	John of Gaunt, 1st Duke of Lancaster	1362	1399	
Duke of York (1385)	Edmund of Langley, 1st Duke of York	1385	1402	New creation
Duke of Gloucester (1385)	Thomas of Woodstock, 1st Duke of Gloucester	1385	1397	New creation
Duke of Ireland (1386)	Robert de Vere, Duke of Ireland	1386	1388	9th Earl of Oxford; Marquess of Dublin in 1386, letters patent cancelled few months later; New creation; attainted, when all his honours became forfeit
Earl of Surrey (1088)	Richard FitzAlan, 9th Earl of Surrey	1376	1397	11th Earl of Arundel
Earl of Warwick (1088)	Thomas de Beauchamp, 12th Earl of Warwick	1369	1401	
Earl of Norfolk (1312)	Margaret, 2nd Countess of Norfolk	1375	1399	
Earl of Kent (1321)	Joan of Kent	1352	1385	Died, title extinct
Earl of March (1328)	Edmund Mortimer, 3rd Earl of March	1360	1381	Died
Earl of March (1328)	Roger Mortimer, 4th Earl of March	1381	1398	
Earl of Devon (1335)	Edward de Courtenay, 3rd Earl of Devon	1377	1419	
Earl of Salisbury (1337)	William de Montacute, 2nd Earl of Salisbury	1344	1397	
Earl of Suffolk (1337)	William de Ufford, 2nd Earl of Suffolk	1369	1382	Died, title extinct
Earl of Pembroke (1339)	John Hastings, 3rd Earl of Pembroke	1375	1389	Died, title extinct
Earl of Stafford (1351)	Hugh de Stafford, 2nd Earl of Stafford	1372	1386	Died
Earl of Stafford (1351)	Thomas Stafford, 3rd Earl of Stafford	1386	1392	
Earl of Kent (1360)	Thomas Holland, 2nd Earl of Kent	1360	1397	
Earl of Cambridge (1362)	Edmund of Langley, 1st Earl of Cambridge	1362	1402	Created Duke of York, see above
Earl of Richmond (1372)	John V, Duke of Brittany	1372	1399	
Earl of Buckingham (1377)	Thomas of Woodstock, 1st Earl of Buckingham	1377	1397	Created Duke of Gloucester, see above
Earl of Nottingham (1377)	John de Mowbray, 1st Earl of Nottingham	1377	1382	Died, title extinct
Earl of Northumberland (1377)	Henry Percy, 1st Earl of Northumberland	1377	1406	
Earl of Nottingham (1383)	Thomas de Mowbray, 1st Earl of Nottingham	1383	1399	New creation
Earl of Suffolk (1385)	Michael de la Pole, 1st Earl of Suffolk	1385	1388	New creation; cr. Baron de la Pole in 1384; found guilty of high treason, and all his honours became forfeited
Earl of Huntingdon (1387)	John Holland, 1st Earl of Huntingdon	1388	1400	New creation
Baron de Ros (1264)	Thomas de Ros, 4th Baron de Ros	1353	1383	Died
Baron de Ros (1264)	John de Ros, 5th Baron de Ros	1383	1394	
Baron le Despencer (1264)	none	1326	1398	Attainted
Baron Basset of Drayton (1264)	Ralph Basset, 4th Baron Basset of Drayton	1344	1390	
Baron Berkeley (1295)	Thomas de Berkeley, 5th Baron Berkeley	1368	1418	
Baron Fauconberg (1295)	Thomas de Fauconberg, 5th Baron Fauconberg	1362	1407	
Baron FitzWalter (1295)	Walter FitzWalter, 4th Baron FitzWalter	1361	1386	Died
Baron FitzWalter (1295)	Walter FitzWalter, 5th Baron FitzWalter	1386	1406	
Baron FitzWarine (1295)	Fulke FitzWarine, 5th Baron FitzWarine	1377	1391	
Baron Grey de Wilton (1295)	Henry Grey, 5th Baron Grey de Wilton	1370	1396	
Baron Mauley (1295)	Peter de Mauley, 3rd Baron Mauley	1355	1383	Died
Baron Mauley (1295)	Peter de Mauley, 4th Baron Mauley	1383	1415	
Baron Neville de Raby (1295)	John Neville, 3rd Baron Neville de Raby	1367	1388	Died
Baron Neville de Raby (1295)	Ralph Neville, 4th Baron Neville de Raby	1388	1425	
Baron Umfraville (1295)	Gilbert de Umfraville, 3rd Baron Umfraville	1325	1381	Died; Peerage became dormant; and in abeyance since 1421
Baron Bardolf (1299)	William Bardolf, 4th Baron Bardolf	1363	1385	Died
Baron Bardolf (1299)	Thomas Bardolf, 5th Baron Bardolf	1385	1407	
Baron Clinton (1299)	John de Clinton, 3rd Baron Clinton	1335	1398	
Baron De La Warr (1299)	John la Warr, 4th Baron De La Warr	1370	1398	
Baron Ferrers of Chartley (1299)	Robert de Ferrers, 5th Baron Ferrers of Chartley	1367	1416	
Baron Lovel (1299)	John Lovel, 5th Baron Lovel	1361	1408	
Baron Scales (1299)	Roger de Scales, 4th Baron Scales	1369	1386	Died
Baron Scales (1299)	Robert de Scales, 5th Baron Scales	1386	1402	
Baron Tregoz (1299)	Thomas de Tregoz, 3rd Baron Tregoz	1322	1405	
Baron Welles (1299)	John de Welles, 5th Baron Welles	1361	1421	
Baron de Clifford (1299)	Roger de Clifford, 5th Baron de Clifford	1350	1389	Died
Baron de Clifford (1299)	Thomas de Clifford, 6th Baron de Clifford	1389	1391-3	
Baron Ferrers of Groby (1299)	Henry Ferrers, 4th Baron Ferrers of Groby	1372	1388	Died
Baron Ferrers of Groby (1299)	William Ferrers, 5th Baron Ferrers of Groby	1388	1445	
Baron Furnivall (1299)	William de Furnivall, 4th Baron Furnivall	1364	1383	Died
Baron Furnivall (1299)	Joane de Furnivall, suo jure Baroness Furnivall	1383	1407	
Baron Latimer (1299)	William Latimer, 4th Baron Latimer	1335	1381	Died
Baron Latimer (1299)	Elizabeth Latimer, suo jure Baroness Latimer	1381	1395	
Baron Morley (1299)	Thomas de Morley, 4th Baron Morley	1379	1416	
Baron Strange of Knockyn (1299)	Roger le Strange, 5th Baron Strange of Knockyn	1349	1381	Died
Baron Strange of Knockyn (1299)	John le Strange, 6th Baron Strange of Knockyn	1381	1397	
Baron Botetourt (1305)	John de Botetourt, 2nd Baron Botetourt	1324	1385	Died
Baron Botetourt (1305)	Joan de Botetourt, suo jure Baroness Botetourt	1385	1406	
Baron Boteler of Wemme (1308)	Elizabeth Le Boteler, de jure Baroness Boteler of Wemme	1361	1411	
Baron Zouche of Haryngworth (1308)	William la Zouche, 2nd Baron Zouche	1352	1382	Died
Baron Zouche of Haryngworth (1308)	William la Zouche, 3rd Baron Zouche	1382	1396	
Baron Beaumont (1309)	John Beaumont, 4th Baron Beaumont	1369	1396	
Baron Monthermer (1309)	Margaret de Monthermer, suo jure Baroness Monthermer	1340	1390	
Baron Strange of Blackmere (1309)	Elizabeth le Strange, suo jure Baroness Strange of Blackmere	1375	1383	
Baron Strange of Blackmere (1309)	Ankaret Lestrangee, suo jure Baroness Strange of Blackmere	1383	1413	
Baron Lisle (1311)	Robert de Lisle, 3rd Baron Lisle	1356	1399	
Baron Audley of Heleigh (1313)	James de Audley, 2nd Baron Audley of Heleigh	1316	1386	Died
Baron Audley of Heleigh (1313)	Nicholas de Audley, 3rd Baron Audley of Heleigh	1386	1391	
Baron Cobham of Kent (1313)	John de Cobham, 3rd Baron Cobham of Kent	1355	1408	
Baron Saint Amand (1313)	Almaric de St Amand, 2nd Baron Saint Amand	1330	1382	Died
Baron Saint Amand (1313)	Almaric de St Amand, 3rd Baron Saint Amand	1382	1402	
Baron Cherleton (1313)	John Cherleton, 4th Baron Cherleton	1374	1401	
Baron Say (1313)	John de Say, 4th Baron Say	1375	1382	Died
Baron Say (1313)	Elizabeth de Say, suo jure Baroness Say	1382	1399	
Baron Willoughby de Eresby (1313)	Robert Willoughby, 4th Baron Willoughby de Eresby	1372	1396	
Baron Holand (1314)	Maud de Holland, suo jure Baroness Holand	1373	1420	
Baron Dacre (1321)	Hugh Dacre, 4th Baron Dacre	1375	1383	Died
Baron Dacre (1321)	William Dacre, 5th Baron Dacre	1383	1398	
Baron FitzHugh (1321)	Hugh FitzHugh, 2nd Baron FitzHugh	1356	1386	Died
Baron FitzHugh (1321)	Henry FitzHugh, 3rd Baron FitzHugh	1386	1425	
Baron Greystock (1321)	Ralph de Greystock, 3rd Baron Greystock	1358	1417	
Baron Grey of Ruthin (1325)	Reginald Grey, 2nd Baron Grey de Ruthyn	1353	1388	Died
Baron Grey of Ruthin (1325)	Reginald Grey, 3rd Baron Grey de Ruthyn	1388	1441	
Baron Harington (1326)	Robert Harington, 3rd Baron Harington	1363	1406	
Baron Burghersh (1330)	Elizabeth de Burghersh, 3rd Baroness Burghersh	1369	1409	
Baron Maltravers (1330)	Eleanor Maltravers, 2nd Baroness Maltravers	1377	1405	
Baron Darcy de Knayth (1332)	Philip Darcy, 4th Baron Darcy de Knayth	1362	1398	
Baron Talbot (1332)	Gilbert Talbot, 3rd Baron Talbot	1356	1387	Died
Baron Talbot (1332)	Richard Talbot, 4th Baron Talbot	1387	1396	
Baron Leyburn (1337)	John de Leyburn, 1st Baron Leyburn	1337	1384	Died, title extinct
Baron Poynings (1337)	Richard Poynings, 4th Baron Poynings	1375	1387	Died
Baron Poynings (1337)	Robert Poynings, 5th Baron Poynings	1387	1446	
Baron Grey of Rotherfield (1330)	Robert de Grey, 4th Baron Grey of Rotherfield	1376	1388	Died, Barony dormant
Baron Cobham of Sterborough (1342)	Reginald de Cobham, 2nd Baron Cobham of Sterborough	1361	1403	
Baron Bourchier (1342)	John Bourchier, 2nd Baron Bourchier	1349	1400	
Baron Manny (1347)	Anne Manny, 2nd Baroness Manny	1371	1384	Title succeeded by the Earl of Pembroke, and extinct in 1389
Baron Bryan (1350)	Guy Bryan, 1st Baron Bryan	1350	1390	
Baron Burnell (1350)	Nicholas Burnell, 1st Baron Burnell	1350	1383	Died
Baron Burnell (1350)	Hugh Burnell, 2nd Baron Burnell	1383	1420	
Baron Scrope of Masham (1350)	Henry Scrope, 1st Baron Scrope of Masham	1350	1391	
Baron Musgrave (1350)	Thomas Musgrave, 1st Baron Musgrave	1350	1382	Died, title considered as forfeited
Baron Saint Maur (1351)	Richard St Maur, 3rd Baron Saint Maur	1361	1401	
Baron le Despencer (1357)	Thomas le Despenser, 2nd Baron le Despencer	1375	1400	
Baron Lisle (1357)	Warine de Lisle, 2nd Baron Lisle	1360	1382	Died
Baron Lisle (1357)	Margaret de Lisle, 3rd Baroness Lisle	1382	1392	
Baron Montacute (1357)	John de Montacute, 1st Baron Montacute	1357	1400	Succeeded as Earl of Salisbury in 1397, see above
Baron Beauchamp of Bletso (1363)	Roger Beauchamp, 1st Baron Beauchamp of Bletso	1363	1380	Died, none of his heirs were summoned to Parliament in respect of this Barony
Baron Botreaux (1368)	William de Botreaux, 1st Baron Botreaux	1368	1391	
Baron Aldeburgh (1371)	William de Aldeburgh, 1st Baron Aldeburgh	1371	1388	Died, none of his heirs were summoned to Parliament in respect of this Barony
Baron Scrope of Bolton (1371)	Richard le Scrope, 1st Baron Scrope of Bolton	1371	1403	
Baron Cromwell (1375)	Ralph de Cromwell, 1st Baron Cromwell	1375	1398	
Baron Clifton (1376)	John de Clifton, 1st Baron Clifton	1376	1388	Died
Baron Clifton (1376)	Constantine de Clifton, 2nd Baron Clifton	1388	1395	
Baron Thorpe (1381)	William de Thorpe, 1st Baron Thorpe	1381	1390	New creation
Baron Windsor (1381)	William de Windsor, 1st Baron Windsor	1381	1384	New creation; died, title extinct
Baron Camoys (1383)	Thomas de Camoys, 1st Baron Camoys	1383	1419	New creation
Baron Falvesley (1383)	John de Falvesley, 1st Baron Falvesley	1383	1392	New creation
Baron Devereux (1384)	John Devereux, 1st Baron Devereux	1384	1393	New creation
Baron Lumley (1384)	Ralph de Lumley, 1st Baron Lumley	1384	1400	New creation
Baron Beauchamp of Kidderminster (1387)	John de Beauchamp, 1st Baron Beauchamp	1387	1388	New creation; first peerage creation by letters patent ever; died
Baron Beauchamp of Kidderminster (1387)	John de Beauchamp, 2nd Baron Beauchamp	1388	1400	
Baron le Despencer (1387)	Philip le Despencer, 1st Baron le Despencer	1387	1401	New creation

== Peerage of Scotland ==
Title	Holder	Date gained	Date lost	Notes
Earl of Mar (1114)	Margaret, Countess of Mar	1377	1393	
Earl of Dunbar (1115)	George I, Earl of March	1368	1420	
Earl of Fife (1129)	Robert Stewart, Earl of Fife	1371	1420	
Earl of Menteith (1160)	Margaret Graham, Countess of Menteith	1360	1390	
Earl of Lennox (1184)	Margaret, Countess of Lennox	1373	1385	Died
Earl of Lennox (1184)	Donnchadh, Earl of Lennox	1385	1425	
Earl of Ross (1215)	Euphemia I, Countess of Ross	1372	1394	
Earl of Sutherland (1235)	Robert de Moravia, 6th Earl of Sutherland	1370	1427	
Earl of Angus (1330)	Margaret Stewart, Countess of Angus	1361	1389	Resigned Earldom
Earl of Douglas (1358)	William Douglas, 1st Earl of Douglas	1358	1384	Died
Earl of Douglas (1358)	James Douglas, 2nd Earl of Douglas	1384	1388	Died
Earl of Douglas (1358)	Archibald Douglas, 3rd Earl of Douglas	1388	1400	
Earl of Carrick (1368)	John Stewart, Earl of Carrick	1368	1390	
Earl of Strathearn (1371)	David Stewart, Earl of Strathearn	1371	1386	Died
Earl of Strathearn (1371)	Euphemia Stewart, Countess of Strathearn	1386	1410	
Earl of Moray (1372)	John Dunbar, Earl of Moray	1372	1391	
Earl of Orkney (1379)	Henry I Sinclair, Earl of Orkney	1379	1400	
Earl of Buchan (1382)	Alexander Stewart, Earl of Buchan	1382	1404	New creation
Earl of Angus (1389)	George Douglas, 1st Earl of Angus	1389	1403	New creation

== Peerage of Ireland ==
Title	Holder	Date gained	Date lost	Notes
Earl of Ulster (1264)	Philippa, 5th Countess of Ulster	1363	1382	Died
Earl of Ulster (1264)	Roger Mortimer, 6th Earl of Ulster	1382	1398	
Earl of Kildare (1316)	Maurice FitzGerald, 4th Earl of Kildare	1329	1390	
Earl of Ormond (1328)	James Butler, 2nd Earl of Ormond	1338	1382	Died
Earl of Ormond (1328)	James Butler, 3rd Earl of Ormond	1382	1405	
Earl of Desmond (1329)	Gerald FitzGerald, 3rd Earl of Desmond	1358	1398	
Baron Athenry (1172)	Walter de Bermingham	1374	1428	
Baron Kingsale (1223)	John de Courcy, 8th Baron Kingsale	1358	1387	Died
Baron Kingsale (1223)	William de Courcy, 9th Baron Kingsale	1387	1410	
Baron Kerry (1223)	Maurice Fitzmaurice, 6th Baron Kerry	1348	1398	
Baron Barry (1261)	David Barry, 6th Baron Barry	1347	1392	
Baron Gormanston (1370)	Robert Preston, 1st Baron Gormanston	1370	1396	
Baron Slane (1370)	Thomas Fleming, 2nd Baron Slane	1370	1435	

Preceded by List of peers 1370–1379	Lists of peers by decade 1380–1389	Succeeded by List of peers 1390–1399
