= List of peers 1400–1409 =

This page lists all peers who held extant titles between 1400 and 1409.

== Peerage of England ==
Title	Holder	Date gained	Date lost	Notes
Duke of Cornwall (1337)	Henry of Monmouth	1399	1413	1st Duke of Lancaster
Duke of York (1385)	Edmund of Langley, 1st Duke of York	1385	1402	Died
Duke of York (1385)	Edward of Norwich, 2nd Duke of York	1402	1415	
Duke of Norfolk (1397)	none	1399	1424	(Deprived of the title)
Earl of Surrey (1088)	Thomas FitzAlan, 10th Earl of Surrey	1400	1415	12th Earl of Arundel; restored
Earl of Warwick (1088)	Thomas de Beauchamp, 12th Earl of Warwick	1369	1401	Died
Earl of Warwick (1088)	Richard de Beauchamp, 13th Earl of Warwick	1401	1439	
Earl of Oxford (1142)	Aubrey de Vere, 10th Earl of Oxford	1392	1400	Died
Earl of Oxford (1142)	Richard de Vere, 11th Earl of Oxford	1400	1417	
Earl of Norfolk (1312)	Thomas de Mowbray, 3rd Earl of Norfolk	1399	1400	Died
Earl of Norfolk (1312)	Thomas de Mowbray, 4th Earl of Norfolk	1400	1405	Died
Earl of Norfolk (1312)	John de Mowbray, 5th Earl of Norfolk	1405	1432	
Earl of March (1328)	Edmund Mortimer, 5th Earl of March	1398	1425	
Earl of Devon (1335)	Edward de Courtenay, 3rd Earl of Devon	1377	1419	
Earl of Salisbury (1337)	John Montacute, 3rd Earl of Salisbury	1397	1400	
Earl of Salisbury (1337)	none	1400	1409	Attainted
Earl of Salisbury (1337)	Thomas Montacute, 4th Earl of Salisbury	1409	1428	
Earl of Stafford (1351)	Edmund Stafford, 5th Earl of Stafford	1395	1403	Died
Earl of Stafford (1351)	Humphrey Stafford, 6th Earl of Stafford	1403	1460	
Earl of Kent (1360)	Thomas Holland, 3rd Earl of Kent	1397	1400	Died
Earl of Kent (1360)	Edmund Holland, 4th Earl of Kent	1400	1408	Died, title extinct
Earl of Northumberland (1377)	Henry Percy, 1st Earl of Northumberland	1377	1406	Attainted and his honours became forfeited
Earl of Suffolk (1385)	Michael de la Pole, 2nd Earl of Suffolk	1399	1415	
Earl of Somerset (1397)	John Beaufort, 1st Earl of Somerset	1397	1410	
Earl of Westmorland (1397)	Ralph Neville, 1st Earl of Westmorland	1397	1425	
Earl of Worcester (1397)	Thomas Percy, 1st Earl of Worcester	1397	1403	Attainted
Baron de Ros (1264)	William de Ros, 6th Baron de Ros	1393	1414	
Baron le Despencer (1264)	Thomas le Despencer, 6th Baron Despencer	1397	1400	Attainted, and remained under attainder until 1604
Baron Berkeley (1295)	Thomas de Berkeley, 5th Baron Berkeley	1368	1418	
Baron Fauconberg (1295)	Thomas de Fauconberg, 5th Baron Fauconberg	1362	1407	Died, Barony fell into abeyance
Baron FitzWalter (1295)	Walter FitzWalter, 5th Baron FitzWalter	1386	1406	Died
Baron FitzWalter (1295)	Humphrey FitzWalter, 6th Baron FitzWalter	1406	1415	
Baron FitzWarin (1295)	Fulk FitzWarin, 6th Baron FitzWarin	1391	1407	Died
Baron FitzWarin (1295)	Fulk FitzWarin, 7th Baron FitzWarin	1407	1420	
Baron Grey de Wilton (1295)	Richard Grey, 6th Baron Grey de Wilton	1396	1442	
Baron Mauley (1295)	Peter de Mauley, 4th Baron Mauley	1383	1415	
Baron Bardolf (1299)	Thomas Bardolf, 5th Baron Bardolf	1385	1407	Attainted, and his peerage became forfeited
Baron Clinton (1299)	William de Clinton, 4th Baron Clinton	1398	1431	
Baron De La Warr (1299)	Thomas la Warr, 5th Baron De La Warr	1398	1427	
Baron Ferrers of Chartley (1299)	Robert de Ferrers, 5th Baron Ferrers of Chartley	1367	1416	
Baron Lovel (1299)	John Lovel, 5th Baron Lovel	1361	1408	Died
Baron Lovel (1299)	John Lovel, 6th Baron Lovel	1408	1414	
Baron Scales (1299)	Robert de Scales, 5th Baron Scales	1386	1402	Died
Baron Scales (1299)	Robert de Scales, 6th Baron Scales	1402	1419	
Baron Tregoz (1299)	Thomas de Tregoz, 3rd Baron Tregoz	1322	1405	died. The peerage became dormant(?).
Baron Welles (1299)	John de Welles, 5th Baron Welles	1361	1421	
Baron de Clifford (1299)	John de Clifford, 7th Baron de Clifford	1391-3	1422	
Baron Ferrers of Groby (1299)	William Ferrers, 5th Baron Ferrers of Groby	1388	1445	
Baron Furnivall (1299)	Joane de Furnivall, suo jure Baroness Furnivall	1383	1407	Died
Baron Furnivall (1299)	John Talbot, 6th Baron Furnivall	1407	1453	jure uxoris
Baron Latimer (1299)	John Nevill, 6th Baron Latimer	1395	1430	
Baron Morley (1299)	Thomas de Morley, 4th Baron Morley	1379	1416	
Baron Strange of Knockyn (1299)	Richard le Strange, 7th Baron Strange of Knockyn	1397	1449	
Baron Botetourt (1305)	Joan de Botetourt, suo jure Baroness Botetourt	1385	1406	Died, Barony fell into abeyance until 1764
Baron Boteler of Wemme (1308)	Elizabeth Le Boteler, de jure Baroness Boteler of Wemme	1361	1411	
Baron Zouche of Haryngworth (1308)	William la Zouche, 4th Baron Zouche	1396	1415	
Baron Beaumont (1309)	Henry Beaumont, 5th Baron Beaumont	1396	1413	
Baron Strange of Blackmere (1309)	Ankaret Lestrangee, suo jure Baroness Strange of Blackmere	1383	1413	
Baron Audley of Heleigh (1313)	in abeyance	1391	1405	
Baron Audley of Heleigh (1313)	John Tuchet, 4th Baron Audley	1405	1408	Summoned as Baron Tuchet in 1403, both titles held by his heirs; died
Baron Audley of Heleigh (1313)	James Tuchet, 5th Baron Audley	1408	1459	
Baron Cobham of Kent (1313)	John de Cobham, 3rd Baron Cobham	1355	1408	Died
Baron Cobham of Kent (1313)	Joan Oldcastle, 4th Baroness Cobham	1408	1434	
Baron St Amand (1313)	Amaury de St Amand, 3rd Baron St Amand	1382	1402	Died, Barony fell into abeyance
Baron Cherleton (1313)	John Cherleton, 4th Baron Cherleton	1374	1401	Died
Baron Cherleton (1313)	Edward Cherleton, 5th Baron Cherleton	1401	1421	
Baron Willoughby de Eresby (1313)	William Willoughby, 5th Baron Willoughby de Eresby	1396	1409	Died
Baron Willoughby de Eresby (1313)	Robert Willoughby, 6th Baron Willoughby de Eresby	1409	1452	
Baron Holand (1314)	Maud de Holland, suo jure Baroness Holand	1373	1420	
Baron Dacre (1321)	Thomas Dacre, 6th Baron Dacre	1398	1458	
Baron FitzHugh (1321)	Henry FitzHugh, 3rd Baron FitzHugh	1386	1425	
Baron Greystock (1321)	Ralph de Greystock, 3rd Baron Greystock	1358	1417	
Baron Grey of Ruthyn (1325)	Reginald Grey, 3rd Baron Grey de Ruthyn	1388	1441	
Baron Harington (1326)	Robert Harington, 3rd Baron Harington	1363	1406	Died
Baron Harington (1326)	John Harington, 4th Baron Harington	1406	1418	
Baron Burghersh (1330)	Elizabeth de Burghersh, 3rd Baroness Burghersh	1369	1402	Died
Baron Burghersh (1330)	none	1402	1409	Attainder of the Earl of Gloucester of the le Despenser family
Baron Burghersh (1330)	Richard le Despenser, 4th Baron Burghersh	1409	1414	
Baron Maltravers (1330)	Eleanor Maltravers, 2nd Baroness Maltravers	1377	1405	Died
Baron Maltravers (1330)	John Fitzalan, 3rd Baron Maltraveres	1405	1421	
Baron Darcy de Knayth (1332)	John Darcy, 5th Baron Darcy de Knayth	1398	1411	
Baron Talbot (1332)	Gilbert Talbot, 5th Baron Talbot	1396	1419	
Baron Poynings (1337)	Robert Poynings, 5th Baron Poynings	1387	1446	
Baron Cobham of Sterborough (1342)	Reginald de Cobham, 2nd Baron Cobham of Sterborough	1361	1403	Died, none of his heirs were summoned to Parliament in respect of this Barony
Baron Bourchier (1342)	John Bourchier, 2nd Baron Bourchier	1349	1400	Died
Baron Bourchier (1342)	Bartholomew Bourchier, 3rd Baron Bourchier	1400	1409	Died
Baron Bourchier (1342)	Elizabeth Bourchier, suo jure Baroness Bourchier	1409	1433	
Baron Burnell (1350)	Hugh Burnell, 2nd Baron Burnell	1383	1420	
Baron Scrope of Masham (1350)	Stephen Scrope, 2nd Baron Scrope of Masham	1391	1406	Died
Baron Scrope of Masham (1350)	Henry Scrope, 3rd Baron Scrope of Masham	1406	1415	
Baron St Maur (1351)	Richard St Maur, 3rd Baron St Maur	1361	1401	Died
Baron St Maur (1351)	Richard St Maur, 4th Baron St Maur	1401	1409	Died
Baron St Maur (1351)	Alice St Maur, suo jure Baroness St Maur	1409	1426	
Baron Lisle (1357)	Elizabeth de Berkeley, 4th Baroness Lisle	1392	1420	
Baron Botreaux (1368)	William de Botreaux, 3rd Baron Botreaux	1392	1462	
Baron Scrope of Bolton (1371)	Richard Scrope, 1st Baron Scrope of Bolton	1371	1403	Died
Baron Scrope of Bolton (1371)	Roger Scrope, 2nd Baron Scrope of Bolton	1403	1403	Died
Baron Scrope of Bolton (1371)	Richard Scrope, 3rd Baron Scrope of Bolton	1403	1420	
Baron Cromwell (1375)	Ralph de Cromwell, 2nd Baron Cromwell	1398	1417	
Baron Camoys (1383)	Thomas de Camoys, 1st Baron Camoys	1383	1419	
Baron Lumley (1384)	Ralph de Lumley, 1st Baron Lumley	1384	1400	Attainted and his peerage became forfeited
Baron Beauchamp of Kidderminster (1387)	John de Beauchamp, 2nd Baron Beauchamp	1388	1400	Died, Barony extinct
Baron le Despencer (1387)	Philip le Despencer, 1st Baron le Despencer	1387	1401	Died
Baron le Despencer (1387)	Philip le Despencer, 2nd Baron le Despencer	1401	1424	
Baron Bergavenny (1392)	William de Beauchamp, 1st Baron Bergavenny	1392	1411	
Baron Grey of Codnor (1397)	Richard Grey, 1st Baron Grey of Codnor	1397	1418	
Baron West (1402)	Thomas West, 1st Baron West	1402	1405	New creation; died
Baron West (1402)	Thomas West, 2nd Baron West	1405	1415	
Baron Oldcastle (1409)	John Oldcastle, 1st Baron Oldcastell	1409	1417	New creation (if so and not a version for his being summoned to parliament jure uxoris as Baron Cobham of Kent)

== Peerage of Scotland ==
Title	Holder	Date gained	Date lost	Notes
Duke of Rothesay (1398)	David Stewart, Duke of Rothesay	1398	1402	Died
Duke of Rothesay (1398)	James Stewart, Duke of Rothesay	1404	1406	Succeeded to the Throne
Duke of Albany (1398)	Robert Stewart, Duke of Albany	1398	1420	
Earl of Mar (1114)	Isabel Douglas, Countess of Mar	1393	1408	Died
Earl of Mar (1114)	Alexander Stewart, Earl of Mar	1408	1435	
Earl of Dunbar (1115)	George I, Earl of March	1368	1420	
Earl of Menteith (1160)	Murdoch Stewart, Earl of Menteith	1390	1425	
Earl of Lennox (1184)	Donnchadh, Earl of Lennox	1385	1425	
Earl of Ross (1215)	Alexander Leslie, Earl of Ross	1394	1402	
Earl of Ross (1215)	Euphemia II, Countess of Ross	1402	1415	
Earl of Sutherland (1235)	Robert de Moravia, 6th Earl of Sutherland	1370	1427	
Earl of Douglas (1358)	Archibald Douglas, 3rd Earl of Douglas	1388	1400	Died
Earl of Douglas (1358)	Archibald Douglas, 4th Earl of Douglas	1400	1424	
Earl of Strathearn (1371)	Euphemia Stewart, Countess of Strathearn	1386	1410	
Earl of Moray (1372)	Thomas Dunbar, 5th Earl of Moray	1391	1422	
Earl of Orkney (1379)	Henry I Sinclair, Earl of Orkney	1379	1400	Died
Earl of Orkney (1379)	Henry II Sinclair, Earl of Orkney	1379	1418	
Earl of Buchan (1382)	Alexander Stewart, Earl of Buchan	1382	1404	Died
Earl of Buchan (1382)	Robert Stewart, Duke of Albany	1404	1406	Resigned the Earldom in favour of his son
Earl of Buchan (1382)	John Stewart, Earl of Buchan	1406	1424	
Earl of Angus (1389)	George Douglas, 1st Earl of Angus	1389	1403	Died
Earl of Angus (1389)	William Douglas, 2nd Earl of Angus	1403	1437	
Earl of Crawford (1398)	David Lindsay, 1st Earl of Crawford	1398	1407	Died
Earl of Crawford (1398)	Alexander Lindsay, 2nd Earl of Crawford	1407	1439	
Earl of Atholl (1404)	Walter Stewart, Earl of Atholl	1404	1437	New creation

== Peerage of Ireland ==
Title	Holder	Date gained	Date lost	Notes
Earl of Ulster (1264)	Edmund Mortimer, 7th Earl of Ulster	1398	1425	
Earl of Kildare (1316)	Gerald FitzGerald, 5th Earl of Kildare	1390	1432	
Earl of Ormond (1328)	James Butler, 3rd Earl of Ormond	1382	1405	Died
Earl of Ormond (1328)	James Butler, 4th Earl of Ormond	1405	1452	
Earl of Desmond (1329)	Thomas FitzGerald, 5th Earl of Desmond	1399	1420	
Earl of Cork (1396)	Edward of Norwich, 1st Earl of Cork	1396	1415	
Baron Athenry (1172)	Walter de Bermingham	1374	1428	
Baron Kingsale (1223)	William de Courcy, 9th Baron Kingsale	1387	1410	
Baron Kerry (1223)	Patrick Fitzmaurice, 7th Baron Kerry	1398	1410	
Baron Barry (1261)	John Barry, 7th Baron Barry	1392	1420	
Baron Gormanston (1370)	Christopher Preston, 2nd Baron Gormanston	1396	1422	
Baron Slane (1370)	Thomas Fleming, 2nd Baron Slane	1370	1435	

Preceded by List of peers 1390–1399	Lists of peers by decade 1400–1409	Succeeded by List of peers 1410–1419
