= Ralph de Cromwell =

Ralph de Cromwell may refer to:

- Ralph de Cromwell, 1st Baron Cromwell (died 1398)
- Ralph de Cromwell, 2nd Baron Cromwell
- Ralph de Cromwell, 3rd Baron Cromwell (c. 1393–1456)
