= Robert Preston, 1st Baron Gormanston =

Irish judge and Baron

Robert Preston, 1st Baron Gormanston (died 1396) was an Anglo-Irish nobleman, statesman and judge of the fourteenth century. He held several senior judicial offices including, for a brief period, that of Lord Chancellor of Ireland. He was the founder of the leading Anglo-Irish Preston family whose titles included Viscount Gormanston and Viscount Tara.

== Background and early career ==
He was the son of Roger de Preston (died 1346) and his wife and niece Maud (or Matilda) de Preston. His father was the son of Adam de Preston, a wealthy merchant from Preston, Lancashire; the family came to Ireland in the early fourteenth century. Roger held several judicial offices including puisne justice of the Court of Common Pleas (Ireland). Robert is first heard of in 1346 when he inherited property in Preston. He followed his father into the legal profession, becoming Irish King's Serjeant about 1348 and Attorney General for Ireland in 1355, with a salary of 100 shillings a year.

== Law Officer ==
As the Crown's principal Law Officer his duties were onerous: in 1357 and 1358 he was ordered to accompany the Lord Justice of Ireland through Leinster and Munster, and to plead and defend pleas on behalf of the Crown. This assize lasted for almost 6 months, which must have seriously interfered with his private practice, although he did receive a salary of £29, which was then a very large sum, as well as his expenses. He became Chief Justice of the Irish Common Pleas in 1358, and held that office for 20 years. He was removed from office in 1378, "unless the King or Privy Council of Ireland order otherwise " but this was on his own petition.

In 1359-61 the English Crown was faced with a serious rebellion in Leinster led by the O'Byrne family and the MacMurrough-Kavanaghs. King Edward III appointed his second son Lionel of Antwerp as Lord Lieutenant of Ireland to put down the rebellion, in which task he was largely successful. Preston served as his lieutenant in the campaign and received a knighthood. He was created Baron Gormanston between 1365 and 1370. He had already been summoned to the Irish Parliament as Baron Kells, in right of his first wife, Margaret de Bermingham.

In 1367 he sat on a commission to inquire into what profits were due to the English Crown from the Exchequer of Ireland, and later the same year he sat on another commission to inquire into whether the manor of Rathkeale was held from the Crown.

Despite his close family ties (through his first wife) with the Bermingham family of Carbury, he suffered considerable losses during the Berminghams' private war in Counties Meath and Kildare in 1367-8 and was forced to garrison Carbury Castle. It is unclear if he played any part in the failed parley at Carbury in 1368 where the de Berminghams, in breach of the truce which had been agreed, imprisoned the Crown's representatives.

== Later career ==
Although he had evidently been anxious to retire as Chief Justice, in his later years he continued to hold high office: he was briefly Lord Chancellor in 1388, deputy Justiciar of Ireland in 1389, and he was appointed Chancellor of the Exchequer of Ireland in 1391.

He is believed to have owned a collection of legal and political works, including the controversial treatise Modus Tenendi Parliamentum (written c.1320), which stressed the crucial part played in Government by Parliament, and according to its critics, justified the deposition of the King. The collection passed to his son Christopher, the second Baron, who made a keen study of it. This became a cause of controversy in the political crisis of 1418-9, when the second Baron was accused of treason, largely because of his possession of the Modus .

His main residence, acquired through marriage, was Carbury, County Kildare; he purchased Gormanston, County Meath from the St Amand family in 1363.

His mother Maud owned property in her own right and purchased a site where she built a Dublin townhouse, located approximately on what is now Parliament Street in the city centre, in about 1360. It became known as Preston's Inn and was still called that in Elizabethan times.

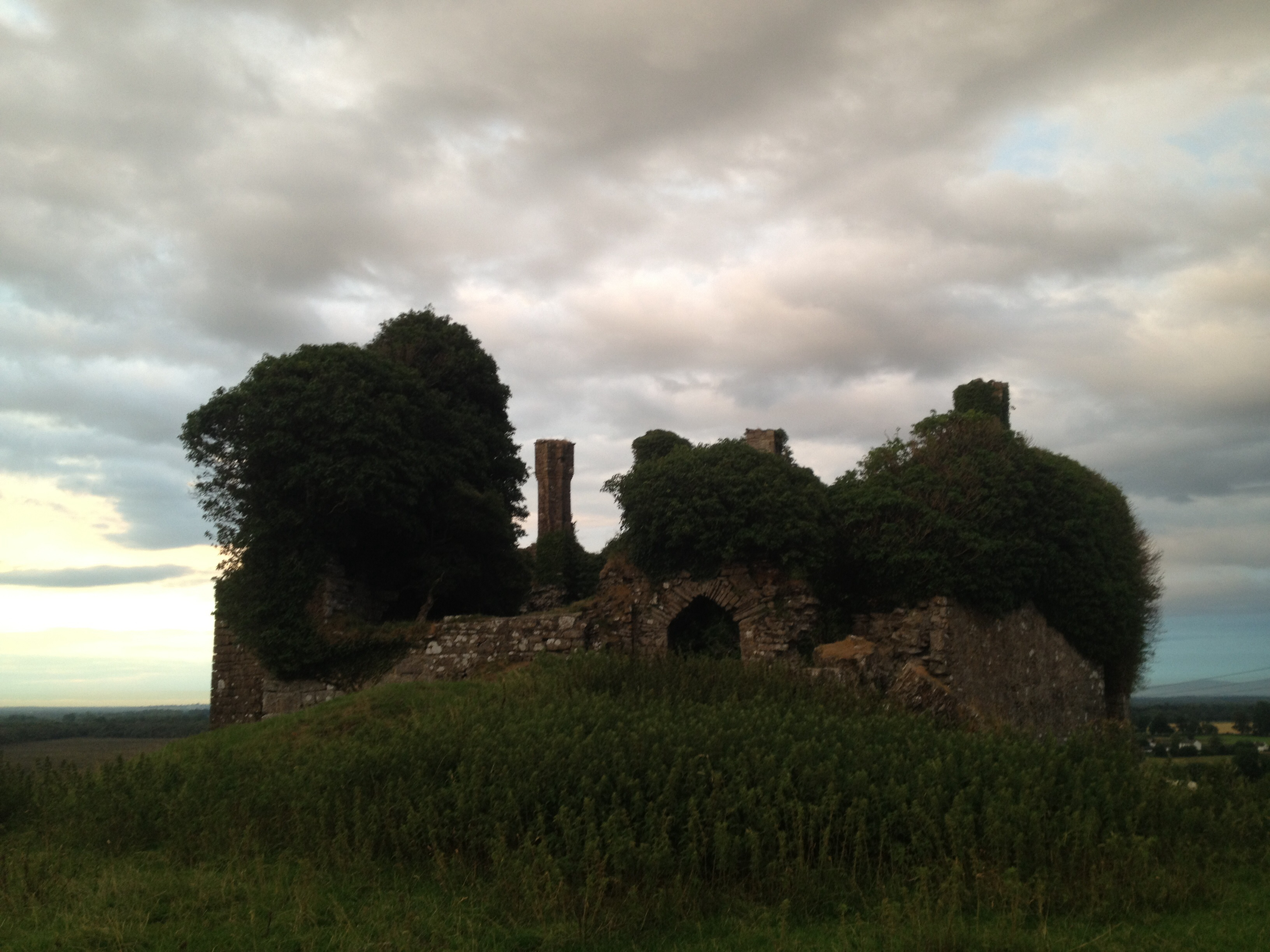
Carbury Castle Ruins

== Family ==
He married firstly Margaret de Bermingham, daughter and eventual heiress of Sir Walter de Bermingham, titular baron of Kells-in-Ossory, through which marriage he obtained Carbury Castle (which is now a ruin); he married secondly Joanna Hugely. On his death in 1396 he was succeeded by his son Christopher Preston, 2nd Baron Gormanston, who also adopted the title Baron Kells in right of his mother.

Peerage of Ireland
New creation	Baron Gormanston c.1365–1396	Succeeded by Christopher Preston
