= William de Botreaux, 2nd Baron Botreaux =

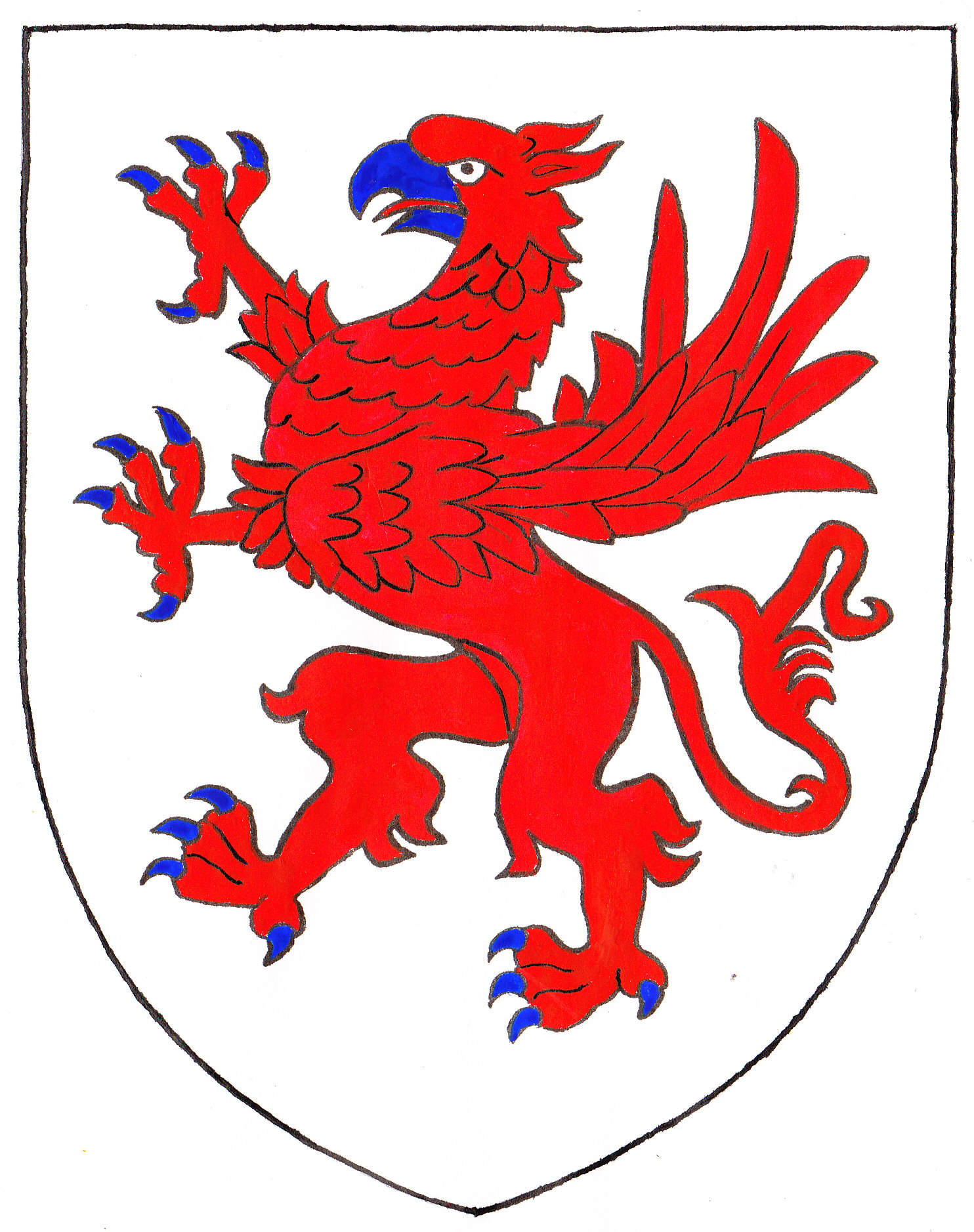
Armorials of Botreaux: Argent, a griffin segreant gules armed azure

William de Botreaux (1367–1395) (pronounced "But'ry") was a baron prominent in South-West Britain.

== Origins ==
He was the son of William de Botreaux, 1st Baron Botreaux (died 1391) and inherited his father's lands aged 24.

== Career ==
He received a writ of summons to attend parliament on 7 September 1391.

== Marriage ==
He married Elizabeth St. Lo daughter and co-heiress of Sir John St. Lo (Latinised to St. Laudo) of Newton St Loe, Wiltshire (now in Somerset), by his second wife Margaret Clyvedon, daughter and heiress of John Clyvedon. Elizabeth was sole heiress of her mother and survived her husband, her date of death having occurred on 4 September between 1409 and 1458.

== Death ==
He died on 25 May 1395.

== Progeny ==
He left the following progeny:

- William de Botreaux, 3rd Baron Botreaux (1388–1462)
- Alice de Botreaux, she married Fulk FitzWarin, 6th Baron FitzWarin and William Clinton, 4th Baron Clinton mother of John Clinton, 5th Baron Clinton

== Sources ==
- Cokayne, The Complete Peerage, new edition, vol 2, pp. 241–242

Peerage of England
Preceded by William de Botreaux	Baron Botreaux; 1391–1395	Succeeded by William de Botreaux
