= Modus Tenendi Parliamentum =

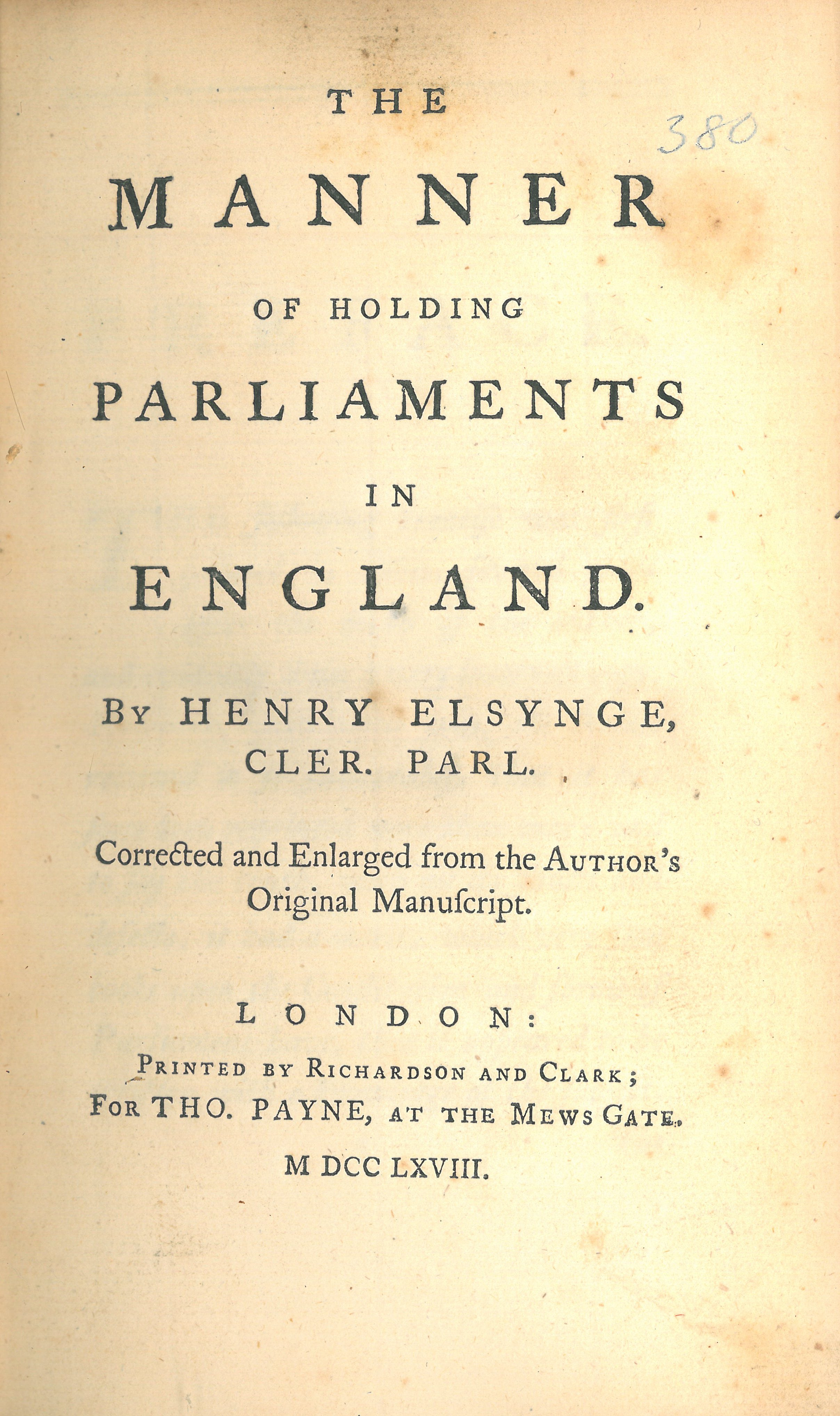
English translation by Henry Elsynge, 1768

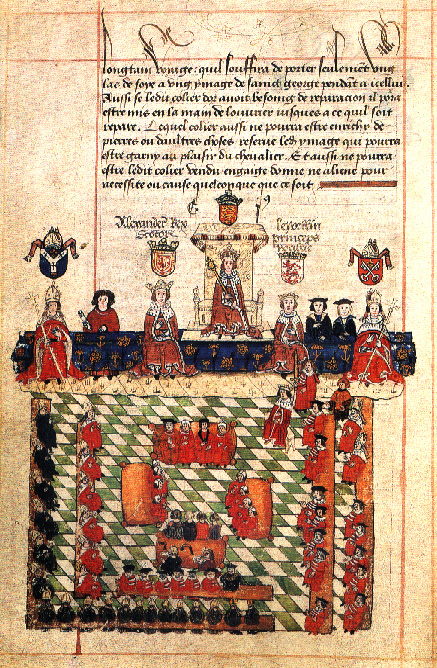
A 16th-century depiction of the Parliament of Edward I. The lords spiritual are seated to the king's right, the Lords Temporal to his left, and in the centre sit the justices and law officers.

The Modus Tenendi Parliamentum ('Method of Holding Parliaments') is a 14th-century Latin document that outlined an idealised version of English parliamentary procedure. Part of its significance lies in its very title: parliament was now "seen as both institutionally well defined and a proper subject for description and conscious reflection". However, it also includes fanciful elements, both in relation to the way it sets out the history of parliaments, and its aspirations for the roles of different groups in parliament.

== Provenance ==
An ancient document which has exercised much debate over its antiquity and authorship, the Modus is no longer seen as a later forgery, despite the doubts of earlier antiquaries, such as John Selden (1584–1654) and William Prynne (1600–1669). Thomas Duffus Hardy (1804–78) was a prominent historian and archivist, whose final position was senior assistant keeper of the Public Record Office. He edited the most complete version of the volume in 1846, and believed it was probably written "some time between the years 1294 and 1327", at or shortly after Edward I's Model Parliament of 1295. Writing in 1934, William A Morris reviewed the conflicting views on the date of the Modus that were first offered in the seventeenth century and concluded that it must have been written during the reign of Edward II (r. 1307–1327), probably 1321. M. V. Clarke says the book "was written in 1322 in order to expound and define the parliamentary theory and practice upheld by moderate men of that time". That view on the date is also supported by W. C. Weber. References within the Modus suggest that the writer had experience of parliament, as well as an understanding of the royal administration. V. H. Galbraith believed that someone who had such experience was the Yorkshireman, William Ayermin (d. 1336). Ayermin held a number of offices in the church and royal administration, including being Keeper of the Rolls of Chancery from 1316–24 and almost certainly also clerk of the parliament.

== Significance ==
The significance of the Modus lies in its descriptions of the procedures and organisation of Parliament and the growing importance of the Commons. Parliament had developed by the early 14th century to the point where it could promote the transmission of the Crown's policies and intentions in a positive manner outwards from the centre, and representation was the best method of doing this; notably, the Commons were more representative than magnates or prelates, who only represented themselves or the interests of the Catholic Church. Increasingly, the agreement of the Commons was necessary for the levy of all taxes: peers could give such consent personally, whereas the Commons were proxies for the bulk of the population. During the reign of Richard II, prominent members of the House of Lancaster wished to play up the importance of the Commons, compared to that of the Lords, prelates and magnates, and to legitimate processes in the Commons to depose a king who had lost the support of the people. The Modus was helpful to them in its emphasis on the representative power of the Commons: "We must understand that two Knights which come to the Parliament for the Shires and County out of which they come have a greater voice in Parliament to grant, than the greatest Earl in England". Maddicott offers a concise summary of the document's significance: "About the precise functions and powers of the commons the author of the Modus was, so far as we can see, often wrong. But about their general weight and position he was not so far out ... It is not hard to envisage the sort of body which it had in mind playing its part in the deposition of a king".

In a major political crisis in Ireland in 1418–19, the veteran statesman Christopher Preston, 2nd Baron Gormanston, was accused of treason, largely on account of his ownership of a copy of the document. He was quickly released and restored to favour, apparently after explaining that he had simply found it among his father's papers and thought it worth keeping. This copy was itself copied onto the patent roll of the Irish Chancery.

== See also ==
- Constitution of the United Kingdom
- House of Commons of England
- House of Lords of England
- House of Plantagenet

== Bibliography ==
- Galbraith, Vivian Hunter (1953). "The Modus Tenendi Parliamentum". Journal of the Warburg and Courtauld Institutes. 16 (1/2): 81–99. doi:10.2307/750228. ISSN 0083-7180. JSTOR 750228. OCLC 888230931. S2CID 192413448.
- Hardy, Sir Thomas Duffus (1846). Modus Tenendi Parliamentum : An Ancient Treatise on the Mode of Holding the Parliament in England. London: George Edward Eyre and William Spottiswoode.
- Maddicott, John Robert Lewendon (2010). The Origins of the English Parliament, 924–1327. Oxford: Oxford University Press. ISBN 9780199585502.
