= William de Botreaux, 3rd Baron Botreaux =

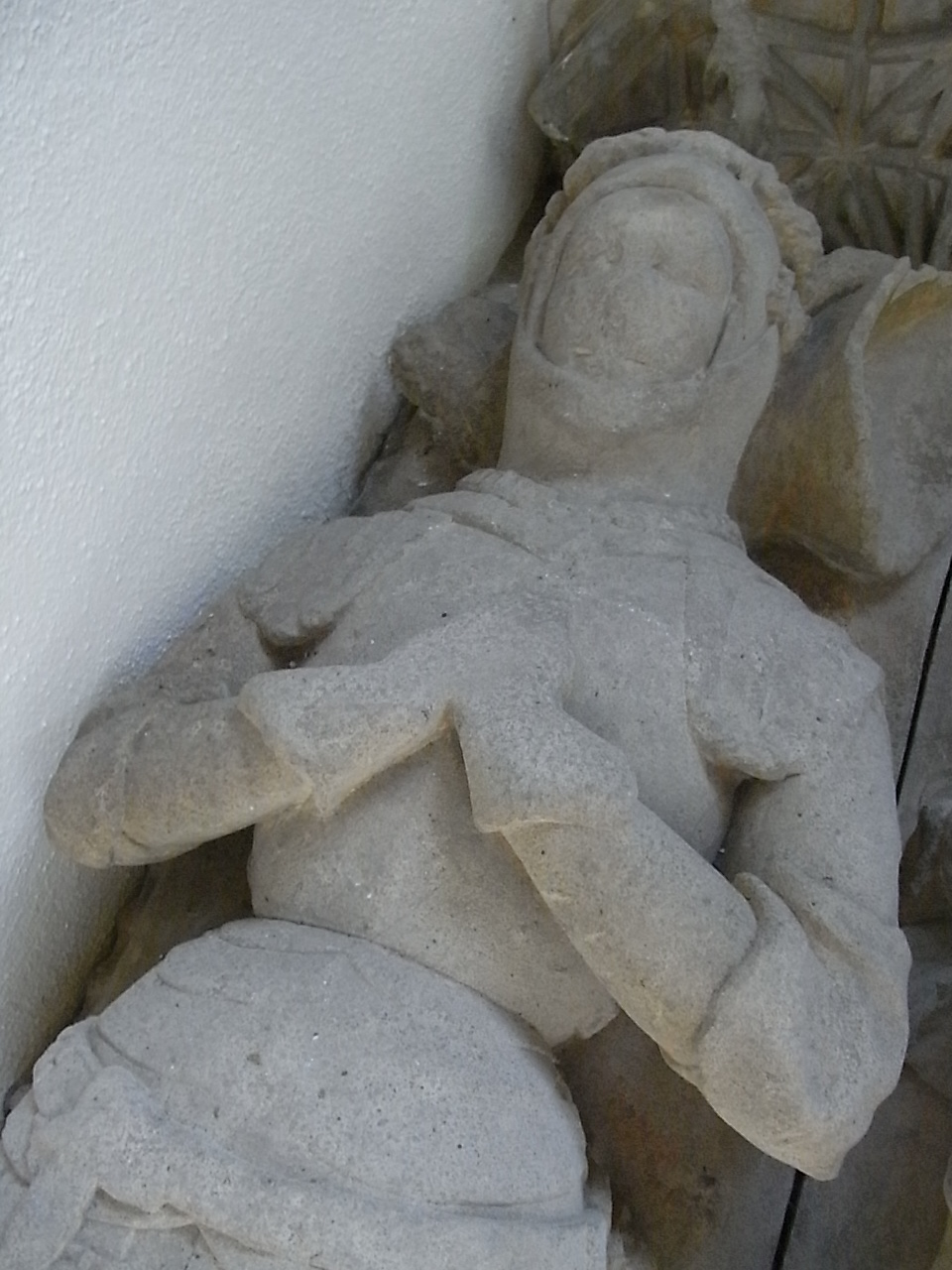
Effigy of William de Botreaux, 3rd Baron Botreaux (d.1462), North Cadbury Church

Drawing (c. 1890) of effigies of William de Botreaux, 3rd Baron Botreaux(d.1462) and his 1st wife Elizabeth Beaumont, North Cadbury Church, Somerset

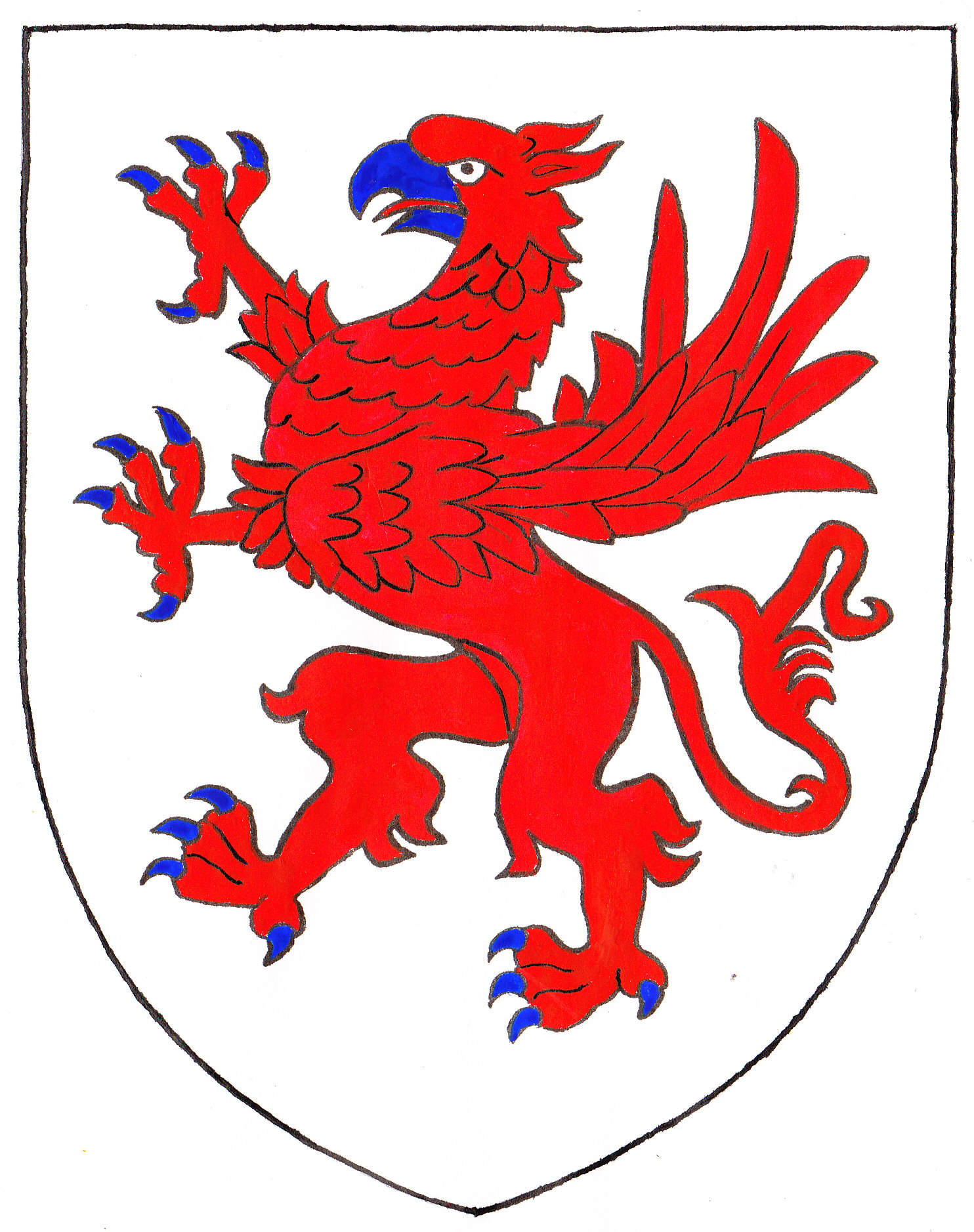
Armorials of Botreaux: Argent, a griffin segreant gules armed azure

William de Botreaux, 3rd Baron Botreaux (1389–1462) was a baron, whose holdings were in Somerset and the south-west of England. He inherited from his father the barony by writ of Botreaux as well as substantial family landholdings which included a moiety of the feudal barony of North Cadbury, Somerset, in the parish church of which capital manor he was buried, as he requested in his will.

== Origins ==
He was born on 20 February 1389 at Walton, Kilmersdon, Somerset, the son of William de Botreaux, 2nd Baron Botreaux (1367–1395) by his wife Elizabeth St Lo, daughter and co-heiress of Sir John St Lo (Latinised to St. Laudo) of Newton St Loe, Wiltshire (now in Somerset), by his second wife Margaret Clyvedon, daughter and heiress of John Clyvedon. Elizabeth was sole heiress of her mother and survived her husband, her death having occurred on 4 September between 1409 and 1458.

== Career ==
He was summoned to parliament on several occasions, the first time being on 1 December 1412, aged 23, and lastly on 23 May 1461, aged 72. As an attendant to King Henry V between 1413 until 1422, he attended Court and served the monarch throughout the Siege of Harfleur and the subsequent Battle of Agincourt in 1415.

After a full and active life of service to the Country, William de Botreaux, 3rd Baron Botreux died on 16 May 1462 probably as a result of injuries sustained at the Second Battle of St. Albans the year before.

== Appointed Forester of Exmoor ==
In 1435 he was appointed by Richard, Duke of York (d.1460), father of the future King Edward IV (1461–1483), as forester of the royal forests of Exmoor and of Neroche, Somerset, as is recorded in the following charter in French surviving in the British Library summarised in Harleian Charter 43 E 47:

Indenture dated 1 January 1435: grant by Richard Duke of York to William de Botreaux, 3rd Baron Botreaux of office of Forester of Exmoor and Neroche. British Library, Harleian Charter 43 E 47

"Indenture made 1st January 13 Henry VI (i.e. 1435) between Richard Duke of York, Earl of March and of Ulster, Lord of Wigmore and of Clare of the one part and William Lord Botreaux ("Sire de Botreaux") of the other; witnessing that the duke has given to Lord Botreaux for life the custody of the forests of Exmoor and Neroche ("Racche"), Somerset, to perform by himself or his sufficient deputies for whom he shall answer. The Lord Botreaux shall take yearly all the revenues, services and other perquisites anciently belonging to the said offices and shall pay yearly to the duke and his heirs at Michaelmas £40 sterling; if the whole or part of that sum be one month in arrear he covenants to pay the duke 100 shillings sterling in addition to the said £40; payment shall be made to the duke's receiver of lands for the county of Somerset or to such other person who may have the duke's sufficient authority. The Lord Botreaux further covenants well and diligently to perform the said offices and in particular to indemnify the duke and his heirs against all demands by the king in respect of destruction or waste due to his default. Sealing clause. 1 Jan 1435. No endorsement. Seal: on a strip cut a third of the way across the document, riband below cut off: round, 1 1/4 inches, pink. Couched shield of arms, a griffin segreant. On a helmet crest, on a cap of maintenance, a griffin. A butress on either side of shield and crest (as supporters) background with sprigs of foliage. Legend: S(IGILLUM) WILLIAM BOTREAUX ("seal of William Botreaux")

The Barons Botreaux held a manor at Molland Bottreaux (sic), on the southern foothills of Exmoor. The forest of Neroche is situated in the Blackdown Hills, Somerset, to which was formerly appended Castle Neroche in the parish of Curland, near Staple Fitzpaine.

== Rebuilds North Cadbury Church ==
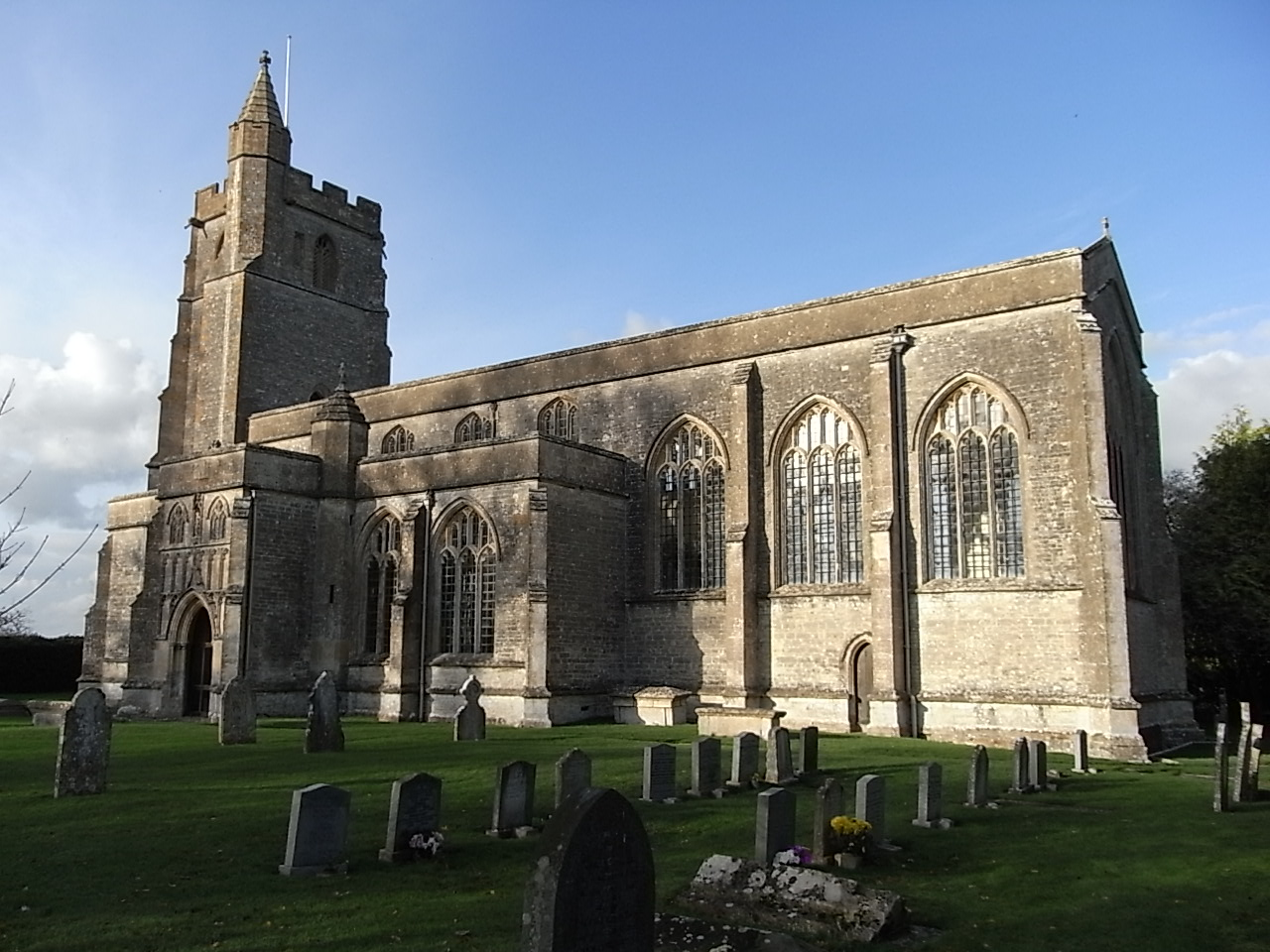
North Cadbury Church, viewed from SE. The nave and chancel were rebuilt in the Perpendicular style by Elizabeth Daubeny, Baroness Botreaux, the earlier tower was retained

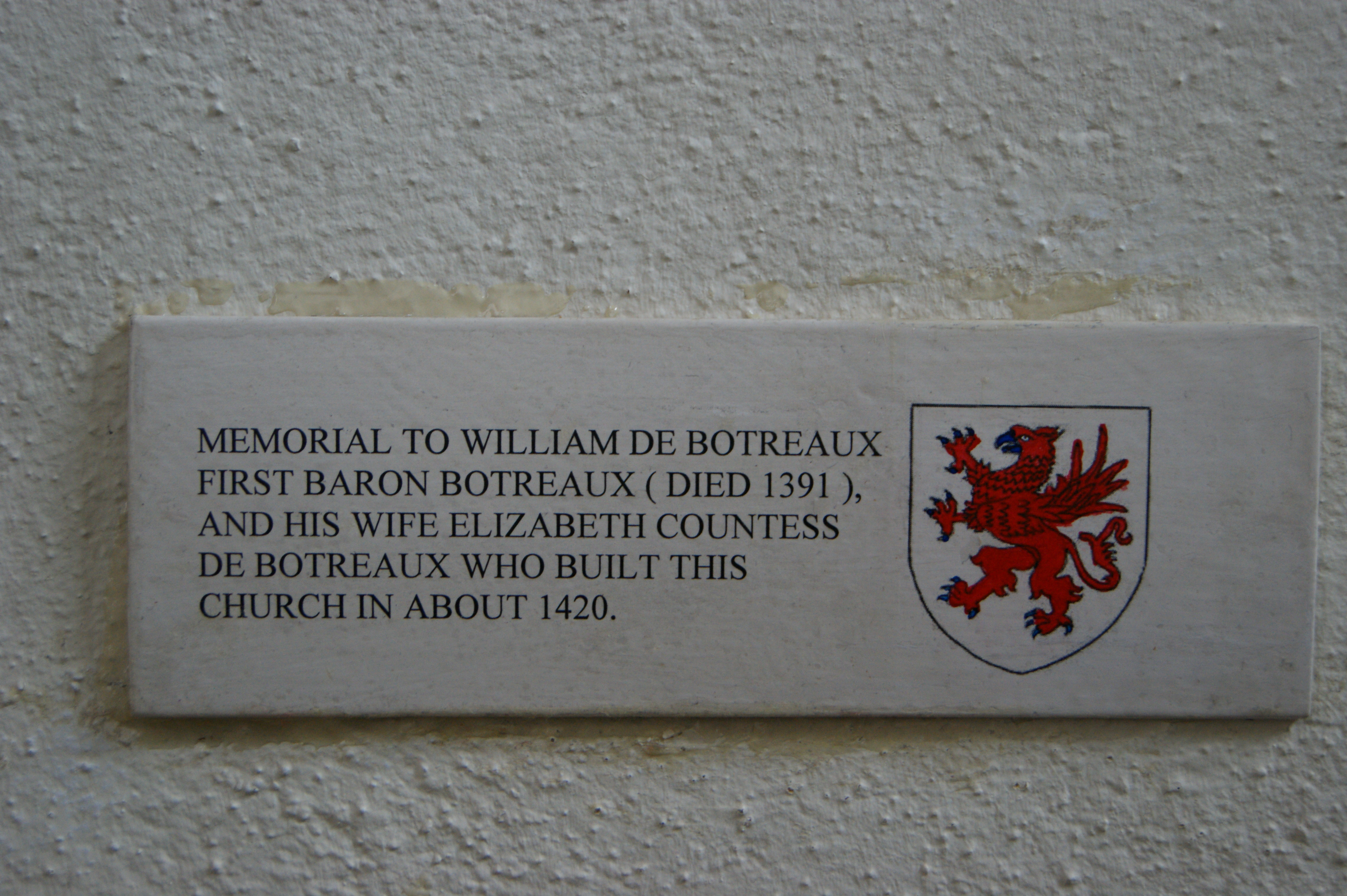
The "memorial to William de Botreaux and his wife Elizabeth" in the church

His grandmother Elizabeth Daubeny (d. 1433), wife of William de Botreaux, 1st Baron Botreaux (d. 1391) wished to found a college of priests in North Cadbury Church, possibly ex voto for the safe return of her grandson from the Agincourt campaign of 1415. Her son, the 2nd baron, had died aged only 27 in 1395, four years after the death of her husband the 1st Baron, thus her grandson was particularly important to her. She was licensed in 1417 to found a college of chaplains in the church. Papal approval was given in 1418 when the church was named St. Michael the Archangel.

In 1423, royal licence was granted for Elizabeth, Lady de Botreaux and "Sir William de Botreaux" (who cannot have been her husband who died in 1391) to convert the parish church of North Cadbury into a college of seven chaplains and four clerks, one of the chaplains being in charge as rector of the college of St. Michael. The chaplains were allowed to acquire property to the value of 100 marks, including the advowson of the church, and land whereon to build a manse.

In 1454, Thomas Beckington (d. 1465), Bishop of Bath & Wells, established an inquiry into the constitution of this collegiate church and admitted a new rector. There is nevertheless still doubt as to whether the college was actually established, yet in 1548, the benefice of North Cadbury was stated as "commonly callyd a college and hathe ben tyme out of mynde". Furthermore one witness said that "yt is written in the churche bookes 'the obitus Willmi. Botrax fundatoris hujus collegii'" ("The obiit of William de Botreaux, founder of this college") The surviving record of her intention states: "to establish therein a perpetual college of seven chaplains, one to preside and to be called the Rector of the College of St Michael the Archangel". She it was, probably with the approval of her grandson, who rebuilt the church in 1423 into the grand and imposing Perpendicular Gothic structure which survives today, in which she was buried. The chancel is unusually tall as it was designed to house stalls for the priests of the college. North Cadbury remained a sole rectory until 1966 when it was held with Compton Pauncefoot, Blackford, Maperton, North Cheriton, and South Cadbury with Sutton Montis. In 1975, the new Camelot parishes benefice was formed comprising North Cadbury, Compton Pauncefoot, Blackford, Maperton, North Cheriton, South Cadbury, and Yarlington.

== Marriage ==
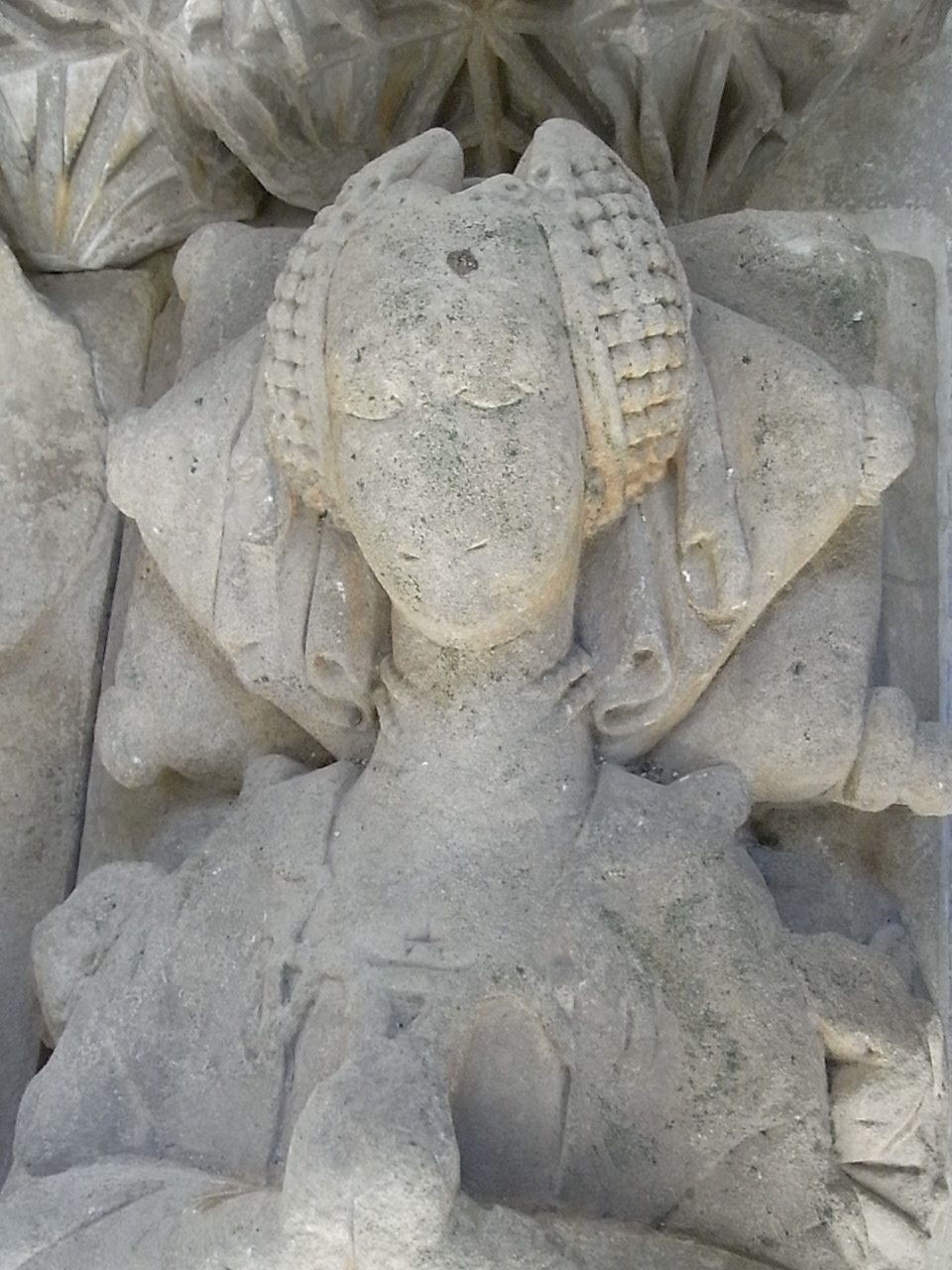
Effigy presumed that of Elizabeth Beaumont, Baroness Botreaux, 1st wife of William de Botreaux, 3rd Baron Botreaux, North Cadbury Church

Arms of Beaumont: Azure semé of fleurs-de-lis, a lion rampant or

He married twice:

- firstly before 1411 to Elizabeth Beaumont, daughter of John Beaumont, 4th Baron Beaumont K.G. (1361–1396) by Katherine Everingham (1367–1428), daughter of Thomas Everingham of Laxton, Nottinghamshire.
- secondly before 1458 to Margaret de Ros (d. 1488), daughter of Thomas de Ros, 8th Baron de Ros (d. 1430) by Eleanor Beauchamp (d. 1467), daughter of Richard de Beauchamp, 13th Earl of Warwick (d. 1439). His second wife survived him and married secondly between May 1462 and 1464 Thomas Burgh, 1st Baron Burgh of Gainsburgh K.G. (d. 1496). She was buried next to her second husband at Gainsborough.

== Progeny ==
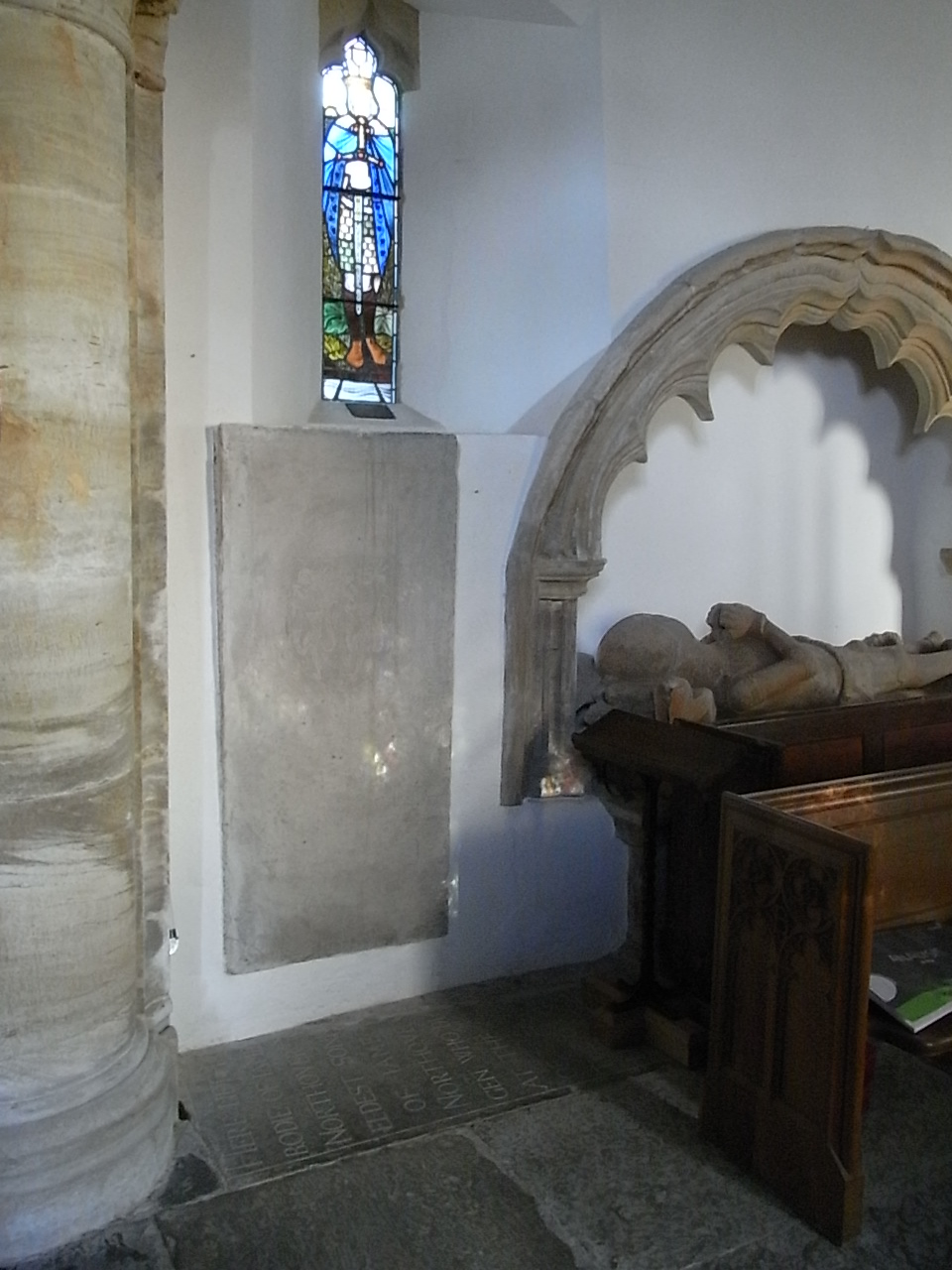
Tombstone of Reginald de Botreaux(d. 1420), Aller Church, Somerset. The recumbent effigy is of Sir John de Clevedon (d. 1372), whose daughter and heiress of Aller was Margaret Clevedon, the maternal grandmother of William de Botreaux, 3rd Baron Botreaux, father of Reginald

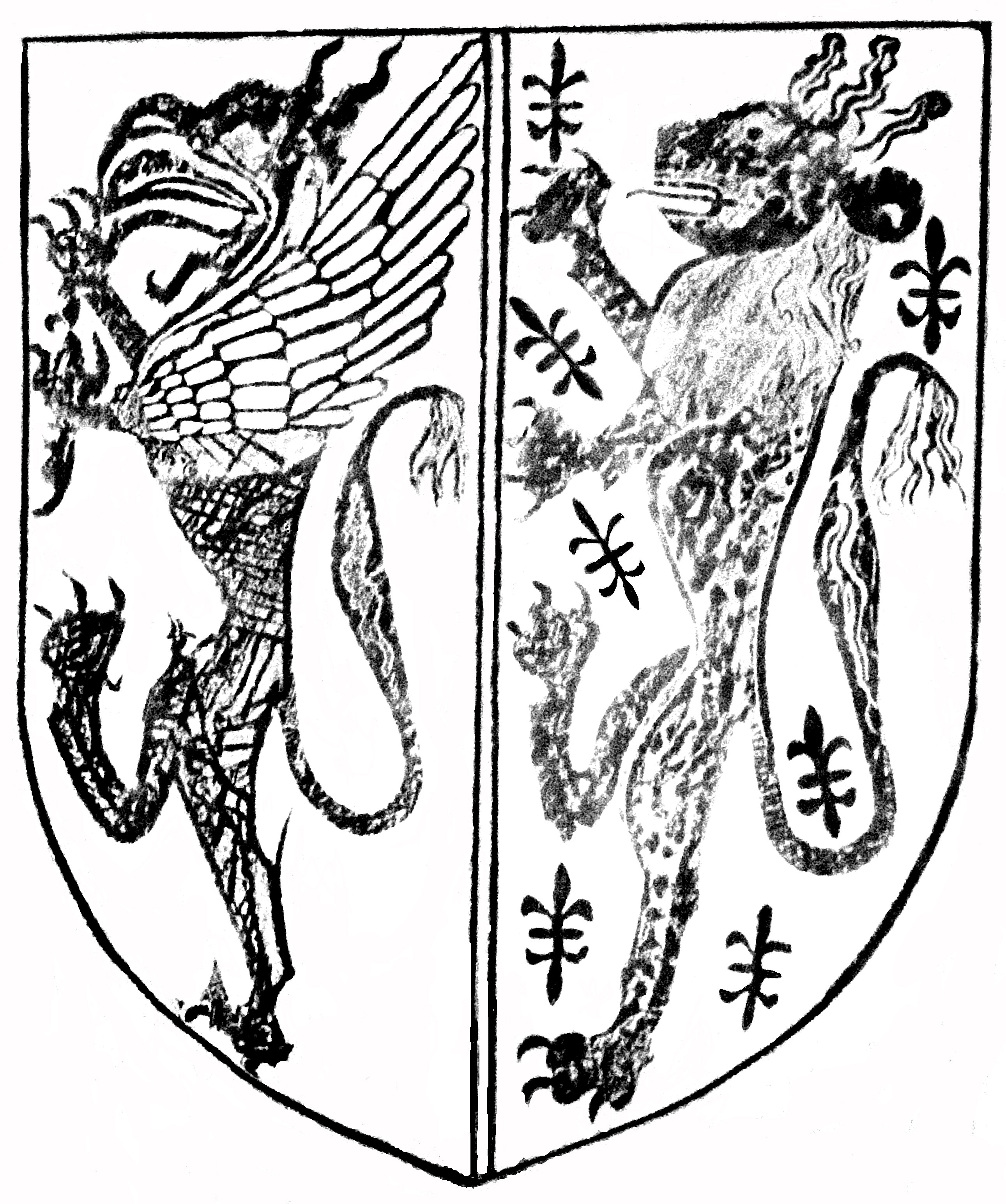
Heraldic escutcheon incised on tombstone of Reginald de Botreaux (d. 1420) in Aller Church, Somerset, showing the impaled arms of his parents: Baron: Argent, a griffin segreant gules armed azure (Botreaux); Femme: Azure seme of fleurs-de-lis a lion rampant or (Beaumont)

By his first wife Elizabeth Beaumont he had the following children:

- William, who died an infant before 1434 and was buried at North Cadbury and after transferred to the Minorite Church at Bridgwater.
- Reginald, died young 1420, the date incised on his tomb stone in Aller Church, Somerset. Aller was one of the family's many manors. The tombstone is now affixed upright to the north wall of the chancel but was formerly set into the floor. It is well preserved for its age and displays within an heraldic escutcheon the griffin rampant of Botreaux impaled with the lion rampant on a field semee-de-lys of Beaumont, the marshalled arms of Reginald's parents. On a ledger line around the border of the slab is inscribed the following text in gothic script:

hic jacet Roginaldus filius William dom de Botreaux qui obiit xxx die julii anno dom mccccxx ("here lies Reginald son of William Lord of Botreaux who died the 30th day of July 1420")

- Anne, married in 1426 Sir John Stafford. She did not survive her father and died without issue.
- Margaret, his sole heiress, suo jure 4th Baroness Botreaux (d. 1478), married Robert Hungerford, 2nd Baron Hungerford (d. 1459). She was buried in Salisbury Cathedral in a now demolished tomb within a chantry chapel she founded there. The tomb and effigy of her husband in Salisbury Cathedral still exists.

== Death ==
He died without surviving male issue on 16 May 1462, according to Cokayne's The Complete Peerage, or was slain at the Second Battle of St Albans in 1461 according to Rogers, 1877, p. 389. He was buried in North Cadbury parish church, in the chantry founded there "by his ancestors" as he had provided for in his will written 38 years before in 1424. He died seized of 50 manors, mostly in the West-country. His Inquest post mortem as a tenant-in-chief of the king dated 1462 refers to him as "William Botreaux, miles", i.e. "knight".

== Tomb at North Cadbury ==
The chest tomb with stone sculpted effigies of the 3rd Baron Botreaux and his 1st wife Elizabeth Beaumont was reported by Rogers (1890) to have been at one time situated in the usual place for a "Founder's Tomb", with the long side against the north side of the chancel wall with the feet end against the eastern wall, but it was subsequently moved to the west end of the church, against the south wall of the tower, where it remains today. Rogers suggests it may originally have stood in the vicinity of the Botreaux chantry, in a side aisle, possibly where the organ is now situated, at the eastern end of the north aisle, a place of honour often used for founder's chapels. The attribution of the effigies to the 3rd baron and his 1st wife is not certain as no inscription remains. However the style of the plate armour and the lady's head-dress suggest a mid-15th-century date and the crest on the helm on which the knight rests his head is certainly that of Botreaux seen on the seal of the 1435 Exmoor charter, and shows an animal's body akin to a deer standing on a cap of maintenance with the front part of the animal in the form of a griffin, with the features of the face now lost, but with parts of the wings visible. He wears full plate armour and the SS livery collar around his neck and a pointed helmet with a wreath or orle around it. The features of the face are very worn away. His feet rest on a lion. The effigy of his wife, presumed to be Elizabeth Beaumont wears a horned (or mitred) head-dress adorned with pearls, with necklace and cross, long gown with mantle over, fastened with cord and tassels. Her head lies on a double cushion, the uppermost of a lozenge shape. Only the hands and feet of supporting angels remain attached to her shoulders. At her feet are two dogs, addorsed, one with bells. The chest tomb shows on the long side (facing north) panels of angels holding escutcheons, the former heraldic painting on which is now totally effaced. At the east end (the feet end) is a group of the Virgin Mary holding the infant Christ, with a knight kneeling in prayer towards her at her right-hand, and a lady (with horned head-dress) similarly kneeling at her left. The two kneeling figures represent the baron and his wife. The figures occupy 3 individual panels under gothic cusps. The text formerly painted on sculpted stone speech-scrolls attached to the kneeling figures is now totally effaced but would have been prayers to the Virgin Mary. On the west end of the chest tomb are painted three escutcheons on which painted quartered armorials are still visible albeit much worn away, but these may be later restorations. Certainly rampant griffins are visible, but not in the 1st and 4th quarters as might be expected for the arms of the husband, but in the 2nd and 3rd quarters. The arms shown in the 1st & 4th quarters appear to show 3 leaves with stalks and 3 escallops. There is a canopy above the heads of the effigies. Rogers (1890) reports that the appointments of the knight's armour were gilded and that the gown of the lady was red, the bodice blue and the mantle black. All such colouring has now disappeared.

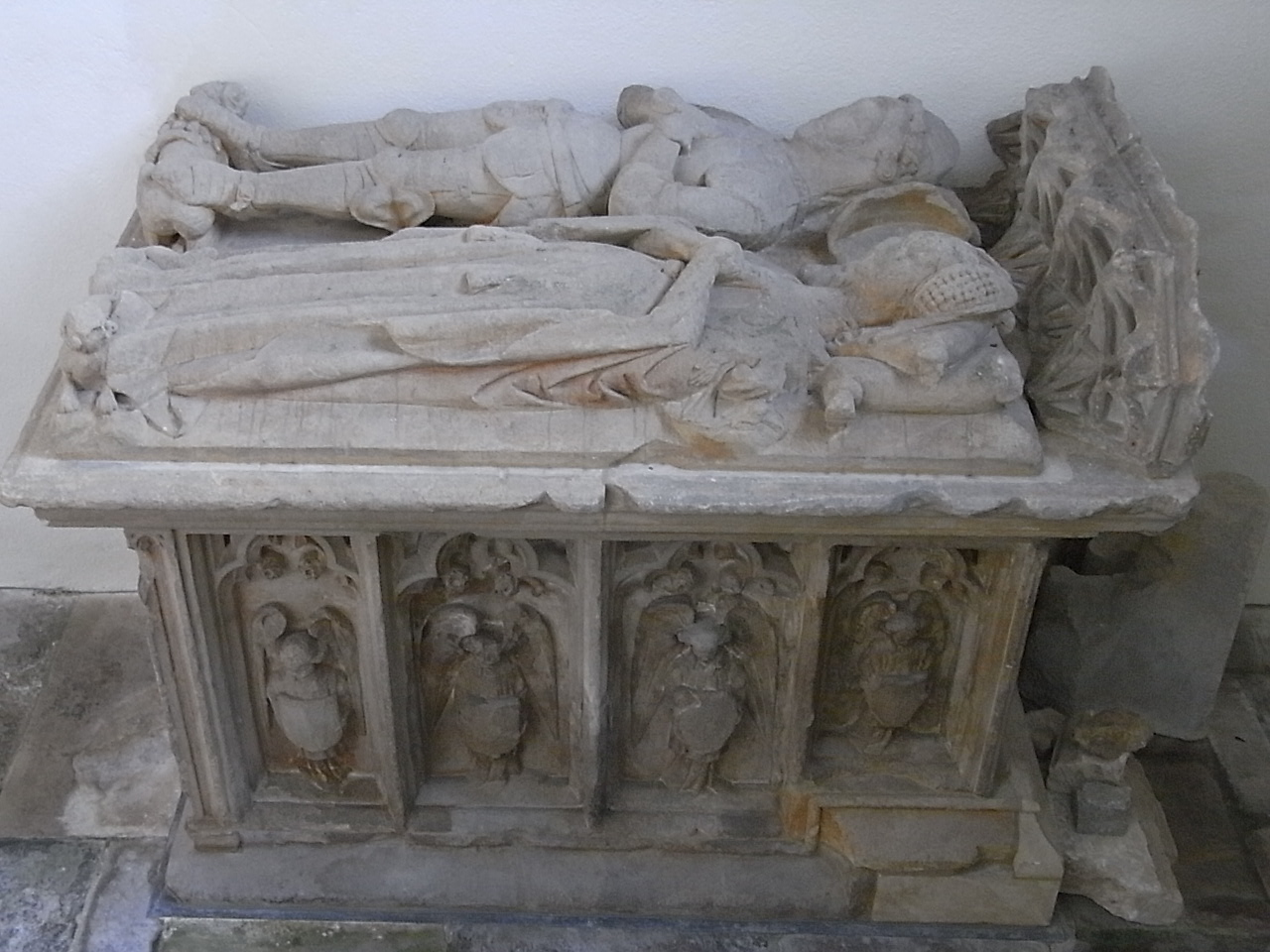
North side of chest tomb

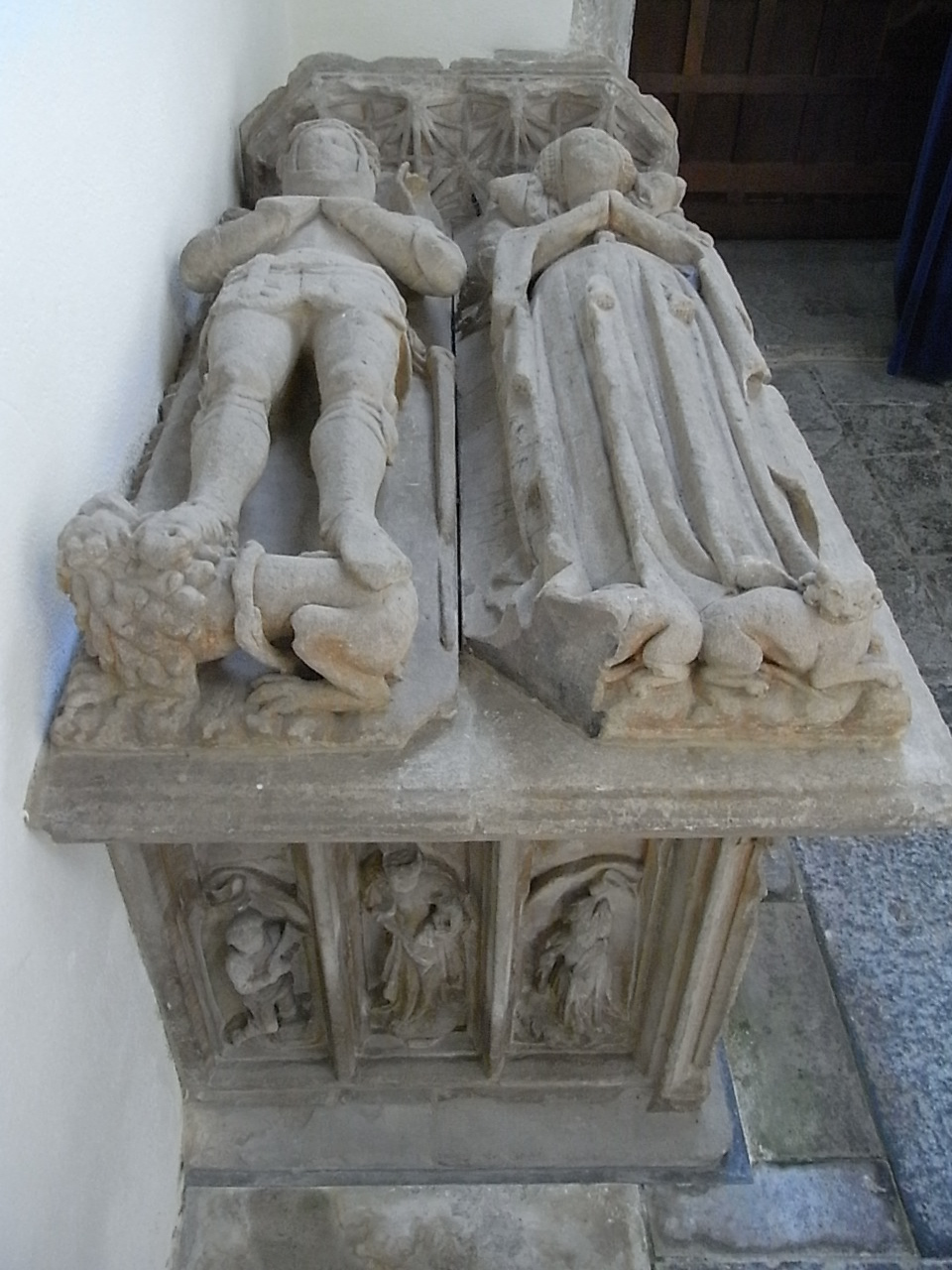
Eastern end of chest tomb

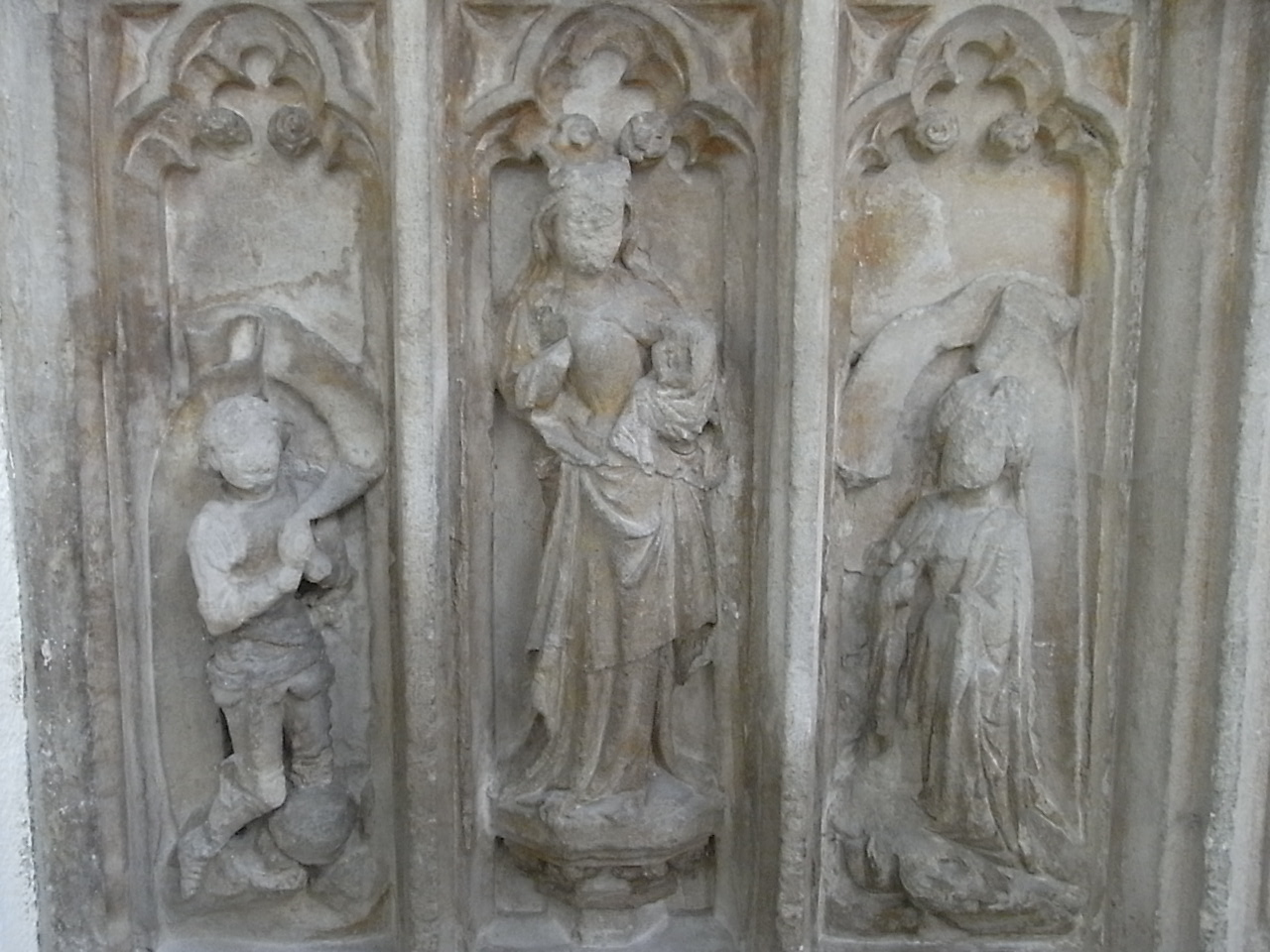
Eastern end panel of chest tomb

== Sources ==
- G.E.Cokayne, The Complete Peerage, new edition, vol. 2, pp. 241–242
- Rogers, W. H. Hamilton, The Antient Sepulchral Effigies and Monumental and Memorial Sculpture of Devon, Exeter, 1877, p. 388-9
- Rogers, W. H. Hamilton, The Strife of the Roses and Days of the Tudors in the West, Exeter, 1890, pp. 147–8
- Victoria County History, Religious History, North Cadbury

Peerage of England
Preceded by William de Botreaux	Baron Botreaux; 1395–1462	Succeeded by Margaret de Botreaux
