= Christopher Preston, 2nd Baron Gormanston =

Christopher Preston, 2nd Baron Gormanston (c. 1354 – 1422) was an Anglo-Irish peer and statesman. He was accused of treason and imprisoned in 1418–19, but was soon released and restored to royal favour.

== Early career ==
He was the son of Robert Preston, 1st Baron Gormanston and his first wife Margaret de Bermingham, daughter and heiress of Walter de Bermingham, feudal baron of Kells-in-Ossory. He was born between 1354 and 1360.

He was knighted in 1397 and took his seat in the Irish House of Lords; although the Crown also recognised Baron Gormanston as a hereditary peerage, Christopher sat in the Lords as Baron Kells, in right of his mother.

== Charge of treason ==
His career appears to have been uneventful until 1418, when he clashed with John Talbot, 1st Earl of Shrewsbury, the Lord Lieutenant of Ireland. Talbot accused Gormanston, Gerald FitzGerald, 5th Earl of Kildare and the Prior of the Order of Hospitallers at Kilmainham, Thomas Le Boteller, of a treasonable conspiracy. The prior, who was a professional soldier, removed himself from the conflict by going to fight at the Siege of Rouen, and died there two years later; but Kildare and Gormanston were imprisoned and subject to forfeiture of their lands. They were accused of dissolving Parliament without the Lord Lieutenant's consent, holding a purported Parliament without Royal authority, uttering threats against the Lord Lieutenant and Privy Council, and plotting to kill the Lord Lieutenant.

As regards the truth or falsehood of the more serious charges, Gormanston had undoubtedly acted in a high-handed manner by trying to dissolve Parliament, but Otway-Ruthven considers it unlikely that he was guilty of anything more than hostility to Talbot. This enmity may have been the first sign of the 30-year feud, which came to completely dominate Irish public life, between Talbot and his allies on the one hand, and James Butler, 4th Earl of Ormonde, who was the Prior's half-brother and Kildare's future son-in-law, on the other.

The evidence of treason against Gormanston consisted mainly of his possession of the King's Coronation Oath, and also of a controversial 14th-century treatise, the Modus Tenendi Parliamentum, which had apparently belonged to his father. Although the treatise stresses the importance of Parliament's role in Government and (on an extreme view) could be taken as justifying the deposition of the King, Lord Gormanston's possession of it may simply indicate that he was interested in political reform. He explained that he thought the treatise, which he had found in his father's collection of manuscripts, was worth preserving.

He was quickly cleared of the charges of treason, released and restored to his estates. In 1421 he was sent with a message from Parliament to King Henry V. He died the following year.

== Family ==
He married Elizabeth de Londres, daughter and co-heiress of William de Londres, feudal baron of Naas. She was still alive in 1400. His son Christopher succeeded as Baron of Gormanston, Kells and Naas. He also had at least one daughter, Elizabeth, who married Thomas Fleming, 2nd Baron Slane and had issue.

Peerage of Ireland
Preceded by Robert Preston	Baron Gormanston; 1396–1422	Succeeded by Christopher Preston
