= William de Botreaux, 1st Baron Botreaux =

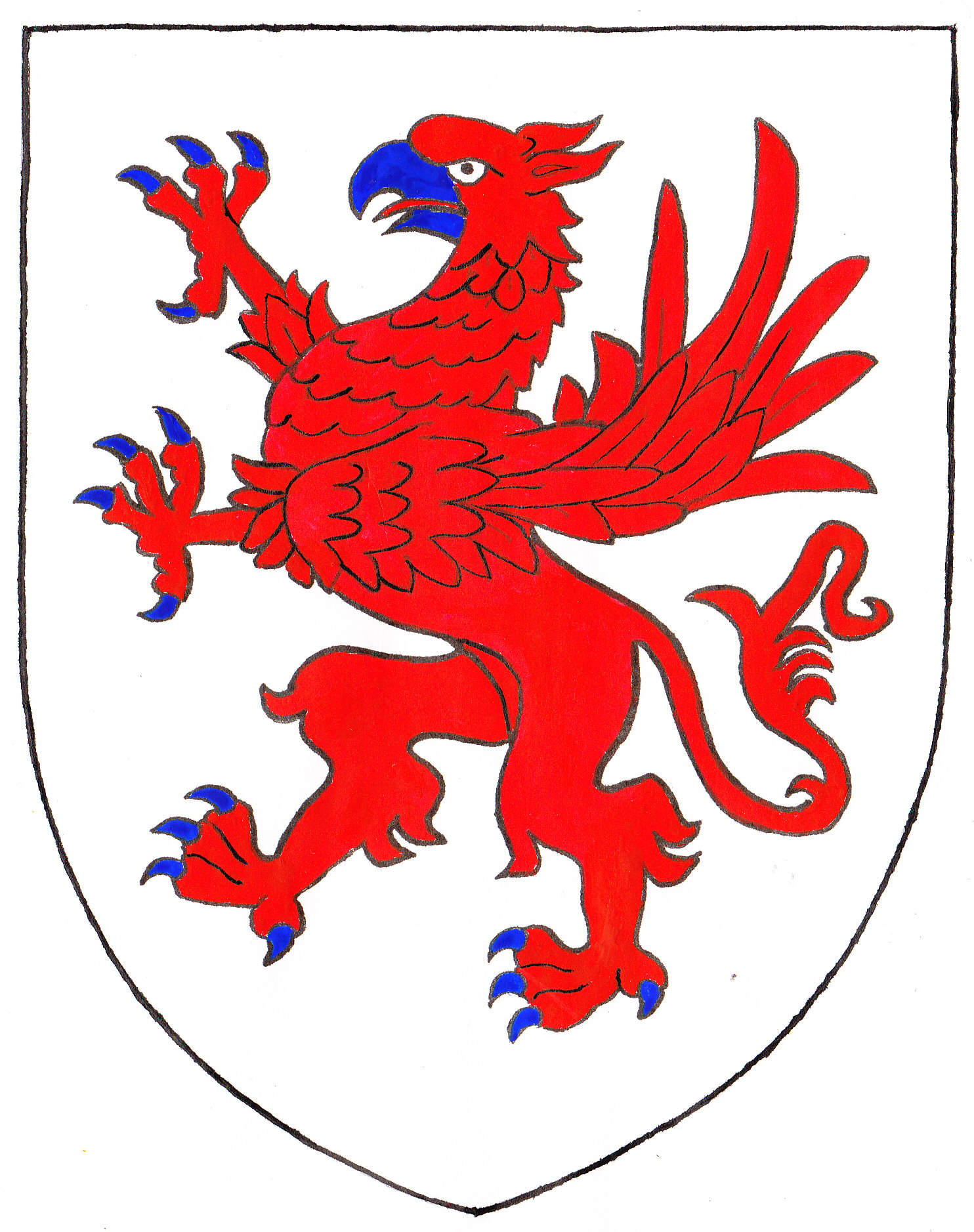
Arms of Botreaux: Argent, a griffin segreant gules armed azure

William de Botreaux (1337–1391) was a prominent English baron during the reigns of King Edward III (1327–1377) and King Richard II (1377–1399).

== Origins ==
He was the son and heir of William de Botreaux (d. 22 July 1349) of Forrabury, Cornwall, Sheriff of Cornwall, by Isabel de Moels, younger daughter and co-heiress (with her sister Muriel, the wife of Thomas Courtenay (d. 1363) 5th son of Hugh de Courtenay, 1st Earl of Devon) of John de Moels, 4th Baron Moels(d.1337), of East Berkhampstead, Hertfordshire and feudal baron of a moiety of North Cadbury, Somerset, by his wife Joan Lovel, daughter of Richard Lovel of Castle Cary, Somerset. The family is believed to have come from Les Bottereaux, in Upper Normandy near Evreux, France. His father William (d. 1349) was the son of Reynold (d. 1346), son of William (d. c. 1342), son of William (d. 1302), son of Reynold (d. 1273).

== Career ==
He was born on 1 September 1337 at Botelet near Herodsfoot, three miles northeast of Lanreath, Cornwall. Botelet is 20 miles south of the family's ancient seat of Boscastle on the north Cornish coast. He received livery of his lands on 27 September 1359. In 1359, he took part in the expedition to Saxony and in 1380, he was in the expedition to support Portugal against Spain.

== Created baron by writ ==
During the reign of King Edward III he was first summoned to parliament by writ addressed to Willelmo de Botreaux on 24 February 1367/8. He thus became the 1st Baron Botreaux. He was likewise summoned on several further occasions the last of which was 12 September 1390.

== Marriage ==
In February 1369/70 he married Elizabeth Daubeny (d. 29/5/1433), daughter of Ralph Daubeny, 2nd Baron Daubeny (1305–c. 1342) by Katherine Thweng, sister and co-heiress of Thomas Thweng, 4th Baron Thweng.

== Progeny ==
He left the following progeny by Elizabeth Daubeny:

- William de Botreaux, 2nd Baron Botreaux (1367–1395)
- John de Botreaux (3rd son), lived at Molland-Bottreaux, Devon.

== Death ==
He died on 10 August 1391. Before 1421 his widow Elizabeth became a nun at Tarrant Abbey, Dorset.

== Sources ==
- G. E. Cokayne Complete Peerage; vol 2, pp. 241–242

Peerage of England
New creation	Baron Botreaux; 1367–1391	Succeeded by William de Botreaux
