= Baron Mauley =

English noble title

Coat of arms of Baron Mauley, Lord of Mulgrave, Or, a bend Sable.

Baron Mauley was a title of nobility in the peerage of England, named after the medieval Mauley family of barons in Yorkshire, who had their seat at Mulgrave Castle. The family had been established in England by Peter de Maulay (one of King John's "evil counsellors") in the 13th century. It was his grandson, Peter Mauley III, who was created "Baron Mauley" on 24 June 1295 by a writ of summons to parliament. The barony fell into abeyance in 1415.

In the 19th century, a new title, Baron "de Mauley", was created for a descendant of one of the co-heirs of the Mauley barony.

== Barons Mauley (1295) ==
- Peter de Mauley, 1st Baron Mauley (1249–1308)
- Peter de Mauley, 2nd Baron Mauley (1281–1336?), son of preceding
- Peter de Mauley, 3rd Baron Mauley (c. 1300–1355), son of preceding
- Peter de Mauley, 4th Baron Mauley (c. 1331–1383), son of preceding
- Peter de Mauley, 5th Baron Mauley (c. 1378–1415), grandson of preceding

The fifth baron's nephew, Ralph Bigod (1410–1461), who inherited Mulgrave castle, was sometimes styled "Lord Mauley". He was slain at the Battle of Towton, 1461.
