= Thomas Fauconberg, 5th Baron Fauconberg =

Thomas Fauconberg
- Born: July 20, 1345; Skelton, Yorkshire, England
- Died: 9 September 1407 (aged 62); Newcastle upon Tyne, Northumberland, England
- Occupations: Peer, Military Leader
- Known for: Participation in the Hundred Years' War, Imprisonment for Treason, Mental Health Issues
- Title: Baron Fauconberg
- Predecessor: Walter de Fauconberg, 4th Baron Fauconberg
- Successor: Title became abeyant upon his death
- Spouse: Constance de Felton (m. 17 November 1366; d. 1402)
- Children: John Fauconberg (d. 1405), Joan Fauconberg (m. William Neville, 1st Earl of Kent)

Thomas Fauconberg, 5th Baron Fauconberg (20 July 1345 – 9 September 1407) was an English peer.

Fauconberg was the eldest son of Walter Fauconberg, 4th Baron Fauconberg, and his wife, Maud. Circa 1376, Thomas joined the French in the Hundred Years' War and was imprisoned in Gloucester Castle, for treason, from 1378 to 1391. After being released, he was allegedly considered intellectually disabled, despite being appointed to "keep the seas" (with the 4th Baron Clinton and Sir Richard Waldegrave) in 1402. He was later considered sane when examined by King Henry IV and his Council in c. 1406.

On 17 November 1366, Lord Fauconberg had married Constance de Felton (died 1402) and they had one son, John, (died 1405). After his first wife died, he was married to Joan Brounflete (died 1409) and they had one daughter, Joan (1406–1490) who later married William Neville, Earl of Kent.

In 1405, Fauconberg's son had been executed for his part in the conspiracy against Henry IV and so on Fauconberg's own death in 1407, his title became abeyant. It was later called out abeyance for the Earl of Kent in right of his wife.

== Sources ==
- Burke's Peerage & Gentry, 107th edition

Peerage of England
Preceded by Walter Fauconberg	Baron Fauconberg; 1362–1407	Succeeded by Abeyant; Joan Fauconberg
