= Ralph de Cromwell, 1st Baron Cromwell =

Ralph de Cromwell, 1st Baron Cromwell 2nd creation (died 27 August 1398), Tattershall in Lincolnshire, was an English peer. He was summoned to the House of Lords as Lord Cromwell in 1375.

Cromwell died in August 1398, and was succeeded in the barony by his son, Ralph. His grandson, Ralph, 3rd Baron Cromwell, served as Lord Privy Councillor, Treasurer of England and Chamberlain of the Household during the reign of Henry VI. He and Thomas Cromwell share descent from Baron John de Cromwell the first Baron Cromwell.

== Family ==
Ralph married Maud (b.1337), daughter of John Bernack and Joan (d.1361), daughter of John Marmion, 4th Baron Marmion of Winteringham and had the following issue:-

- Ralph Cromwell. Son and heir.
- Amice de Cromwell
- Maud de Cromwell
- Elizabeth de Cromwell

== Bibliography ==
- Farnham, George F. (1919). Leicestershire Manors: The Manors of Allexton, Appleby and Ashby Folville (PDF). Leicester: Leicestershire Archaeological and Historical Society.
- Kidd, Charles, Williamson, David (editors). Debrett's Peerage and Baronetage (1990 edition). New York: St Martin's Press, 1990.
- Calendar of Inquisitions Post Mortem. Vol. XI. London: HMSO. 1935.
- Leigh Rayment's Peerage Pages

Peerage of England
| Preceded by New Creation | Baron Cromwell; 1375–1398 | Succeeded by Ralph de Cromwell |
