= Jane Boleyn, Viscountess Rochford =

English noblewoman (c. 1505–1542)

Jane Boleyn
- Viscountess Rochford
- Born: Jane Parker c. 1505; Norfolk, England
- Died: 13 February 1542 (aged 36–37); Tower of London, England
- Buried: Chapel Royal of St. Peter ad Vincula, Tower of London; 51.508611°N 0.076944°W
- Noble family: Parker; Boleyn (by marriage)
- Spouse: George Boleyn, Viscount Rochford (m. 1524; died 1536)
- Father: Henry Parker, 10th Baron Morley
- Mother: Alice St John

Jane Boleyn, Viscountess Rochford (née Parker; c. 1505 – 13 February 1542) was an English noblewoman. Her husband, George Boleyn, Viscount Rochford, was the brother of Anne Boleyn, the second wife of King Henry VIII, and a cousin to King Henry VIII's fifth wife Catherine Howard, making Jane a cousin-in-law. Jane had been a member of the household of Henry's first wife, Catherine of Aragon. It is possible that she played a role in the verdicts against, and subsequent executions of, her husband and Anne Boleyn. She was later a lady-in-waiting to Henry's third and fourth wives, and then to his fifth wife, Catherine Howard, with whom she was executed.

== Early life ==
Born Jane Parker, she was the daughter of Henry Parker, 10th Baron Morley, and Alice St. John, great-granddaughter of Margaret Beauchamp of Bletso. Through Margaret, Jane was a distant relation of King Henry VIII – specifically his half-second-cousin – and this, in turn, made her a second cousin once removed of all of the King's children, including her niece-by-marriage, Elizabeth I. She was born in Norfolk around the year 1505; her family were wealthy, well-connected, politically active and respected members of the English nobility. Her father was an intellectual, with a great interest in culture and education. She was sent to the royal court in her early teens, certainly before her fifteenth birthday, where she joined the household of King Henry VIII's first wife, Katherine of Aragon. She is recorded as having accompanied the royal party on the state visit to France in 1520, "The Field of the Cloth of Gold".

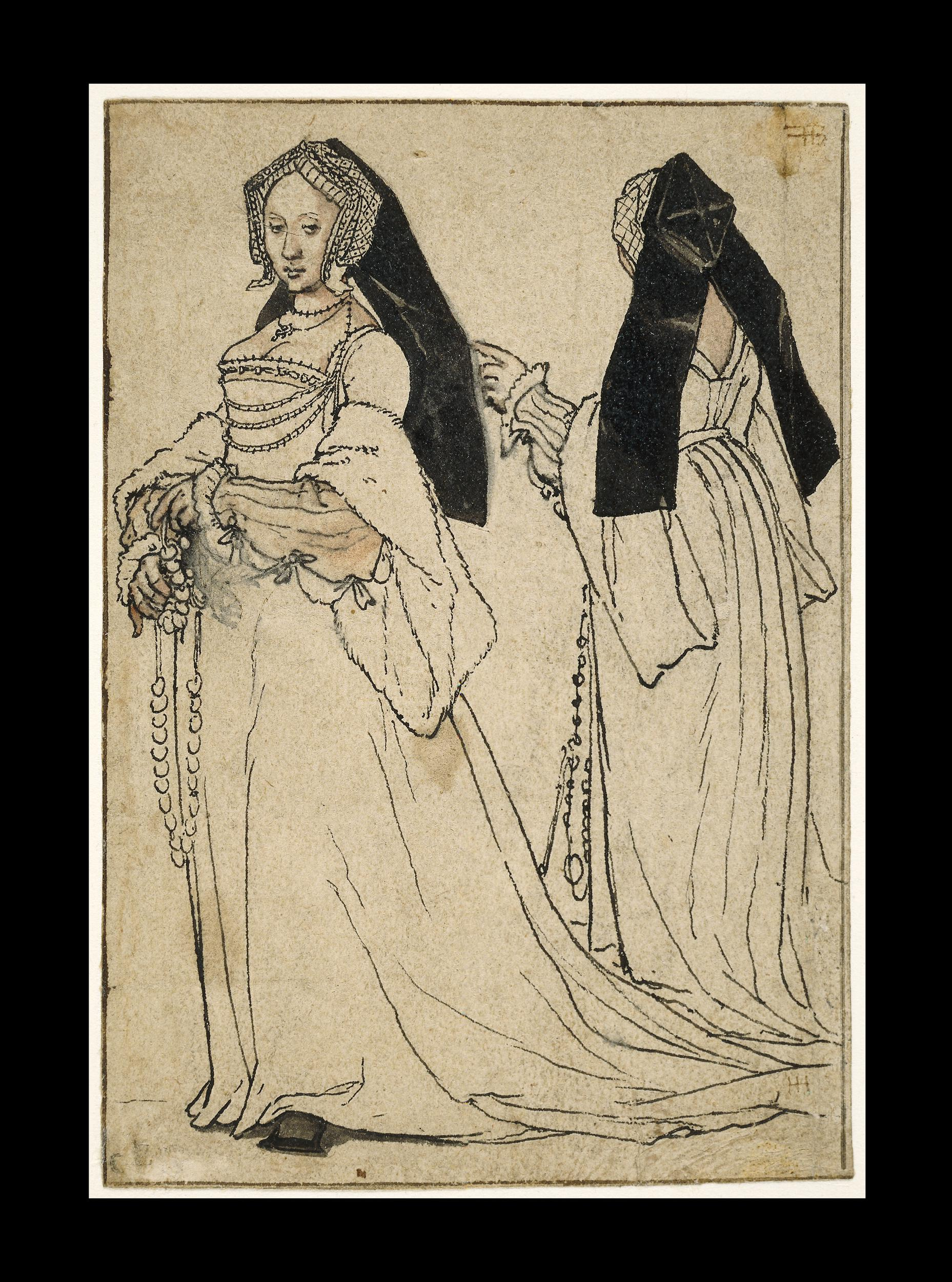
Unknown woman in Tudor dress

Although it has long been supposed that nothing is recorded of Jane's appearance (and there is no surviving portrait that can be identified as her), her biographer Julia Fox, in Jane Boleyn: The Infamous Lady Rochford, suggests that there is a very remote chance that a Holbein painting represents a likeness of Jane. Meanwhile, she considers "the best impression we can have of Jane Rochford is Holbein’s drawings of an unknown woman in Tudor dress" (pp. 317–319). She was probably considered attractive, given that she was chosen to appear as one of the lead actresses/dancers in the prestigious Château Vert masquerade at Court in 1522. The seven performers were selected from the ladies of court in large part for their attractiveness, including the King's sister Mary Tudor, Dowager Queen of France. Two of the other performers included Jane's future sisters-in-law, Anne and Mary Boleyn.

== Marriage ==
Lady Rochford's signature

In late 1524 or early 1525, she was married to George Boleyn (later Viscount Rochford), brother of Anne Boleyn, who later became the second queen of Henry VIII. At this stage, however, Anne was not completely attached to the King, although she was already one of the leaders of fashionable society.

As a wedding present, King Henry gave Jane and George Grimston Manor in Norfolk. Since she gained the courtesy title of Viscountess Rochford in 1529 when her husband was made a viscount, she was usually known at court (and by subsequent historians) as "Lady Rochford". As the Boleyn family's wealth and influence increased, the couple were given the Palace of Beaulieu in Essex as their chief residence, which George and Jane decorated with a lavish chapel, a tennis court, a bathroom with hot-and-cold running water, imported carpets, mahogany furniture and their own large collection of silverware. Their marital bed was draped in cloth of gold with a white satin canopy, linen quilts and a yellow counterpane. Beaulieu had initially belonged to the Boleyns as one of their country retreats before they sold it to the King, who spent over £17,000 lavishly refurbishing and expanding it. In the early 1530s, it became the main residence of his eldest daughter, Mary, but when she was banished to Hatfield House, Viscount Rochford was given the house to live in, although the deeds were never formally signed over.

Traditionally, George and Jane's marriage has been portrayed as an unhappy one. One modern historian has suggested that George was homosexual. Julia Fox, Jane's most recent biographer, disagrees with both arguments, concluding that the exact nature of the marriage is unclear but suggesting that it was by no means unhappy.

The exact nature of her relationship with her royal sister-in-law Anne is not clear either, and there is no evidence as to what she thought of her other sister-in-law, Mary Boleyn, who had been at court with Jane since they were both teenagers. It has been historically assumed that Jane was not overly fond of Anne, allegedly because of Jane's jealousy of her.

=== Role in husband's execution ===
After 11 years of marriage, George Boleyn was arrested in May 1536 and imprisoned in the Tower of London, accused of having had sexual intercourse with his sister Queen Anne. Elizabeth Somerset, Countess of Worcester, is said by contemporaries to have provided the evidence against the Queen and her brother. There was no truth in these rumours, according to the vast majority of contemporary witnesses, but they provided the legal pretext that the Boleyns' enemies needed to bring about the execution of Lord Rochford. Jane was mentioned only once during the trials, when George Boleyn was asked if the Queen had relayed information about Henry's sexual troubles to her.

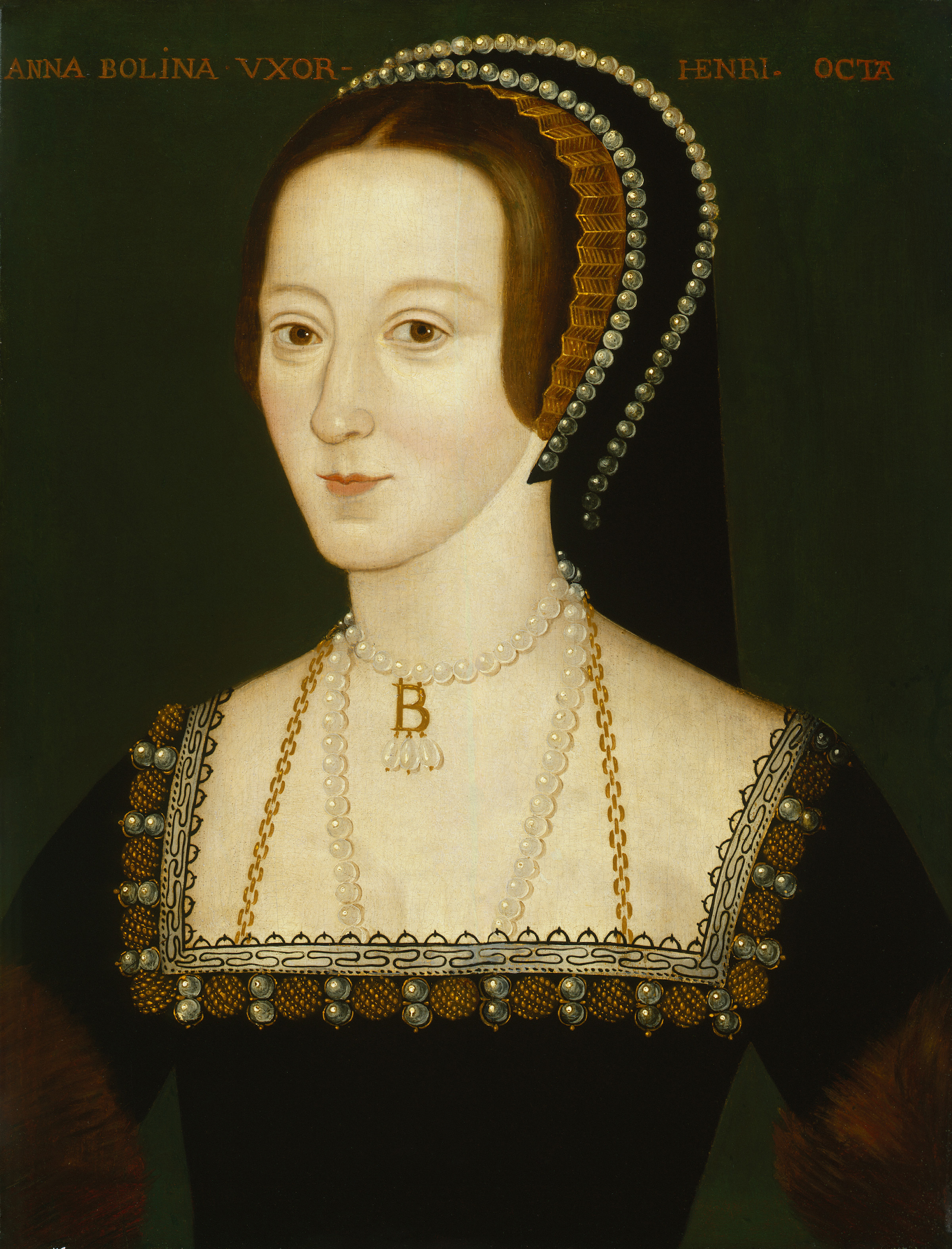
Anne Boleyn, Jane Boleyn's sister-in-law and queen of England, Henry VIII's second wife

The first mention of any tensions between Jane and her husband came long after their deaths, when George Wyatt called her "wicked wife, accuser of her own husband, even to the seeking of his own blood," in his biography of Queen Anne, but this view would have been informed by the later Catherine Howard episode, when both she and the Queen were executed for treason, and Wyatt's own attempts to exonerate the late Queen Anne. Subsequent generations of historians also believed that Jane's testimony against her husband and sister-in-law in 1536 was motivated by spite rather than any actual belief in their guilt, hence her generally unfavourable historical reputation. A century later, an historian asserted that Jane had testified against them because of her "inveterate hatred" of Queen Anne, which sprang from envy of Anne's superior social skills and George's preference for his sister's company to that of his wife. This assertion is not consistent with the records of the period; not only is there no mention of any serious rift between the couple (and the few mentions of their marriage imply at least a tolerable relationship), but by the time of the death of Jane Seymour, Jane Rochford had already rebuilt her reputation at court and been one of the Queen's chief mourners. Georgian and Victorian histories pointed to Jane's execution in 1542 to suggest that moral justice had triumphed because "the infamous Lady Rochford ... justly deserved her fate for the concern which she had in bringing Anne Boleyn, as well as her own husband, to the block". This view of Jane as accuser, despite lacking historical proof, gained traction after her death, and was popularised by subsequent historians.

This negative view of Jane was rejected by her biographer, Julia Fox, who believes that Jane actually enjoyed a warm and supportive relationship with Queen Anne and that terror of the palace coup against the Boleyns in 1536 provoked Jane's testimony, which in any case was twisted by the family's enemies. In her 2007 book, Fox writes:

Jane Rochford found herself dragged into a maelstrom of intrigue, innuendo and speculation. For when the King's chief minister Cromwell sent for Jane, he already had much of what he needed, not only to bring down Anne and her circle, but to make possible the King's marriage to Jane Seymour ... Faced with such relentless, incessant questions, which she had no choice but to answer, Jane would have searched her memory for every tiny incident that occurred to her ... Jane had not been quick to tell tales, but she had buckled under the pressure of relentless questioning ... And it was her weakness under interrogation that gave her future detractors – happy to find a scapegoat to exonerate the King from the heinous charge of callously killing his innocent wife – the ammunition to maintain that it was her evidence that had fooled Henry and destroyed Anne and George ...

== Widowhood ==
George Boleyn was beheaded on Tower Hill on 17 May 1536. His final speech was chiefly concerned with promoting his new-found Protestant faith. Four other men were executed alongside him, also accused of having been Anne's lovers. Only one, Mark Smeaton, a musician, had confessed, and it was reported that he had been tortured into doing so. Members of the aristocracy and gentry could not legally be tortured. Anne was executed two days later, beheaded by a French swordsman, on Tower Green. Anne's poise and courage at the scaffold were much commented upon, and public opinion in the weeks and months after often "made of Anne a persecuted heroine, bright with promise and goodness as a young woman, beautiful and elegant." It is not known whether Jane witnessed the execution of either her husband or her sister-in-law, but the posthumous sympathy Anne aroused in many meant that many of those linked to her fall were cast in the roles of villains. According to Julia Fox, this explains how Jane's actions were construed as being those of a cruel and jealous intriguer.

The immediate aftermath of the fall of the Boleyns was hard for her, both socially and financially. The lands which the Boleyns had built up during Anne Boleyn's reign and over the previous four generations, including the titles Earl of Wiltshire and Earl of Ormond, were to pass through the male line only, and thus were lost to the family with George's death. Jane continued to use the courtesy title of Viscountess Rochford but without a son she could not benefit from what remained of the Boleyn family fortune. (Modern rumours that George Boleyn, Dean of Lichfield, a colourful character, was the child of Jane and George are now thought to be false.)

=== Later political intrigues ===
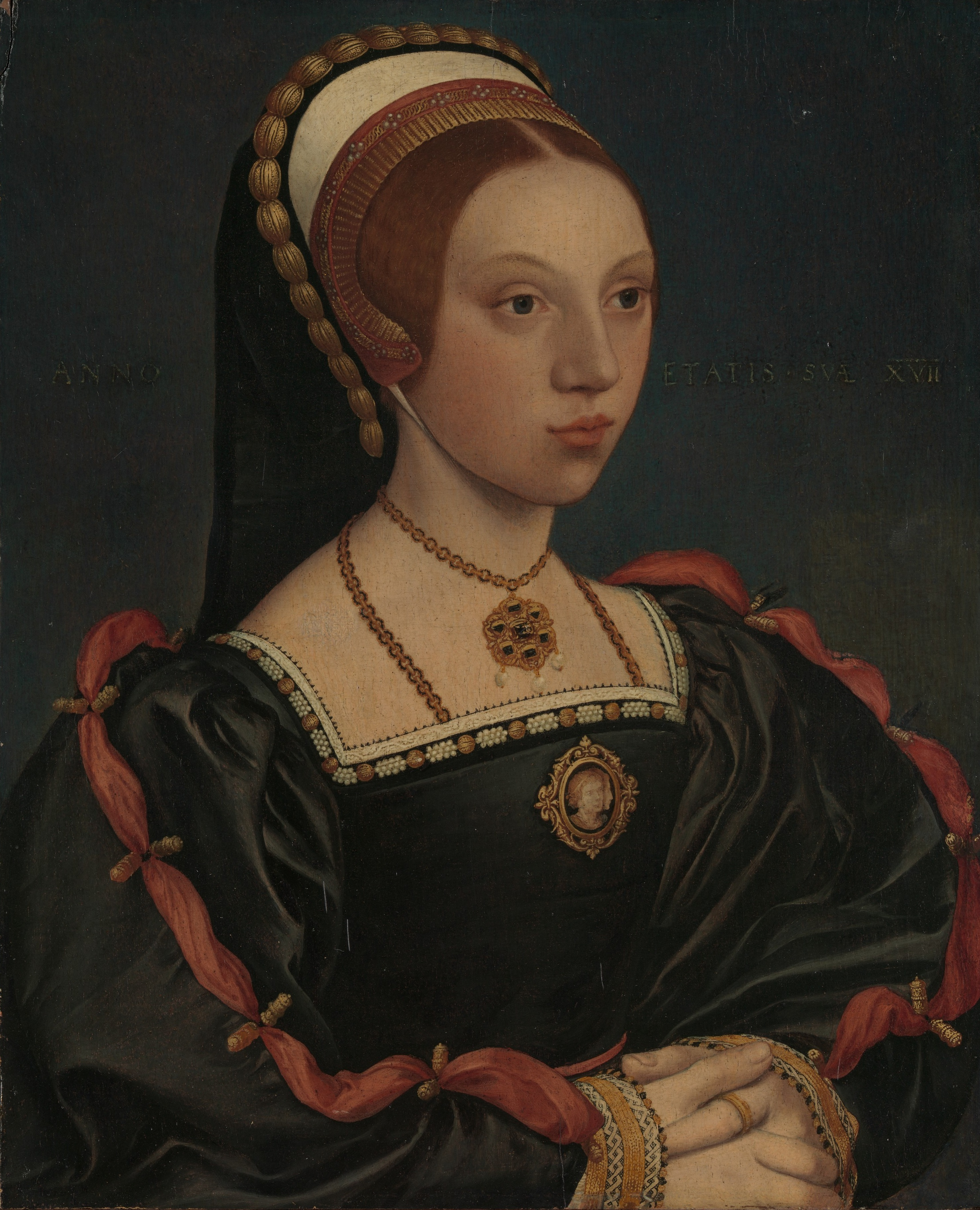
Katherine Howard, Jane Boleyn's cousin-in-law and queen of England, Henry VIII's fifth wife

After her husband's execution, Lady Rochford was absent from court for several months. She spent this time securing her financial position by negotiations with her father-in-law, Sir Thomas Boleyn, but mainly with Thomas Cromwell. The Boleyns eventually allocated her an annual pension of £100, precisely what they had given Mary Boleyn when she had been widowed eight years earlier. It was much less than her previous income, but it was enough to keep her as a noblewoman, which was essential for her return to court, something Jane worked doggedly for. It is unknown when she returned to court, but she was a lady-in-waiting to Queen Jane Seymour, so she probably returned within a year of her husband's death. As a viscountess, she was allowed to bring a number of her own servants with her, lodge in the King's palaces, and be addressed as "Lady Rochford".

Following Jane Seymour's death, the King subsequently married Anne of Cleves, a German princess recommended by Cromwell. However, Henry soon wanted to be rid of Anne, and sought an annulment. In July 1540, Lady Rochford testified that the Queen had confided in her that the marriage had never been consummated. This allowed the King to annul the marriage and marry Katherine Howard, who was related to the Boleyn family through the Howards.

Lady Rochford kept her post as lady-in-waiting, now to Queen Katherine. Queen Katherine's past indiscretions were uncovered in the autumn of 1541, and her private life was investigated. The Queen was first detained in her apartments and then placed under house arrest at Syon Abbey, a disused convent. Her confidantes and favourites were questioned and their rooms searched. Lady Rochford was herself detained for questioning, implicated in arranging meetings between the Queen and Thomas Culpeper. Jane Rochford was interviewed on 13 November 1541.

After her arrest, an inventory was made over her possessions.

=== Downfall and execution ===
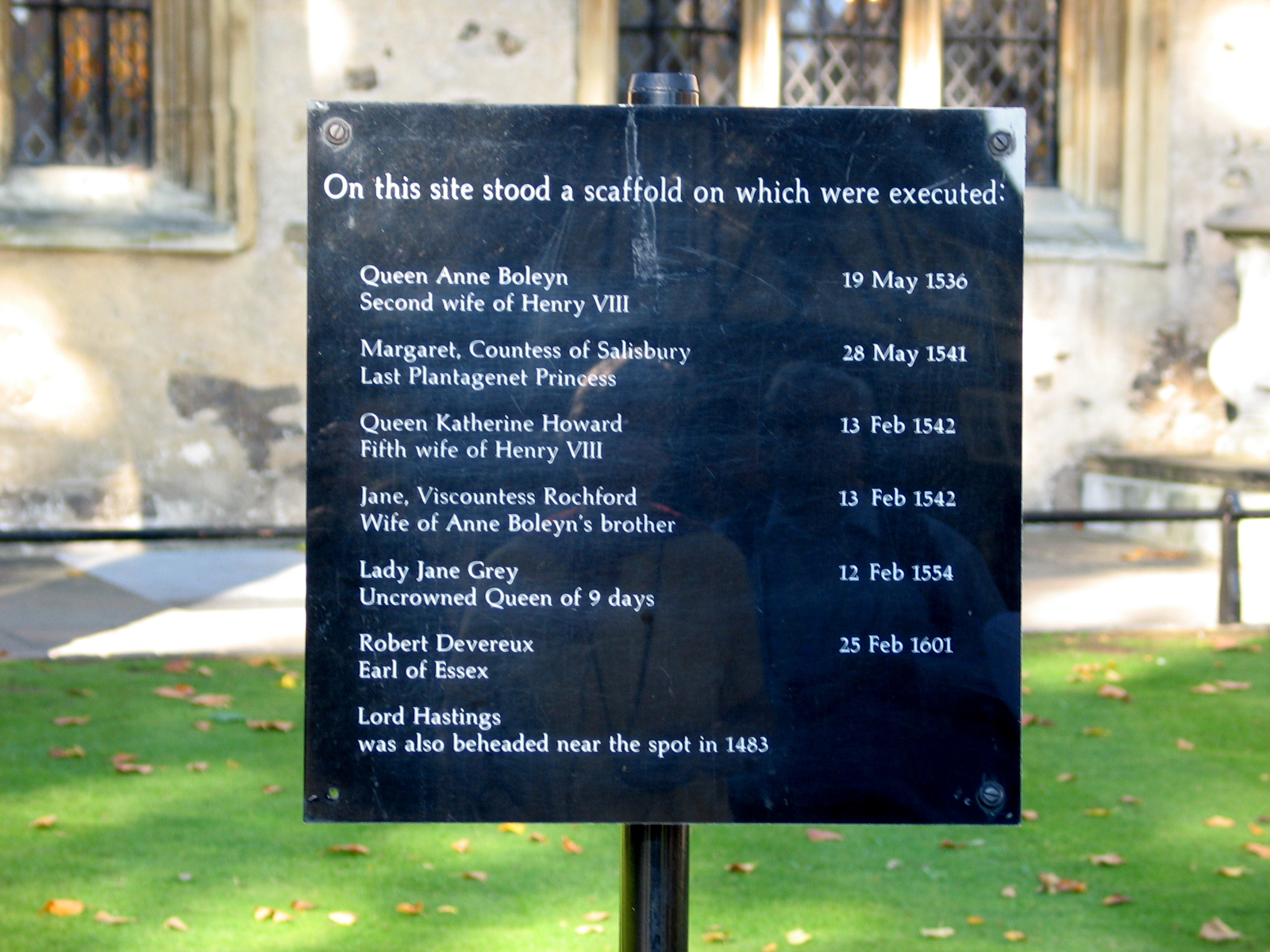
Sign at the scaffold of the Tower of London marking Lady Rochford's place of execution.

During her imprisonment in the Tower, Lady Rochford was interrogated but was not tortured. However, she seems to have suffered a nervous breakdown and by the beginning of 1542 was pronounced insane. Her "fits of frenzy" meant that legally she could not stand trial for her role in facilitating the Queen's alleged adultery, but since he was determined to have her punished, the King implemented a law which allowed the execution of the insane for high treason. Jane was thus condemned to death by an Act of Attainder, and the execution date was set for 13 February 1542, the same day as Queen Katherine's execution.

The Queen died first, apparently in a weak physical state, although she was not hysterical. Jane was then escorted from her lodgings to the scaffold where she spoke before kneeling on the just-used scaffold. Despite her nervous collapse over the previous months, she was calm and dignified and both women won mild posthumous approval for their behaviour. One eyewitness, a merchant named Ottwell Johnson, wrote that their 'souls [must] be with God, for they made the most godly and Christian end.' The French ambassador Charles de Marillac merely stated that Jane gave a 'long discourse'; Johnson says that she apologised for her 'many sins', but neither man's account supports the later legend that she spoke at length about her late husband or sister-in-law.

Jane was beheaded with a single blow of the axe and was buried in the church of St Peter ad Vincula within the Tower of London alongside Queen Katherine, close to the bodies of Anne Boleyn and Jane's husband George Boleyn.

== Genealogical table ==
Jane Boleyn's relatives (selective chart)

Cecily Neville; 1415 – 1495	Richard of York; 1411 – 1460	Robert Morley; 1418 – 1442	Elizabeth de Ros c. 1418 –	Oliver St John; C. 1400 - 1437	Margaret Beauchamp; C. 1410 - 1482	John Beaufort; 1403 – 1444	Owen Tudor c. 1400 – 1461	Catherine of Valois c. 1401 – 1437	Henri V c. 1386 – 1422
Richard III; 1452 – 1485	Edward IV; 1442 – 1483	Elizabeth of York; 1444 – 1503	John de la Pole; 1442 – 1492	Alianore Morley c. 1442 - 1476	William Lovel c. 1433 - 1476	Alice Bradshaw; 1426 – 1511	John St. John; 1426 – 1488	Margaret Beaufort; 1443 – 1509	Edmond Tudor; 1430 – 1456	Henri VI c. 1386 – 1422
Thomas Howard; C. 1443 – 1524	Elizabeth Tilney; 1446 – 1497	Elizabeth de la Pole c. 1468 – 1489	Henry Lovel; 1466 – 1489	Alice Lovel; C. 1463 – 1518	William Parker; C. 1465 – 1510	John St. John; 1450– 1525	Sybil verch Morgan; C. 1450 – ?	Henry VII; 1457 – 1509	Elizabeth of York; 1466 – 1503
Edmund Howard c. 1478 – 1539	Joyce Culpeper c. 1480 – 1528	Elizabeth Howard c. 1480 – 1538	Thomas Boleyn c. 1477 – 1539	Alice St John c. 1460 – ?	Henry Parker c. 1486 – 1556	Alice St. John c. 1484 – 1552	Arthur Tudor; 1486 – 1502	Catalina d'Aragon; 1485 – 1536	Henry VIII; 1491 – 1547	Marie Tudor; 1496 – 1533
Katherine Howard; C. 1524 – 1542	Jane Boleyn c. 1505 - 1542	George Boleyn; C. 1503 - 1536	Mary Boleyn; C. 1499 - 1543	Anne Boleyn; C. 1501 – 1536	Jane Seymour; C. 1508 – 1537
Mary I 1516 - 1558	Elizabeth I 1533 - 1603	Edward VI; 1537 - 1553

== In fiction and media ==
=== Literature ===
Lady Rochford has appeared in numerous novels, especially those on Anne Boleyn and Catherine Howard. Vengeance Is Mine by Brandy Purdy is written from Lady Rochford's viewpoint. She also features in Robin Maxwell's The Secret Diary of Anne Boleyn, Suzannah Dunn's The Queen of Subtleties and briefly in Margaret George's The Autobiography of Henry VIII. Jane's character is also mentioned in Wendy J. Dunn's Dear Heart, How Like You This? which is based on the life of the poet Thomas Wyatt. Rochford is a minor character in Sovereign, the third instalment of C. J. Sansom's Shardlake series of murder mystery novels. A larger role is given to Lady Rochford in Jean Plaidy's novel The Rose Without a Thorn. Jane Rochford also appears in the Thomas Cromwell trilogy Wolf Hall by Hilary Mantel.

Jane appears in the historical novel The Other Boleyn Girl by Philippa Gregory, which tells the story of her other sister-in-law, Mary Boleyn. One of its sequels is The Boleyn Inheritance, which casts Lady Rochford as one of its lead characters and its central villain. It details the final three years of her life and her involvement with Anne of Cleves and Katherine Howard. Jane is the main character in the sequel to The Other Boleyn Girl, Boleyn Traitor. The Raven's Widow by Adrienne Dillard takes a very different tack to previous portrayals - Lady Rochford is shown as a beloved wife and close friend to the Boleyns, her later role in the relationship between Katherine Howard and Thomas Culpeper coming about because of the trauma of her husband's death and the knowledge that disobedience comes at a price.

=== Film and TV ===
In the 1970 BBC series The Six Wives of Henry VIII starring Keith Michell as Henry, Sheila Burrell portrayed Lady Rochford.

In the 2003 TV drama Henry VIII, Lady Rochford was played by Kelly Hunter. In the 2008 film adaptation of Philippa Gregory's novel The Other Boleyn Girl, Jane Boleyn (played by Juno Temple) was a minor character. In both these representations, Jane was shown as being a political tool in the hands of her husband's uncle, the Duke of Norfolk, although the presentation of her in The Other Boleyn Girl was more sympathetic. In the 2003 TV adaptation of Gregory's novel, Jane was played by Zoe Waites.

Jane is also represented in seasons two to four of the Showtime series The Tudors, by Joanne King with Padraic Delaney playing her husband George. In this version, their marriage is miserable, with both pressured into it by their parents and Jane finding it increasingly humiliating to put up with her husband's affair with Mark Smeaton. They are shown frequently arguing and there is one incident of marital rape. However, Jane is not shown as hating Anne and so her betrayal of the Boleyns is motivated by her hatred of George. She befriends Jane Seymour when she becomes Queen, is made her lady-in-waiting and remains a close friend until Queen Jane's death. She remains chief lady-in-waiting, first to Anne of Cleves and then Katherine Howard. She eventually enters into a sexual relationship with Thomas Culpeper, for which there is no known historical basis. She facilitates the affair between Culpeper and Katherine, motivated both by a desire to keep Culpeper (who has a pathological obsession with the young Queen) and out of contempt for Katherine.

In Wolf Hall, a TV mini-series adaptation of the historical novel by Hilary Mantel, she was played by Jessica Raine. Her portrayal, while consistent with negative depictions of her, also stems from the disrespect and neglect she is shown experiencing from both Anne and George Boleyn, which makes her a ready accomplice to the intrigues of Thomas Cromwell.

In Wolf Hall: The Mirror and the Light, she was played by Lydia Leonard. Leonard starred in the stage adaptation of Hilary Mantel's Bring Up the Bodies as Anne.

== Sources ==
- Block, Joseph S. (2004). "Boleyn, George, Viscount Rochford". Oxford Dictionary of National Biography (online ed.). Oxford University Press. doi:10.1093/ref:odnb/2793. (Subscription, Wikipedia Library access or UK public library membership required.)
- Bruce, Marie Louise (1972). Anne Boleyn. London: Collins. ISBN 0002110482.
- "Calendar of State Papers, Spain". British-history.ac.uk.
- Cherry, Clare; Ridgway, Claire (2014). George Boleyn: Tudor Poet, Courtier & Diplomat. MadeGlobal Publishing. ISBN 978-8493746452.
- Cokayne, George Edward (1945). The Complete Peerage of England, Scotland, Ireland, Great Britain and the United Kingdom: Extant, Extinct or Dormant. Vol. X. London: St. Catherine Press. pp. 137–142.
- Cokayne, George Edward (1949). White, Geoffrey H. (ed.). The Complete Peerage of England, Scotland, Ireland, Great Britain and the United Kingdom: Extant, Extinct or Dormant. Vol. XI. London: St. Catherine Press. p. 51.
- Davies, Catherine (2004). "Boleyn [née Parker], Jane, Viscountess Rochford". Oxford Dictionary of National Biography (online ed.). Oxford University Press. doi:10.1093/ref:odnb/70799. (Subscription, Wikipedia Library access or UK public library membership required.)
- Ellis, Henry (1825). Original Letters Illustrative of English History. Second Series. Vol. II (2nd ed.). London: Harding and Lepard.
- Erickson, Carolly (1984). Mistress Anne. New York: Summit Books. ISBN 9780671417475.
- Fox, Julia (2008). Jane Boleyn: The Infamous Lady Rochford. London: Phoenix. ISBN 978-0-7538-2386-6.
- Gairdner, James (1885). "Anne (1507–1536)". In Stephen, Leslie (ed.). Dictionary of National Biography. Vol. 1. London: Smith, Elder & Co. pp. 425–429.
- Heylyn, Peter (1660). Ecclesiae Restaurata; or, the History of the Reformation of the Church of England: Containing the Biginning, Progress, and Successes of It; ... from the First Preparations to it by King Henry the Eight, Untill the Legal Settling, and Establishment of it Under Queen Elizabeth: Together ... Vol. 2. London: Printed for H. Twyford, T. Dring, J. Place, W. Palmer.
- Ives, E. W. (2004). "Anne [Anne Boleyn]". Oxford Dictionary of National Biography (online ed.). Oxford University Press. doi:10.1093/ref:odnb/557. (Subscription, Wikipedia Library access or UK public library membership required.)
- "Letters and Papers, Foreign and Domestic, Henry VIII". British-history.ac.uk.
- Norton, Elizabeth (2011). Anne Boleyn: In Her Own Words & the Words of Those Who Knew Her. Stroud: Amberley. ISBN 9781445600437.
- Richardson, Douglas (2011). Everingham, Kimball G. (ed.). Plantagenet Ancestry: A Study in Colonial and Medieval Families (2nd ed.). CreateSpace. ISBN 978-1461045137.
- Starkey, David (2004). Six Wives: the Queens of Henry VIII. London: Vintage Books. ISBN 9780099437246.
- Warnicke, Retha M. (1991). The Rise and Fall of Anne Boleyn: family politics at the court of Henry VIII. Cambridge: Cambridge University Press. ISBN 0521406773.
- Weir, Alison (2011). Henry VIII: King and Court. New York: Random House. ISBN 9781446449233.
- Weir, Alison (2011). The Six Wives of Henry VIII. New York: Random House. ISBN 9781446449097.
- Wyatt, George (1968). Loades, David (ed.). The Papers of George Wyatt Esquire, of Boxley Abbey in the County of Kent, Son and Heir of Sir Thomas Wyatt the Younger. Camden Fourth Series. Vol. 5. Edited for the Royal Historical Society by D. M. Loades. London: Offices of the Royal Historical Society. ISBN 9780901050014.
