= Thomas Morley, 4th Baron Morley =

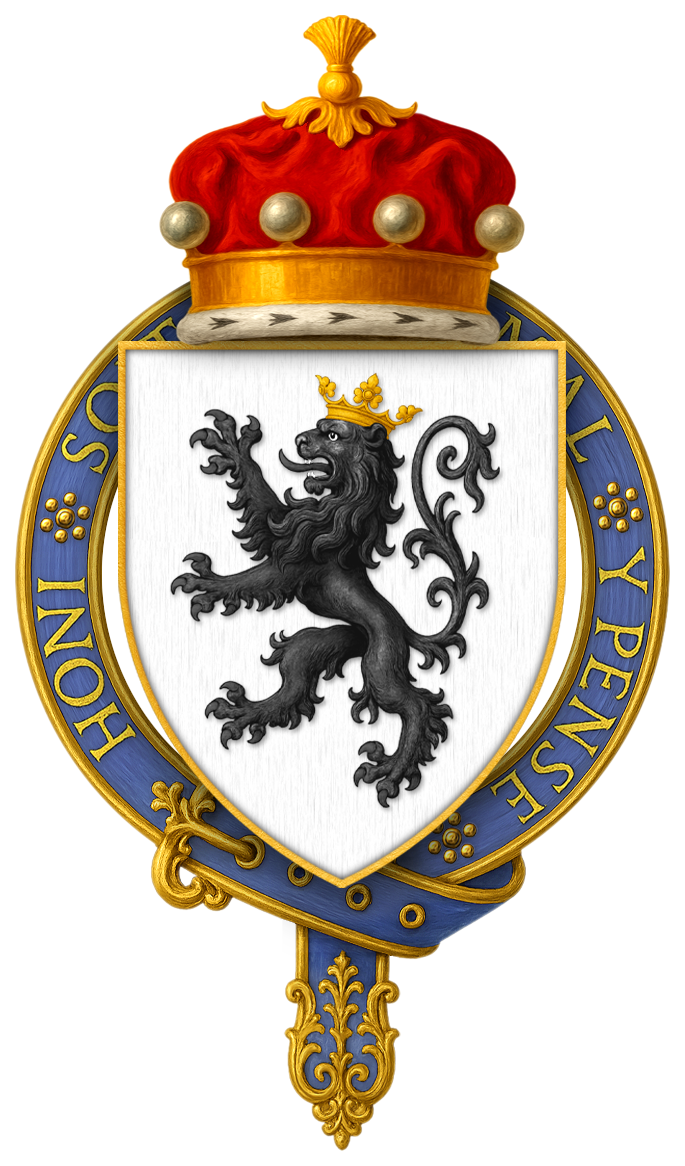
Arms of Sir Thomas de Morley, 4th Baron Morley, KG

Thomas de Morley, 4th Baron Morley, KG (c. 1354 – 24 September 1416) was a baron in the Peerage of England, Lord of Morley, Hingham, Hockering, &c., in Norfolk, de jure Lord Marshall, hereditary Earl Marshal of Ireland, and a Privy Councillor. He was summoned to parliament from 20 October 1379 to 3 September 1416.

Thomas Morley was the second but eldest surviving son and heir of Sir William de Morley, 3rd Baron Morley (d. 30 April 1379) by his spouse Lady Cecily Bardolf (d. 23 November 1386), daughter of Thomas Bardolf, 2nd Baron Bardolf.

In 1375 he was a Knight serving in Brittany in the expedition of the Duke of Brittany and Earl of Cambridge. In 1386, upon rumours of an intended invasion, he was, as Lord Morley, the Chief Commissioner ordered to survey Great Yarmouth and make provisions for its defence.

In 1391 Lord Morley received permission to go on crusade in Prussia.

In 1399 he accompanied King Richard II on his disastrous journey to Ireland. In April 1415 as England prepared for war in France, Henry V appointed his brother, John, Duke of Bedford, to be Lieutenant of England in his absence, and Morley was appointed to serve on the duke's council. In 1416 he was Lieutenant and Captain-General of forces assembled to proceed to France.

Lord Morley died later that year at Calais, where he was lodging at the house of a merchant, After a service at the Church of Notre Dame in Calais, at which both King Henry V and Sigismund, Holy Roman Emperor, were present, his body was returned to England and buried in the Austin Friars Church at Norwich, Norfolk.

Lord Morley married three times:

- (1) before 3 April 1374, Joan de Hastings (Norfolk, 1357 - before 1380), daughter of Sir Hugh de Hastings, Knt. (died c. 1369), by Margaret de Everingham, daughter of Adam de Everingham 2nd Baron Everingham, by whom Lord Morley had one son, Sir Robert de Morley, Knt. (circa 1375 - before 12 November 1403), d.v.p., who married before August 1394 Isabel de Molines and had Thomas de Morley, 5th Baron Morley. She is buried in the Church of the White Friars, Norwich, Norfolk.
- (2) before 10 June 1380, Elizabeth (surname unknown).
- (3) before 21 October 1390 (date of Papal dispensation), Anne le Despencer, daughter of Edward le Despencer, 1st Baron le Despencer and Lady Elizabeth Burghersh and widow of Sir Hugh de Hastings, Knt., (d.1386), of Elsing, Norfolk. She died 30 October 1426, and was buried in the Church of the Austin friars, Norwich. By Lord Morley, she had no issue.

Court offices
Preceded by William de Morley	Earl Marshal of Ireland; 1379–1416	Succeeded by Thomas Morley
Peerage of England
Preceded by William de Morley	Baron Morley; 1379–1416	Succeeded by Thomas Morley
