= Henry Parker, 10th Baron Morley =

English peer and translator (1480–1556)

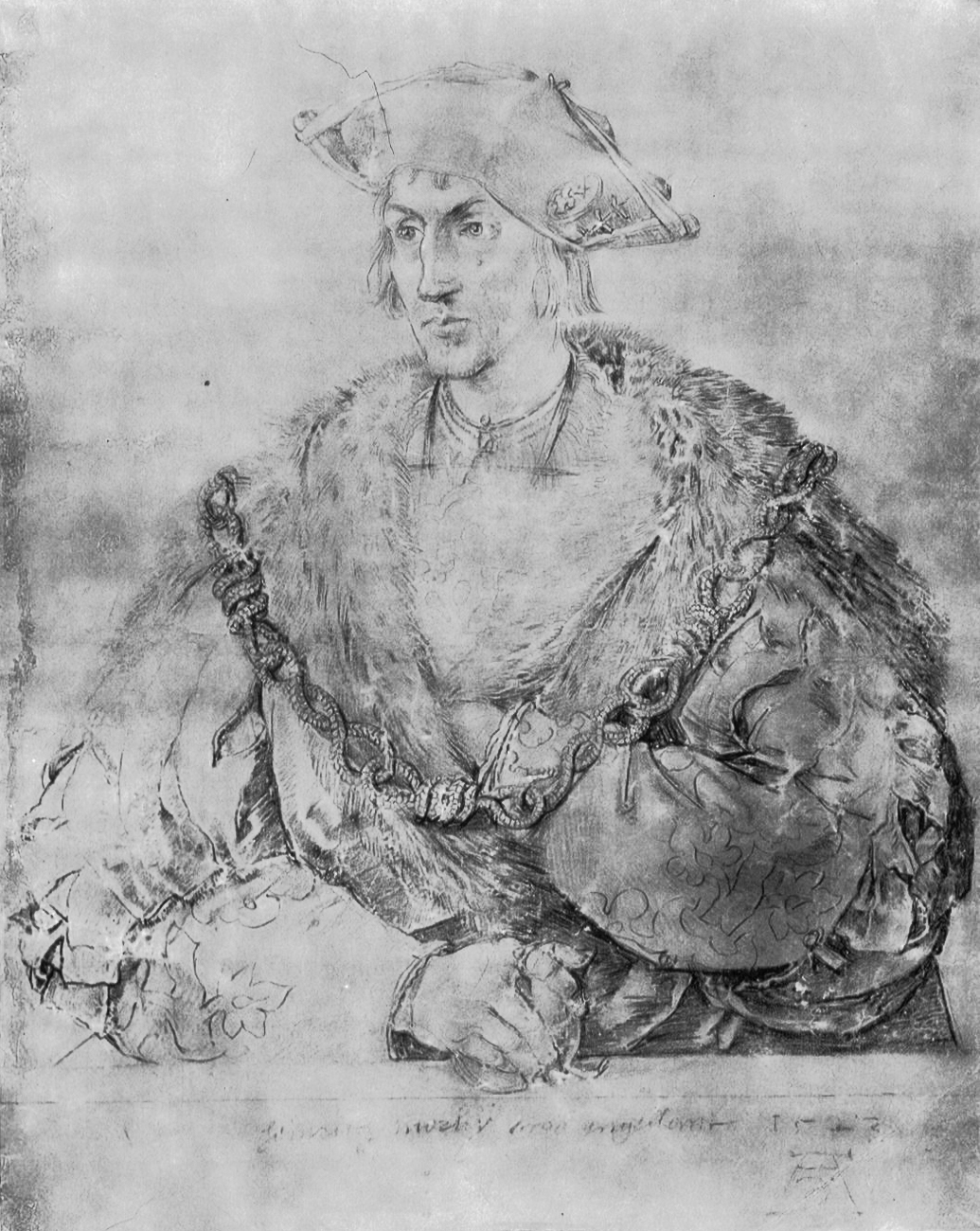
Henry Parker, Lord Morley (Albrecht Dürer, 1523)

Henry Parker, 10th Baron Morley (1476/1480/1481 – 3 December 1553/1556), (notes to Parliamentary records show this as 25 November 1556) was an English peer and translator, Lord of Morley, Hingham, Hockering and Norfolk.

== Life ==
He was the son of Alice Parker, 9th Baroness Morley, born Lovel (c. 1467–1518), and her husband Sir William Parker, who was privy counsellor and standard-bearer to King Richard III.

He married Alice St John, granddaughter of Sir John St John (1426–1498) and his wife Alice Bradshaigh, and thus a descendant of Sir Oliver St John and his wife Margaret Beauchamp—maternal grandmother of King Henry VII—by whom he had one son, Sir Henry Parker, who was knighted at the coronation of Anne Boleyn and died in his father's lifetime. The son of Sir Henry Parker, Henry, succeeded his grandfather as Baron Morley. Henry Parker, 10th Baron Morley, had two daughters: Margaret, who married John Shelton, and Jane, who married George Boleyn, Viscount Rochford, the brother of Henry VIII's second wife, Anne Boleyn.

His son, Sir Henry Parker, married Elizabeth Calthorpe (1521 – 26 May 1578), the daughter and heiress of Sir Philip Calthorpe of Erwarton in Suffolk (1480 – 17 April 1549) and Amata Boleyn (c.1485 – 1543+), the aunt of Anne Boleyn.

In 1523, he was sent as an ambassador to Germany to present the Order of the Garter to Archduke Ferdinand (later Ferdinand I, Holy Roman Emperor). He was a man of literary attainments and translated some of the writings of Plutarch, Seneca, Cicero and others into English. He was appointed Knight of the Bath on September 29, 1553.

Henry Parker served on the jury for various treason trials during the reign of Henry VIII, including the trial of his son-in-law, George Boleyn, and that of George's sister, Queen Anne Boleyn. Of the six people executed in Anne Boleyn's downfall, Henry Parker had links with half of them.
