= William Parker (privy counsellor) =

English privy counsellor and standard-bearer to King Richard III

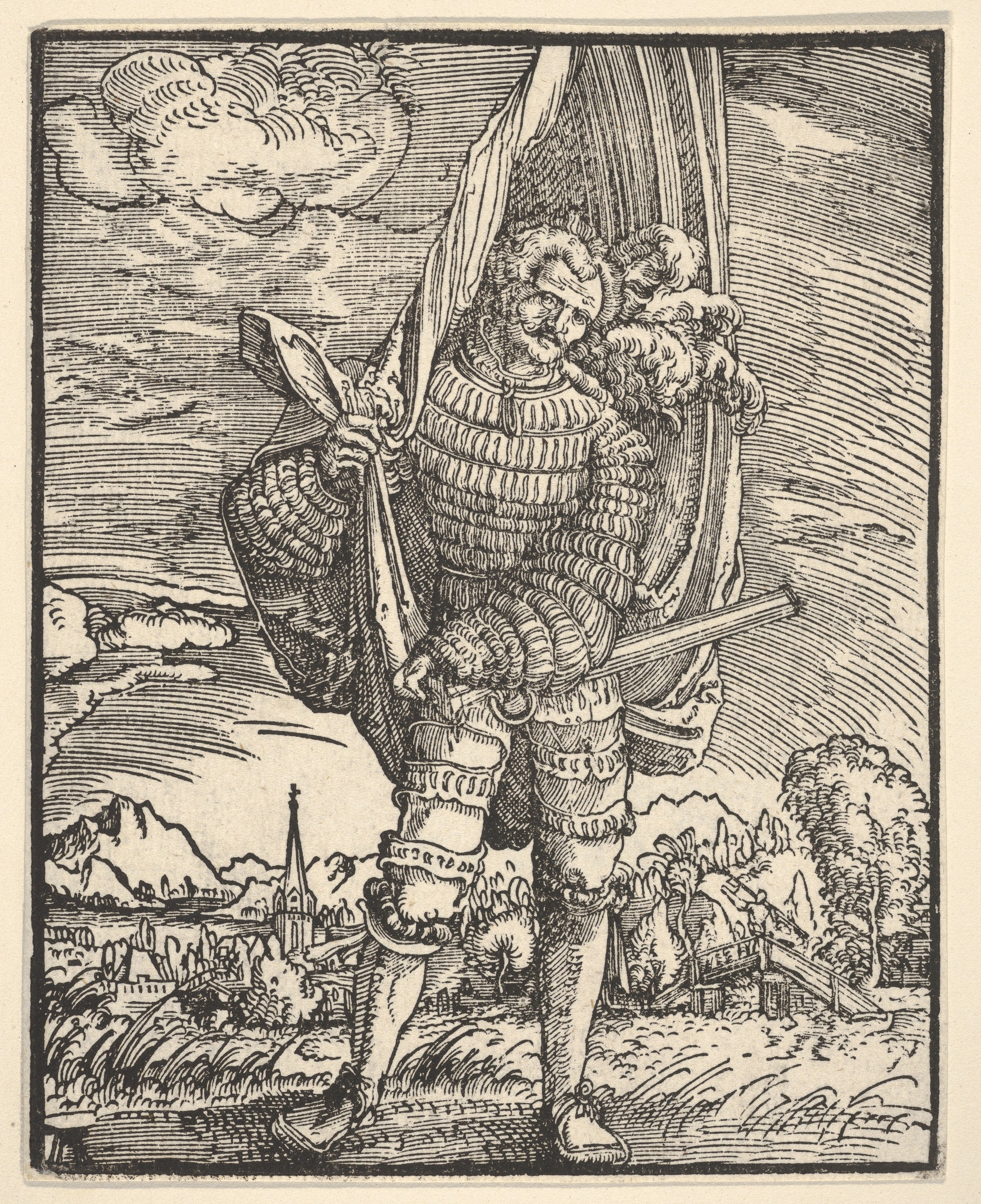
- Born: c. 1465
- Died: c.1510
- Noble family: Baron Morley
- Spouse: Alice Lovel, 9th Baroness Morley
- Father: John Parker
- Mother: Agnes Seymour
- Occupation: Privy counsellor and standard-bearer to Richard III

Sir William Parker (c. 1465 – 1510) was an English privy counsellor and standard-bearer to King Richard III.

== Biography ==
Sir William Parker was the father of Henry Parker and husband of Alice Lovel, 9th Baroness Morley (c. 1467–1518), daughter of Alianore Lovel, 7th Baroness Morley (1442–1476). He is closely associated to the royal family through his brother-in-law, Henry Lovel, whose wife, Elizabeth de la Pole, was a niece of Edward IV and Richard III.

Most of his property and assets came from his wife Alice who inherited it from her brother Henry. When Alianore and her husband William Lovel died on July 23, 1476, their 10-year-old son Henry Lovel was placed under guardianship. Some of the family estates were entrusted to the guardians, others were given to aristocrats, and others remained in the hands of King Richard III. Furthermore, some estates were also diverted to Sir Francis Lovel, William Lovel's nephew, despite the provisions drawn up by his great-grandfather on March 18, 1455.

Henri was 23 when he died at the battle of Dixmude, in Flanders, on June 13, 1489. On his death, his sister Alice Lovel and her husband William Parker inherited his noble titles and most of his properties. These included the manor and lordship of Great Hallingbury (Essex), the manor of Walkern (Hertfordshire), the manors of Hingham and Buxston, and the manor of Morley Hall in the Forehoe hundreds of Norfolk.

Sir William was a fervent supporter of Richard III. He rose to prominence during the English invasion of Scotland (1482) and was knighted on July 24, 1482, by Richard III. He was also rewarded for his help in suppressing Buckingham's rebellion in October 1483.

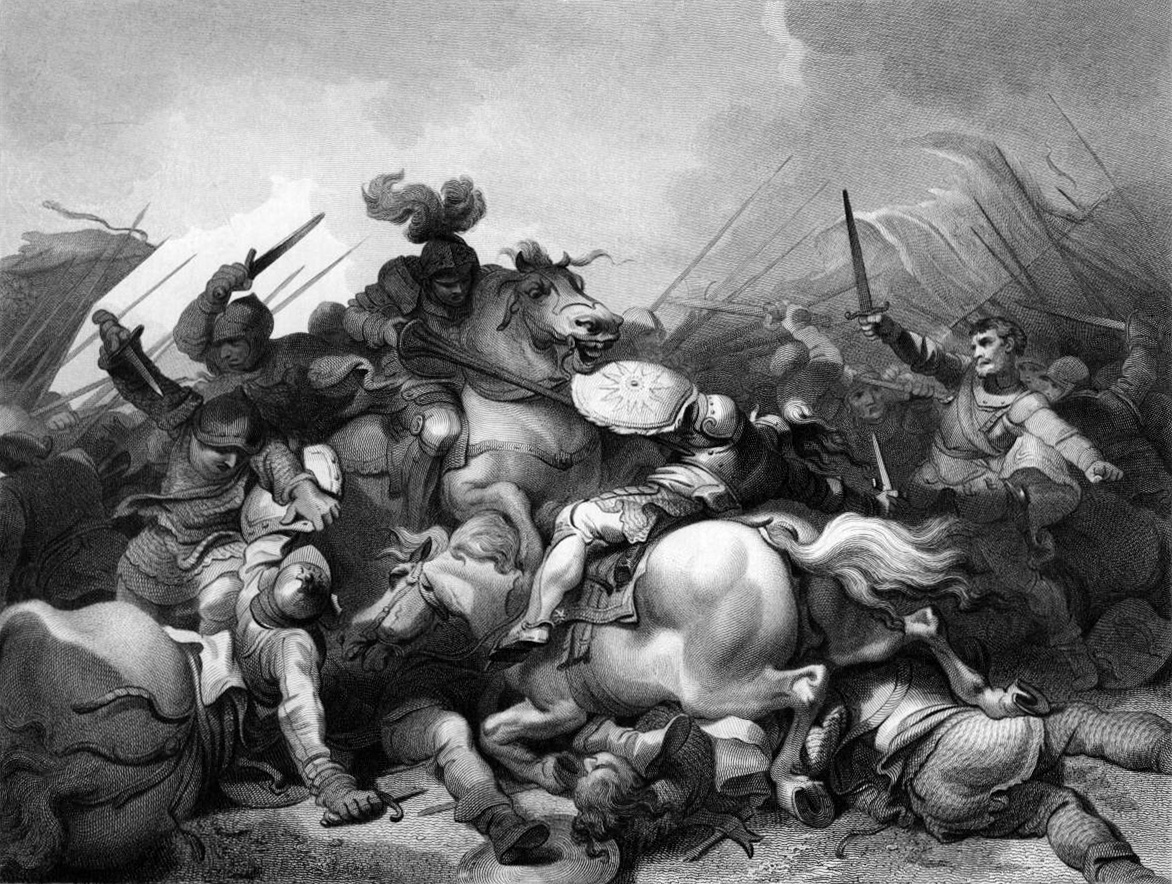
Battle of Bosworth by Philip James de Loutherbourg

He became Richard III's standard-bearer, fighting with him on August 22, 1485, at the Battle of Bosworth against Henry Tudor. Henry Tudor was victorious and subsequently became King of England as Henry VII. Sir William's devotion to Richard III naturally earned him Henry VII's disfavor and, according to family legend, he "lived the king's prisoner " after the War of the Roses.

In 1493, Sir William Parker suffered a first attack of dementia. He seems to have recovered, at first, but in 1502 he suffered from insanity. His epitaph states that he died a violent, unspecified death. He was buried in the parish of St Gilles, in the village of Great Hallingbury, in the company of his wife Alice, his son Henry, his daughter-in-law Alice St John, his mother Agnes and his sister-in-law Elisabeth de la Pole, niece of Edward IV and Richard III.

After his death, his widow, Alice Lovel, quickly remarried Edward Howard, a British naval officer and the youngest son of the Earl of Surrey. To be sure that Henry Parker, Alice's son, would not be totally dispossessed of his inheritance, Margaret Beaufort paid Edward Howard 500 marks. Sir Edward Howard drowned on April 25, 1513, in a sea battle off Le Conquet. Alice Lovel died five years later.

== Genealogical table ==
William Lovel's relatives (selective chart)

Robert Morley; 1418 – 1442	Elizabeth de Ros c. 1418 –	William Lovel; 7th Lord Lovel c. 1397 – 1455	Alice Deincourt; 1404 – 1474
Alianore Morley c. 1442 - 1476	William Lovel c. 1427 - 1476	John Lovell; 8th Lord Lovell c. 1433 - 1465	Joan Beaumont c. 1435 - 1466	Robert Lovell ? - 1461	Henry Lovell c. 1433 - 1465
Elizabeth de la Pole c. 1468 – 1489	Henry Lovel; 1466 – 1489	Alice Lovel c. 1463 – 1518	William Parker c. 1465 – 1510	Francis Lovell; 9th Baron Lovell; 1454 – c. 1485	Joan Lovel; 1457 – 1485	Frideswide Lovel; 1466 – 1507
Henry Parker c. 1486 – 1556
