= Robert Morley (disambiguation) =

Robert Morley (1908–1992) was an English actor.

Robert Morley may also refer to:

- Bob Morley (born 1984), Australian actor and television director
- Robert Morley (died 1632), English merchant and politician
- Robert Morley (trade unionist) (1863–1931), British trade unionist and politician
- Robert Morley, 2nd Baron Morley, English naval officer
- Robert Morley, 6th Baron Morley (1418–1442), English baron
