= Lord Morley =

Lord Morley may refer to:

- Baron Morley, a title in the Peerage of England in use from 1295 until 1697
- John Morley, 1st Viscount Morley of Blackburn (1838–1923), British statesman and journalist
