= Claire Ridgway =

British historian

Claire Ridgway FRHistS
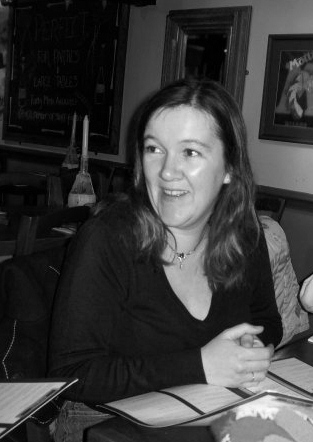
- Born: Claire Brassington; 11 February 1971 (age 55); Lancashire, UK
- Education: Alcester Grammar School
- Alma mater: University of Warwick
- Occupations: Author, historian
- Spouse: Tim Ridgway (m. 1995)
- Children: Christian (born 1997); Verity (born 2000); Joel (born 2002)
- Writing career
- Language: English
- Genre: History
- Notable works: The Fall of Anne Boleyn: A Countdown; The Anne Boleyn Collection; On This Day in Tudor History
- Website: theanneboleynfiles.com

Claire Ridgway FRHistS (née Brassington; born 11 February 1971) is a British historian and author of books about the Tudor dynasty, with a particular focus on the life of the Boleyn family. Since 2009 she has run the websites TheAnneBoleynFiles.com and Elizabethfiles.com. In 2014, Claire founded The Tudor Society.

== Early life and education ==
Ridgway was born in Lancashire in 1971, her father was a headteacher and her mother was a housewife. She credits her primary school teacher, Mr. Taylor, for setting her off in her love of literature and history.

She graduated from the University of Warwick with a BA Hons. with Qualified Teacher Status (QTS) in Religion and Education in 1993.

Ridgway met her husband, Timothy Ridgway, at university and the couple married in 1995. They have three children and Ridgway opted to give up her teaching career to be a full-time mother for 10 years before returning to her career.

== Early career ==
- Primary School Teacher – 1993–1996
- Freelance Writer – 2008–2009
- Historian, author, blogger and vlogger – 2009–present

== Historian, author, blogger and vlogger ==
I fully admit to being addicted to Anne Boleyn and Tudor history and I am on a crusade to debunk the myths surrounding Anne Boleyn and educate the world about the REAL Anne Boleyn

— Claire Ridgway on Anne Boleyn

In 2009, Ridgway set up her Tudor history website, www.TheAnneBoleynFiles.com, and it rapidly grew into a major website for the study of the Tudor period. Through her website, Ridgway was involved in running historical tours through her company History Tours of Britain. The first tour was in 2010, with subsequent tours until 2012. These tours were based around Hever Castle in Kent, with notable guest speakers such as Eric Ives, John Guy, Julia Fox and Elizabeth Norton. The company was closed due to Ridgway wanting to focus on her writing.

Ridgway's first book, The Anne Boleyn Collection (2012), was a collection of the top articles from her website. Ridgway quickly followed her first book with a more in-depth study of the lead-up to the execution of Anne Boleyn. This book, The Fall of Anne Boleyn (2012), shows the brutal speed that Anne Boleyn was taken from power, and sold 69,000 copies in its first two years.

Putting together her detailed research into the Tudor period, Ridgway's third book, On This Day in Tudor History (2012), is a larger book with 366 entries about things that happened during the reign of the Tudors. It includes notable births, deaths, coronations and interesting trivia. This book sold 12,000 copies within its first year.

Claire's blog, recently made available in book form, is more rigorous than that of many professional historians

— Susan Bordo, author of "The Creation of Anne Boleyn"

In 2013, Ridgway published a second instalment of The Anne Boleyn Collection. However, in this book she was able to publish articles that had only been seen by her private members-only website, making this book of more interest to her readers. In its first six months, the book has sold over 3500 copies.

Through her research into Anne Boleyn, Ridgway became interested in George Boleyn, the brother of Anne Boleyn. Her book, written jointly with Clare Cherry, George Boleyn: Tudor Poet, Courtier and Diplomat, fleshed out George as a popular and well-liked courtier from the court of Henry VIII, continuing Ridgway's aim to clarify what is known about the Tudor period. This book was the first modern biography of George Boleyn, the last biography was written over 100 years ago by a French ambassador, Edmond Bapst. This book was published in 2014. Ridgway went on to work with J A Macfarlane on a translation of Bapst's book on George Boleyn and Henry Howard, Two Gentleman Poets at the Court of Henry VIII (2013).

Ridgway's other published works include Illustrated Kings and Queens of England (2014), Sweating Sickness in a Nutshell (2014), Tudor Places of Great Britain (2015), The Life of Anne Boleyn Colouring Book (2018), The Anne Boleyn Collection III (2019) and The Tudor Puzzle Book (2021).

In 2021, Ridgway published The Boleyns of Hever Castle with castle historian and assistant curator, Dr. Owen Emmerson. This book takes readers through the Boleyns' 77 years of ownership of Hever Castle and tells their story. Ridgway was elected a Fellow of the Royal Historical Society in the same year.

Ridgway also has an active YouTube channel that had over 61,000 subscribers as of October 2021. Her videos include On This Day in Tudor History, in which she looks back at Tudor events and videos on the Boleyn family.

== Bibliography ==
- The Anne Boleyn Collection (2012)
- The Fall of Anne Boleyn: A Countdown (2012)
- On This Day in Tudor History (2012)
- Interviews with Indie Authors (2012)
- The Anne Boleyn Collection II (2013)
- Two Gentleman Poets at the Court of Henry VIII, Edmond Bapst (2013, translated from the original French)
- George Boleyn: Tudor Poet, Courtier and Diplomat (2014)
- Illustrated Kings and Queens of England (2014)
- Sweating Sickness in a Nutshell (2014)
- Tudor Places of Great Britain (2015)
- The Life of Anne Boleyn Colouring Book (2018)
- The Anne Boleyn Collection III (2019)
- The Tudor Puzzle Book (2021)
- The Boleyns of Hever Castle (2021)
- On This Day in Tudor History II (2022)
- On This Day in Tudor History III (2025)
