= Henry Parker (MP for Hertfordshire) =

English politician (1514–1552)

Sir Henry Parker (by 1514 – 6 January 1552), of Morley Hall, Hingham, Norfolk and Furneux Pelham, Hertfordshire, was an English politician.

== Life ==
Henry Parker was the son of Henry Parker, Baron Morley. His sister was Jane Boleyn née Parker, who married George Boleyn, the brother of Anne Boleyn. He served as a page to King Henry VIII of England, and was present in 1520 at the Field of the Cloth of Gold as part of the royal household.

Paker was knighted on 31 May 1533. He was named as High Sheriff of Essex and Hertfordshire for 1536–1537, although it is not clear if he actually served. He was a justice of the peace for Hertfordshire from 1537 to his death. He was also Custos Rotulorum of Hertfordshire from around 1547 until his death. He was elected a member (MP) of the Parliament of England for Hertfordshire in 1539 and 1547.

In the dissolution of the monasteries, in 1536, Parker was granted the lands of Latton Priory at Latton in Essex. He took part in the funeral of Jane Seymour in 1537.

Parker married twice. His first wife was Grace, the daughter and heiress of John Newport. Parker and Grace had at least two sons and a daughter, including Henry and Alice who married Thomas Barrington. He married second Elizabeth, the daughter and heiress of Philip Calthorpe of Erwarton, Suffolk. They had a son, Philip, who inherited the manor of Erwarton from her.

Parker died 6 January 1552 during his father's lifetime, leaving his son Henry as the heir to the barony.
