= Morley, Norfolk =

Civil parish in Norfolk, England

Coordinates: 52.557°N 1.060°E

Morley
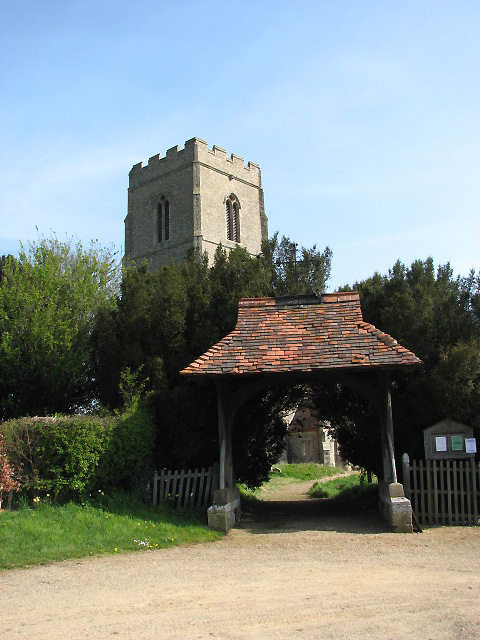
- Morley St Botolph

- Location within Norfolk
- Area: 8.21 km^{2} (3.17 sq mi)
- Population: 1,241 (2011)
  - Density: 151/km^{2} (390/sq mi)
- OS grid reference: TM075998
- Civil parish: Morley
- District: South Norfolk
- Shire county: Norfolk
- Region: East
- Country: England
- Sovereign state: United Kingdom
- Post town: WYMONDHAM
- Postcode district: NR18
- Dialling code: 01953
- Police: Norfolk
- Fire: Norfolk
- Ambulance: East of England

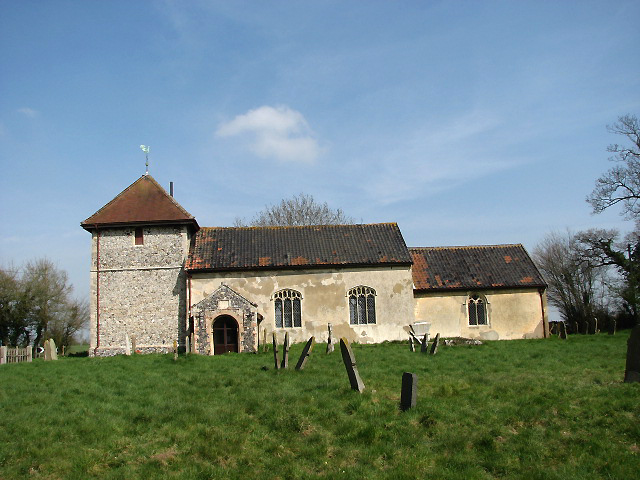
Morley St Peter

Morley is a civil parish in the South Norfolk district, in the county of Norfolk, England. It includes the villages of Morley St Botolph and Morley St Peter. It covers an area of 8.21 km^{2} (3.17 sq mi) and had a population of 973 in 182 households at the 2001 census, increasing to a population of 1.241 in 191 households at the 2011 census.

== History ==
The name is first attested in 1086 as Morlea, which probably meant "open ground by a pasture/clearing", from Old English mōr "moor, clearing, pasture" + lẽah "open ground, clearing".

The parish was formed on 1 April 1935 from "Morley St Botolph" and "Morley St Peter".

== See also ==
- Wymondham College
