= John Guy (historian) =

British historian and biographer (born 1949)

John Guy FRHistS
- Born: January 16, 1949 (age 77); Warragul, Victoria, Australia
- Occupations: Historian, biographer

Academic background
- Education: King Edward VII School
- Alma mater: Clare College, Cambridge

John Alexander Guy FRHistS (born 16 January 1949) is a British historian and biographer specialising in the early modern period.

== Biography ==
Born in Warragul, Victoria, Australia, Guy moved to Britain with his parents in 1952. He was educated at King Edward VII School in Lytham St Annes in Lancashire, and Clare College, Cambridge, where he read history, achieving a First in 1970. At Cambridge, Guy studied under the Tudor specialist Geoffrey Elton. He was awarded a Greene Cup by Clare College in 1970 and the Yorke Prize by the University of Cambridge in 1976. He was appointed a Research Fellow at Selwyn College in 1970, completing his PhD on Thomas Wolsey in 1973.

During his academic career, Guy has held posts at St Andrews University (where he is Honorary Professor and was sometime Vice-Principal for Research), Bristol University, UC Berkeley, University of Rochester and Johns Hopkins. Guy currently teaches at Cambridge University, as a fellow of Clare College, where he teaches part-time so he can devote more time to his writing and broadcasting career.

Guy specializes in the history of Tudor England and has written extensively on the subject including juvenile books. His books have been critically acclaimed, with My Heart is My Own: the Life of Mary Queen of Scots, being awarded the 2004 Whitbread Biography Award. This book and Queen of Scots: The True Life of Mary Stuart served as inspiration for the 2018 film Mary Queen of Scots.

He is the author of A Daughter's Love: Thomas More and his daughter Meg, 2008, and Elizabeth: the forgotten years, 2016.

== Personal life ==
He is married to author Julia Fox, a former history teacher, who wrote Jane Boleyn: The Infamous Lady Rochford. She is his second wife. He was previously married and had a son, born in 1979, and a daughter, born in 1987.

== Bibliography ==
- Tudor England (1988). Oxford: Oxford University Press. ISBN 9780192852137.
- The Tudors: A Very Short Introduction (2000). Oxford: Oxford University Press. ISBN 0192854011
- My Heart is My Own: The Life of Mary, Queen of Scots (2004). New York City: Harper Perennial. ISBN 1841157538.
- Queen of Scots: The True Life of Mary Stuart (2005). Boston: Mariner Books. ISBN 0618619178.
- A Daughter's Love: Thomas & Margaret More (2008). London: Fourth Estate. ISBN 9780007192311.
- Thomas Becket: Warrior, Priest, Rebel, A 900-year-old story retold (2012). New York City: Viking Books. ISBN 0670918466.
- The Children of Henry VIII (2013). Oxford: Oxford University Press. ISBN 9780192840905.
- Henry VIII: The Quest for Fame (2014). London: Allen Lane. ISBN 0141977124.
- Elizabeth: The Forgotten Years (2016). New York City: Viking Books. ISBN 0670922250.
- Thomas More: A Very Brief History (2017). London: SPCK Publishing. ISBN 028107738X.
- Gresham's Law: The Life and World of Queen Elizabeth I's Banker (2019). London: Profile Books. ISBN 1788162366.
- Hunting the Falcon: Henry VIII, Anne Boleyn and the Marriage That Shook Europe, with Julia Fox. (2023). London: Bloomsbury Publishing. ISBN 1526631520
