= Grimston Manor =

Manor in Norfolk, England

Grimston Manor was a manor house in Norfolk, England. In 1524, it was given to George Boleyn, the first sole grant King Henry VIII made to Boleyn. It is assumed that this was given as a gift on the wedding of George to Jane Parker. Henry VIII was around this time involved in a relationship with George's sister, Mary, and within two years would be pursuing George's other sister, Anne, who became Henry VIII's second wife.

In the thirteenth century, it had belonged to John de Breccles.
