= Alcester Grammar School =

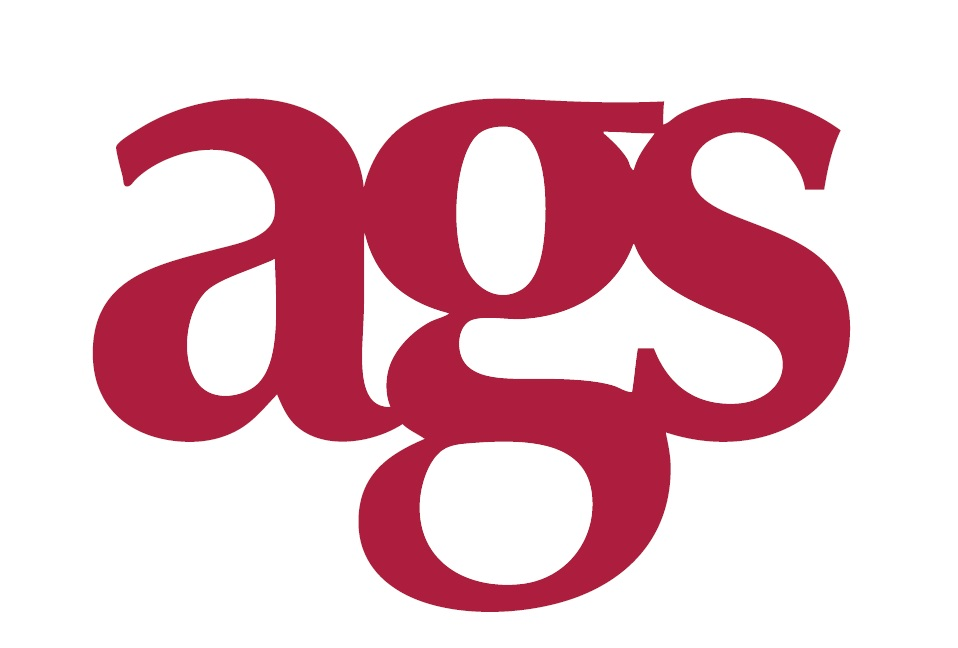
- Alcester Grammar School Logo

Location
- Birmingham Road; Alcester, Warwickshire, B49 5ED; England; 52.2185°N 1.8753°W

Information
- Type: Academy, Grammar
- Motto: Christus nobiscum state
- Established: c. 1499
- Local authority: Warwickshire County Council
- Department for Education URN: 136622 Tables
- Ofsted: Reports
- Chair of Governors: Clare Cockbill
- Principal: Rachel Thorpe
- Gender: Mixed
- Age: 11 to 18
- Enrolment: 1290
- Houses: Alder, Birch, Hawthorn, Oak and Willow.
- Colours: Red and Black
- Website: http://www.alcestergs.com

Alcester Grammar School (AGS) is a co-educational 11-18 maintained selective grammar school, situated in Alcester, Warwickshire, England. On 1 April 2011, Alcester Grammar School became the first school in south Warwickshire to achieve academy status.

== History ==
AGS was known as "Newport's Free School" from about 1592 until 1912 because Walter Newport provided in his will for the endowment which, in early years, paid the schoolmaster's stipend and enabled the scholars to be educated free of charge. Newport was a nephew of Sir Christopher Hatton, Lord Chancellor in 1597, and a relative of Robert, second Earl of Warwick. In 1912, the new coeducational school now known as Alcester Grammar School, on the site in Birmingham Road came into use. In 2012 AGS marked its Centenary with a host of celebratory events.

== Admissions ==
For admissions at age 11 to Year 7 of the school, the Governing Body participates in the Local Authority’s co-ordinated admissions scheme for maintained secondary schools. Admission to Year 7 is determined by the performance of candidates in an entrance examination and by the availability of places. Only students who attain the required standard in the prescribed arrangements for selection by reference to ability or aptitude will be eligible to be considered for admission to the school.

In September 2013 AGS increased its intake to 120 into Year 7, resulting in a 4 form entry of 30 students per form.

Since September 2016 the PAN for entry in year 7 has been 150 students, resulting in a 5 form entry of 30 students per form.

The priority circle for South Warwickshire Grammar Schools is based on the traditional area for application. It is based on a circle with a radius of 16.885 miles running from the Fountain in Rother Street, Stratford-upon-Avon to the County boundary south of Long Compton.

=== Sixth form ===
At age 16 (sixth form) additional students from a range of local schools are admitted.

== School achievements ==
In 2012 Ofsted graded the school's Mathematics department as Outstanding.

In its 2006 and 2009 Ofsted inspections the school was graded as Outstanding.

In December 2022, Ofsted graded the school as Outstanding.

== Notable alumni ==
- James Cooray Smith, writer.
- Simon Davis, comics artist
- Sarah Douglas, actress known for her role as Ursa in the Superman film series
- Gerry Mayhew, former Jaguar pilot, Station Commander from 2013 to 2015 of RAF Leuchars
- Wendy Padbury, actress, known from 1968-69 for her Zoe Heriot companion to the second Doctor Who Patrick Troughton
- Sadie Plant, founded the Cybernetic Culture Research Unit at the University of Warwick
- Andrew Pozzi, Olympic hurdler
- Claire Ridgway, writer
- Lucy Shepherd, footballer
