= Custos Rotulorum of Hertfordshire =

This is a list of people who have served as Custos Rotulorum of Hertfordshire.

- Sir Henry Parker bef. 1544–1552
- Sir Thomas Parry bef. 1558–1560
- Sir Ralph Sadler bef. 1562 – aft. 1579
- Sir John Brograve c. 1583–1613
- Sir Julius Caesar ? – bef. 1619
- William Cecil, 2nd Earl of Salisbury 1619 – aft. 1636
- Sir John Boteler 1642–1653
- Interregnum

For later custodes rotulorum, see Lord Lieutenant of Hertfordshire.
