= Lilian Leveridge =

British-born Canadian teacher and writer

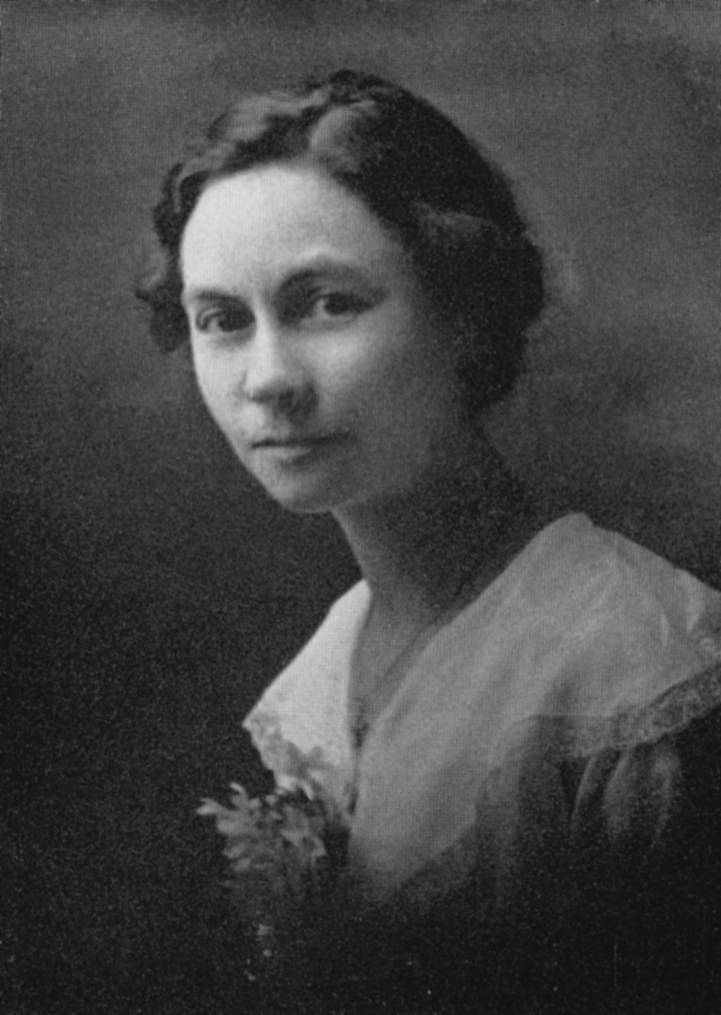
- Born: 15 April 1879; Hockering, Norfolk, England
- Died: 1953 (aged 73–74); Carrying Place, Ontario, Canada
- Occupations: teacher; writer
- Writing career
- Language: English
- Genres: articles; poetry; short stories

Lilian Leveridge (15 April 1879 – 1953) was a British-born Canadian teacher who became a writer, particularly of poetry, later in her career. In addition to six volumes of verse, she contributed articles, poems and short stories to various periodicals. Awards and recognition followed from the Canadian Literature Club of Toronto, Canadian Authors Association, and the McNab Poetry Award. Leveridge died in 1953.

== Early life and education ==
Lilian Leveridge was born in England, at the "Park Farm", near Hockering, Norfolk, April 15, 1879. Reverses of fortune led her father, David William Leveridge (1840-1929), to remove to Canada in 1882. On 9 July 1883, Lilian, her mother, Anna Maria Godbolt Leveridge (1846-1927), and her six siblings (Edward, Arthur, Florence, Gertrude, Catherine, John) (Note: Another brother, Frank, was born in Canada.) joined the father. The family settled in a one-room home on a 100 acres (40 ha) heavily timbered farm near Coe Hill, in the mining district of Wollaston Township, Hastings County, Ontario. Here, remote from church and school, for a time, she experienced the privations of pioneer life, but with the advantage of a refined home atmosphere and a devoted mother to guide her early education.

== Career ==
After a course at the Winnipeg Collegiate Institute, she taught school for a summer at Glenboro, Manitoba, and then returned to Ontario, where she continued teaching for some years. In 1914, the family removed to Carrying Place, in Prince Edward County, Ontario. Some years later, Leveridge took up business life in Toronto, but poor health obliged her in 1922 to relinquish this and return home.

The poems "Over the Hills of Home" (The Leader-Post, 1918) and "A Cry from the Canadian Hills" (for The Daily Ontario) were written by Leveridge as a tribute to her brother, Corporal Frank E. Leveridge, a member of the Thirty-ninth Canadian Battalion, who was wounded in action and died in France during World War I. "Over the Hills of Home" became the title poem for a slender volume, Over the Hills of Home, And Other Poems (E. P. Dutton & Co., 1918) of a score or more of poems which were of varying mood and of simple structure and sincere feeling. This was the first of six books published between 1918 and 1939.

Leveridge contributed short stories, articles, and poems to various periodicals. These included at least three published by Brantford's The Expositor ("The Way of the British", 1914; "Bob-o-Link", 1923; and "Hymn of Peace", 1937); and another three published in 1924 by The Windsor Star ("When the Lights Go Out", "Pipes of Pan", and "Gradation"). "Beckoning Worlds" was published in Canadian Poetry Magazine and reprinted in The Gazette, 1948. "I Would See Jesus" was published in The Canadian Churchman and reprinted in The Sun Times, 1939. Additional periodicals who published her verses included "Summer in the Heart" (The Daily Sun-Times, 1923); and "The Wind" (Vernon News, 1931). The Star-Chronicle mentioned that some of Leveridge's short stories appeared in the July 1909 edition of The Canadian Magazine. She was also a contributor to: Alberta Poetry Year Book, Canadian Bookman, Canadian Farmer, Canadian Home Journal, Christian Guardian, Delineator, Family Herald and Weekly Star, Mail and Empire, Montreal Poetry Year Book, New Outlook, Occult Digest, Ontario Farmer, Ontario Intelligencer, and Picton Gazette.

== Death and legacy ==
Lilian Leveridge died in Carrying Place, 1953. Archival holdings are held by Allison University, National Archives of Quebec, University of Calgary Libraries, Trent University Archives, Queen's University Archives, North York Central Library, and Ryerson University.

== Awards and recognition ==
- 193-, Archie McKishnie Award, Short Story Competition, Canadian Literature Club of Toronto
- 1937, Honourable mention (for "The Whitethroat"), Best Bird Poem Competition, Montreal Poetry Yearbook Contest, Canadian Authors Association
- 1945, 2nd place (for "Glamoresque") and 4th place (for "Open Gate"), McNab Poetry Award

== Selected works ==
- Over the Hills of Home, And Other Poems, 1918
- A Breath of the Woods, 1926
- The Hero Songs of Canada, 1927
- The Blossom Trail, 1932
- Still Waters, 1933
- Lyrics and Sonnets, 1939
