= Robert Morley, 6th Baron Morley =

Robert de Morley, 6th Baron Morley (20 November 1418 – 25 September 1442) was a baron in the Peerage of England, Lord of Morley, Hingham, Hockering, &c., in Norfolk.

He was the son of Thomas de Morley, 5th Baron Morley and Lady Isabel de la Pole. He married prior to May 1442, Elizabeth, daughter of William de Ros, 6th Baron de Ros. and died at age 23 without male issue.

At his death in 1443, the barony was inherited by his daughter Alianore de Morley. She became the wife of Sir William Lovel, who was summoned to parliament as Baron Morley jure uxoris and died in 1476, shortly before her. Their son became Henry Lovel, 8th Baron Morley.

Peerage of England
Preceded by Thomas Morley	Baron Morley; 1435–1442	Succeeded by Alianore Lovel
