= Thomas Morley, 5th Baron Morley =

English soldier and administrator

Thomas Morley
- Baron Morley
- Predecessor: Thomas Morley, 4th Baron Morley
- Successor: Robert Morley, 6th Baron Morley
- Born: about 1394; England
- Died: 6 December 1435
- Buried: Hingham, Norfolk
- Spouse(s): Isabel de la Pole
- Issue: Anne Morley; Robert Morley, 6th Baron Morley; Hugh Morley; Elizabeth Morley
- Father: Robert Morley
- Mother: Isabel (Moleyns?)

Thomas Morley, 5th Baron Morley (1393–1435) was an English landowner, soldier, administrator and politician.

== Origins ==
Born about 1394, he was the son of Robert Morley (died before 1403) and his wife Isabel, said to be the daughter of Sir William Moleyns (died 1381) and his wife Margaret Bacon (died 1399). His paternal grandparents were Thomas Morley, 4th Baron Morley, and his first wife Joan (died 1384).

== Career ==
Inheriting his grandfather's lands and title as Marshal of Ireland in 1416, he joined the English army of King Henry V that was fighting in France and took part in the battles at Rouen in 1418, Melun in 1420 and Meaux in 1421, commanding a force of ten men-at-arms and thirty archers. In that year he was appointed to the Privy Council and was with the king at his death in 1422, being one of the banner bearers at his funeral rites at Paris and then at Westminster. After inheriting the lands of his step-grandmother in 1427, he was summoned to sit as Baron Morley in Parliament for the rest of his life. Returning to the war in France in 1429, he died on 6 December 1435 and was buried at Hingham, Norfolk.

== Family ==
On or before 5 February 1403 he was married to Isabel de la Pole, daughter of Michael de la Pole, 2nd Earl of Suffolk, and his wife Catherine Stafford, daughter of Hugh Stafford, 2nd Earl of Stafford , and his wife Philippa Beauchamp. Their children included:

- Anne Morley (about 1413–1471), who after 21 April 1434 married John Hastings (about 1410 - 1477), constable of Norwich Castle in 1441 and sheriff of Norfolk from 1474 to 1475, and had seven children.
- Robert Morley (1418 – 1443), who succeeded his father as 6th Baron Morley.
- Elizabeth Morley, who was the first wife of Sir John Arundell, of Lanherne in Cornwall, and had one daughter.

His widow died on 8 February 1467 and her will was proved on 27 February 1467. In it she mentions her daughter Anne, married to John Hastings in whose house in Norwich she was living when she made her will on 3 May 1463. Her accounts for that year mention spending three pounds to have her husband's tomb at Hingham painted.

Peerage of England
Preceded by Thomas Morley	Baron Morley; 1416–1435	Succeeded by Robert Morley
