= Julia Fox (author) =

British historian

- Occupations: Author, historian
- Writing career
- Language: English
- Genres: Biography, history
- Website: juliafox.co.uk

Julia Fox is an author and historical researcher, and a former teacher. She lives in London with her husband, the Tudor historian John Guy. Her first book was Jane Boleyn: The Infamous Lady Rochford, a study of the lady-in-waiting at the court of Henry VIII of England and the sister-in-law of Anne Boleyn. Her second book, Sister Queens, is a biography of sisters Katherine of Aragon, who was Henry VIII's first wife, and Joanna of Castile, who was the mother of Charles V, Holy Roman Emperor.

== Works ==
- Jane Boleyn: The Infamous Lady Rochford (Weidenfeld & Nicolson, 2007); published in the U.S. as Jane Boleyn: The True Story of the Infamous Lady Rochford (Ballantine Books, 2007).
- Sister Queens: Katherine of Aragon and Juana, Queen of Castile (Weidenfeld & Nicolson, 2011); published in the U.S. as Sister Queens: The Noble, Tragic Lives of Katherine of Aragon and Juana, Queen of Castile (Ballantine Books, 2011).
- Hunting the Falcon: Henry VIII, Anne Boleyn and the Marriage That Shook Europe (Bloomsbury Publishing, 2023; co-authored with John Guy)
