= Henry Lovel, 8th Baron Morley =

English peer and translator

Henry Lovel (or Lovell), 8th Baron Morley (died 1489) was an English peer and translator, Lord of Morley, Hingham, Hockering, &c., in Norfolk.

He was the son of Alianore Lovel, 7th Baroness Morley, née Morley, (1442–1476) and her husband Sir William Lovel (died 1476), who was Baron Morley in her right.

He married Lady Elizabeth de la Pole (c. 1468 – aft. 1489), daughter of John de la Pole, 2nd Duke of Suffolk and wife Elizabeth Plantagenet, sister of Edward IV and Richard III, but had no children from this marriage. He was succeeded by his sister Alice Parker, 9th Baroness Morley, née Lovel (c. 1467 – 1518).

He died Dixmude in 1489, where he was fighting in support of Maximilian, King of the Romans.
