= Baron Morley =

Title in the Peerage of England (1299–1697)

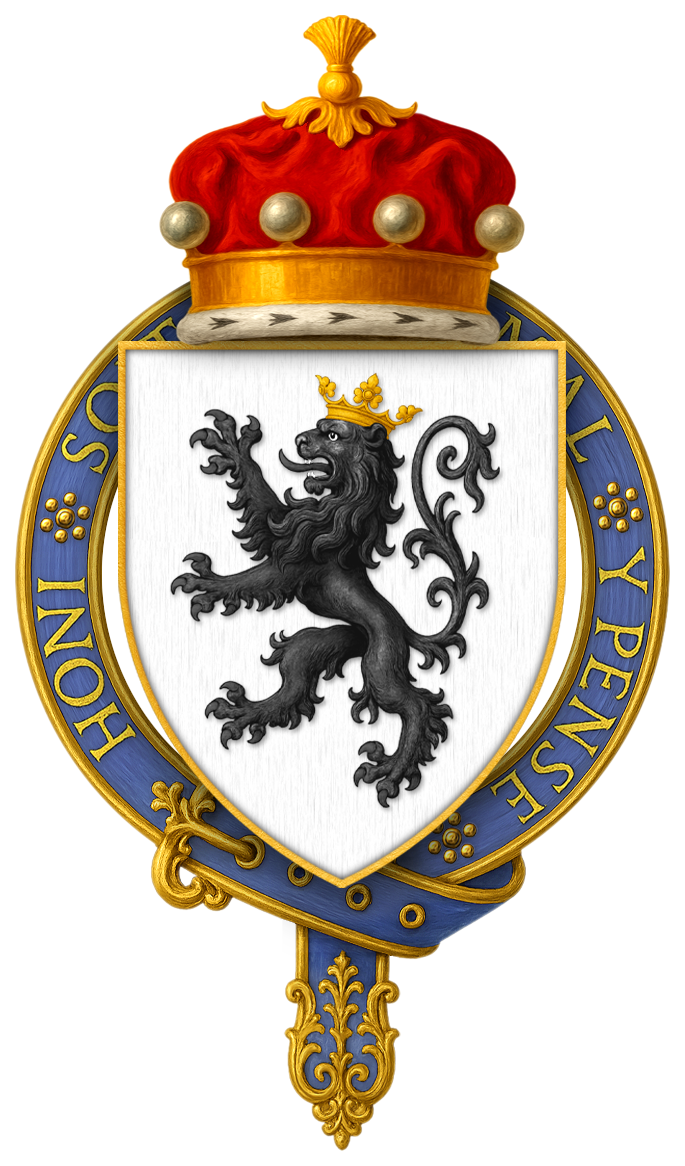
Coat of Arms of Sir Thomas de Morley, 4th Baron Morley

Baron Morley was a title in the peerage of England. On 29 December 1299 William Morley, lord of the manor of Morley Saint Botolph in Norfolk, was summoned to Parliament, regarded as the creation of a hereditary barony. At the death of the sixth baron in 1443, the title was inherited by his daughter Eleanor Morley, the wife of Sir William Lovel, who was summoned to parliament as Baron Morley in right of his wife and died in 1476, shortly before her. It was then inherited by their son Henry Lovel, following whose death in 1489 it came to his sister Alice Lovel, who was married to Henry Parker. The title was then held by her descendants in the Parker family until 1697 when, on the death of the fifteenth baron without children, the title came to an end.

== Unrelated Earldom of Morley (1815) ==
It can be no coincidence that in 1815 John Parker, 2nd Baron Boringdon (1772–1840), of Saltram House in Devon, of the apparently unrelated Parker family which originated from humble origins in North Molton in Devon, on his elevation to the dignity of an earl in 1815, chose the title Earl of Morley, ostensibly referring to his recent purchase of the relatively minor manor of Morley (modern spelling Moreleigh) in Devon, midway between Totnes and Kingsbridge. It had become common in the 19th century for members of the post-mediaeval nobility when elevated further in the peerage to adopt defunct mediaeval titles which bore some ostensible link to the family, thus lending it an air of great antiquity. Such actions were often adopted in all innocence based on erroneous pedigrees produced by genealogists overly eager to please their patrons. An example is the Russell family, Dukes of Bedford, of which a younger son when himself elevated to the peerage adopted the title "Baron Russell of Kingston Russell", an ancient Dorset manor with which his family had in fact no connection.

== Barons Morley (1299) ==
- William Morley, 1st Baron Morley (d. c. 1302)
- Robert Morley, 2nd Baron Morley (died 1360) "having married Hawyse, sister and heir to John le Mareschall, of Hengham, in [the County of Norfolk] had livery of the lands of her inheritance, the 10th of Edward II. Which Hawyse held the office of marshal of Ireland by descent."
- William Morley, 3rd Baron Morley (1319–1379) "the 38th of Edward III. had licence to travel beyond sea, as also to grant his office of mareschall of Ireland (which had descended to him by his mother), to Henry de Ferrers, to hold so long as he behaved himself well therein."
- Thomas Morley, 4th Baron Morley (c. 1354 – 1416)
- Thomas Morley, 5th Baron Morley (c. 1393 – 1435)
- Robert Morley, 6th Baron Morley (1418–1443)
- Alianore Lovel, 7th Baroness Morley née de Morley (1442–1476)
  - Sir William Lovel, 7th Baron Morley (died 1476), Baron Morley in her right.
- Henry Lovel, 8th Baron Morley (1466–1489)
- Alice Parker, 9th Baroness Morley, née Lovel (c. 1467 – 1518)
- Henry Parker, 10th Baron Morley (c. 1486 – 1556)
- Henry Parker, 11th Baron Morley (1531/c. 1532–1577)
- Edward Parker, 12th Baron Morley (c. 1550 – 1618)
- William Parker, 13th Baron Morley (c. 1575 – 1622)
- Henry Parker, 14th Baron Morley (c. 1600 – 1655)
- Thomas Parker, 15th Baron Morley (c. 1636 – 1697) (abeyant 1697)

== Sources ==
- Leigh Rayment's Peerage Pages
- The dormant and extinct baronage of England – Banks – PP356ff
