= Hockering =

Village in Norfolk, England

Coordinates: 52.675°N 1.071°E

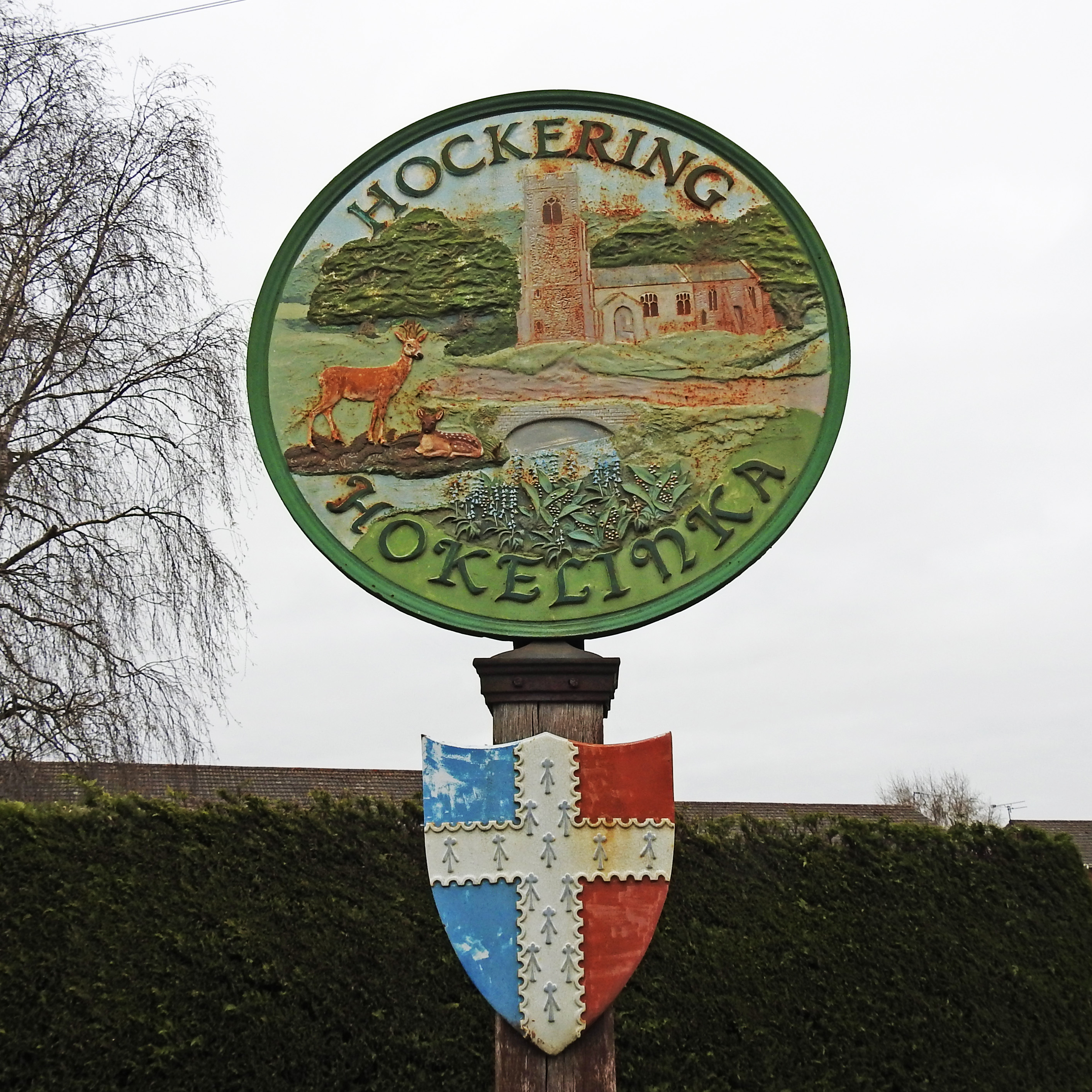
- Hockering Village Sign

- Location within Norfolk
- Area: 3.13 sq mi (8.1 km^{2})
- Population: 829 (2021 census)
  - Density: 265/sq mi (102/km^{2})
- OS grid reference: TG077130
- District: Breckland
- Shire county: Norfolk
- Region: East
- Country: England
- Sovereign state: United Kingdom
- Post town: DEREHAM
- Postcode district: NR20
- Dialling code: 01603
- UK Parliament: Mid Norfolk

Hockering is a village and civil parish in the English county of Norfolk.

Hockering is located 5.2 miles (8.4 km) east of Dereham and 10 miles (16 km) north-west of Norwich, along the A47.

== Correct pronunciation ==
"Hock'ring"

== History ==
Hockering's name is of Anglo-Saxon origin and derives from the Old English for the people of the rounded hill.

In the Domesday Book, Hockering is listed as a settlement of 47 households in the hundred of Mitford. In 1086, the village was part of the East Anglian estates of Ralph de Beaufour.

During the Second World War, Hockering Wood was used as a supply dump for the Royal Air Force. The concrete roads, bomb stores and water tanks still remain.

Furthermore during the war, part of the parish became RAF Attlebridge which was used by No. 2 Group RAF, the 319th Bombardment Group and the 466th Bombardment Group.

== Geography ==
According to the 2021 census, Hockering has a population of 829 people which shows an increase from the 711 people recorded in the 2011 census.

Hockering sits on the A47, between Birmingham and Lowestoft.

== St. Michael's Church ==
Hockering's parish church is dedicated to Saint Michael and dates from the Fifteenth Century. St. Michael's is located within the village on 'The Street' and has been Grade I listed since 1960. The church still holds Sunday service twice a month and is part of the Mattishall & Tudd Valley Benefice.

St. Michael's was restored in the Victorian era and holds an elaborate carved font. The church also holds an elaborate collection of Sixteenth Century plate silver which are held in safety in Norwich.

== Amenities ==
Hockering Church of England Primary School caters to local children and is part of the Eden Federation. The headmistress in Ms. Rebecca Newman.

Hockering Football Club play home games at Heath Road and operate a number of teams. In the 2024/25 Season, the First XI played in Division 2 of the Central & South Norfolk League.

== Notable residents ==
- Lilian Leveridge- (1879–1953) Anglo-Canadian teacher and poet, born in Hockering.

== Governance ==
Hockering is part of the electoral ward of Upper Wensum for local elections and is part of the district of Breckland.

The village's national constituency is Mid Norfolk which has been represented by the Conservative's George Freeman MP since 2010.

== War Memorial ==
Hockering's war memorial is a brass plaque in St. Michael's Church which lists the following names for the First World War:

Rank	Name	Unit	Date of death	Burial/Commemoration
Pte.	John Brown	1st Bn., Bedfordshire Regiment	4 Oct. 1917	Ypres Reservoir Cemetery
Pte.	James C. Hall	3rd Bn., Essex Regiment	6 Sep. 1916	Felixstowe New Cemetery
Pte.	Herbert Frost	47th Bn., Machine Gun Corps	9 Jun. 1918	Pernois British Cemetery
Pte.	Arthur Elliott	8th Bn., Norfolk Regiment	9 Nov. 1917	Dozinghem Cemetery
Pte.	Jack W. Savory	6th Bn., Northamptonshire Regiment	28 Apr. 1918	Abbeville Cemetery
Pte.	Arthur C. Sapey	Queen's Own Royal Regiment	20 Nov. 1917	Fifteen Ravine Cemetery
Pte.	C. Arnold Brand	2nd Bn., Queen's Royal Regiment	16 Apr. 1918	Magnaboschi Cemetery

The following names were added after the Second World War:

Rank	Name	Unit	Date of death	Burial/Commemoration
Sgt.	Harold Curson	No. 207 Squadron RAF (Lancaster)	6 Aug. 1942	St. Mary's Churchyard
Sgt.	Archibald P. Milk MiD	Royal Air Force	22 Dec. 1940	Ma'ala Cemetery
