= Morley St Botolph =

Village in Norfolk, England

Coordinates: 52.55650°N 1.05803°E

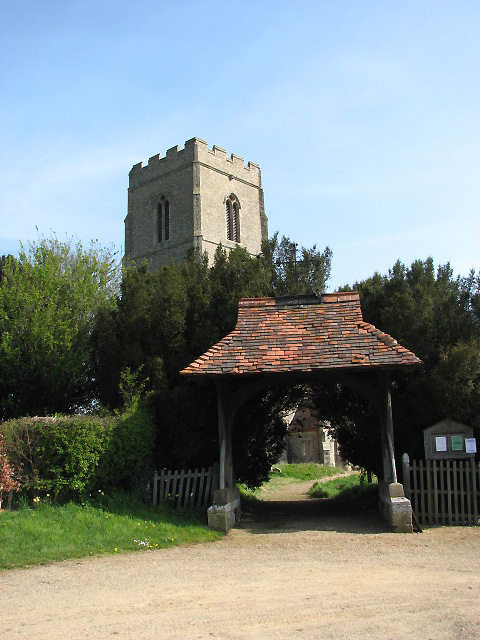
- Lychgate and tower of St Botolph's church

- Location within Norfolk
- OS grid reference: TM074998
- Civil parish: Morley
- District: South Norfolk
- Shire county: Norfolk
- Region: East
- Country: England
- Sovereign state: United Kingdom
- Post town: Wymondham
- Postcode district: NR18
- Dialling code: 01953
- UK Parliament: Mid Norfolk

Morley St Botolph is a village and former civil parish, now in the parish of Morley, in the South Norfolk district, in the county of Norfolk, England. It is situated 4 km south-west of the town of Wymondham and 23 km south-west of the city of Norwich. The village name is normally abbreviated to "Morley St Botolph". In 1931 the parish had a population of 204.

Morley St Botolph has a sister village, Morley Saint Peter, although the two are often simply referred to as "Morley". The names Morley St. Botolph and Morley St. Peter are first attested on the Ordnance Survey map of 1838.

== History ==
The villages name means 'Moor wood/clearing'. 'St. Botolph' after the dedication of the church.

Morley St Botolph played a small part in the early stages of Kett's rebellion of 1549, when the townspeople of Wymondham attacked and broke down enclosures in the village.

On 1 April 1935 the parish was abolished and merged with Morley St Peter to form "Morley".

== Climate ==
Climate data for Morley St Botolph (1991–2020)
Month	Jan	Feb	Mar	Apr	May	Jun	Jul	Aug	Sep	Oct	Nov	Dec	Year
Record high °C (°F)	14.3 (57.7)	17.2 (63.0)	20.9 (69.6)	24.0 (75.2)	26.8 (80.2)	32.6 (90.7)	33.4 (92.1)	35.7 (96.3)	28.8 (83.8)	27.1 (80.8)	17.8 (64.0)	15.3 (59.5)	35.7 (96.3)
Mean daily maximum °C (°F)	7.1 (44.8)	7.7 (45.9)	10.3 (50.5)	13.6 (56.5)	16.7 (62.1)	19.6 (67.3)	22.2 (72.0)	22.4 (72.3)	19.0 (66.2)	14.7 (58.5)	10.3 (50.5)	7.5 (45.5)	14.3 (57.7)
Daily mean °C (°F)	4.4 (39.9)	4.7 (40.5)	6.6 (43.9)	9.1 (48.4)	11.9 (53.4)	14.8 (58.6)	17.2 (63.0)	17.2 (63.0)	14.5 (58.1)	11.1 (52.0)	7.3 (45.1)	4.8 (40.6)	10.3 (50.5)
Mean daily minimum °C (°F)	1.7 (35.1)	1.7 (35.1)	2.9 (37.2)	4.5 (40.1)	7.2 (45.0)	10.0 (50.0)	12.2 (54.0)	12.0 (53.6)	10.0 (50.0)	7.6 (45.7)	4.3 (39.7)	2.0 (35.6)	6.4 (43.5)
Record low °C (°F)	−18.1 (−0.6)	−13.1 (8.4)	−9.0 (15.8)	−5.4 (22.3)	−2.6 (27.3)	0.8 (33.4)	3.3 (37.9)	2.5 (36.5)	−1.1 (30.0)	−4.6 (23.7)	−8.6 (16.5)	−12.8 (9.0)	−18.1 (−0.6)
Average precipitation mm (inches)	54.5 (2.15)	46.8 (1.84)	48.6 (1.91)	39.9 (1.57)	48.5 (1.91)	57.6 (2.27)	60.0 (2.36)	60.1 (2.37)	60.2 (2.37)	66.9 (2.63)	69.5 (2.74)	63.9 (2.52)	676.3 (26.63)
Average precipitation days (≥ 1.0 mm)	11.8	10.5	9.8	9.3	8.4	9.5	9.9	9.6	9.2	11.2	12.6	12.2	123.9
Mean monthly sunshine hours	61.8	81.5	122.8	173.8	210.8	196.4	207.4	188.7	144.9	109.6	67.5	58.0	1,623.3
Source 1: Met Office
Source 2: Starlings Roost Weather
