= Lacock Abbey (monastery) =

Monastery in Wiltshire, England

Coordinates: 51.4146°N 2.1172°W

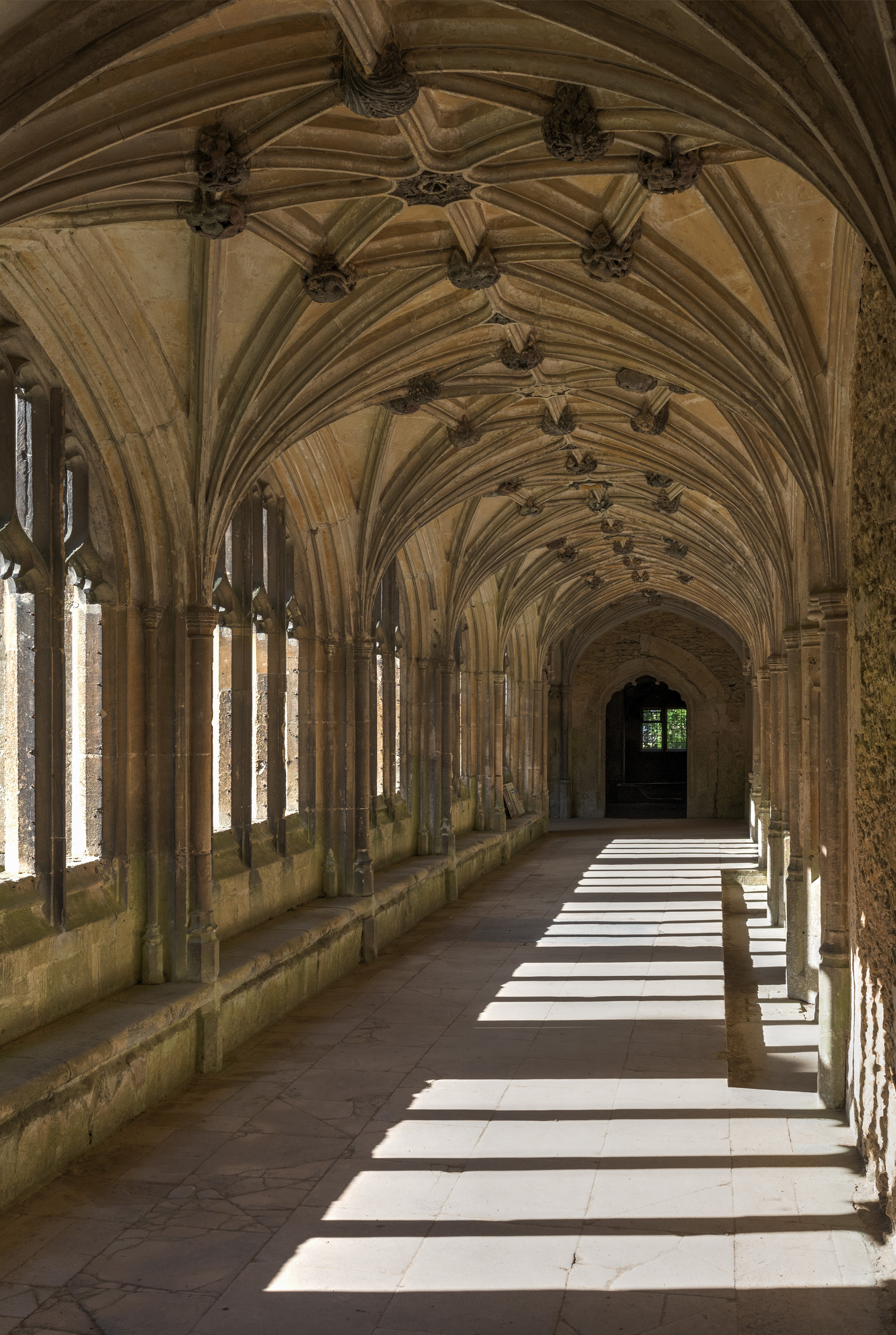
- Lacock Abbey, the cloister
- Interactive map of Lacock Abbey

Monastery information
- Full name: The Abbey Church of the Blessed Mary and St Bernard
- Other name: "locus beate Marie" ("the place of the Blessed Mary")
- Order: Augustinian Canonesses regular
- Established: 1229
- Disestablished: 1539
- Dedication: Virgin Mary
- Diocese: Salisbury

People
- Founder: Ela, 3rd Countess of Salisbury

Site
- Location: Lacock, Wiltshire, England
- Visible remains: most extensive remains of a medieval nunnery in England, but church demolished
- Public access: National Trust

This article relates to the period when Lacock Abbey was an Augustinian nunnery. For the history of the abbey from the Reformation to the present day, see Lacock Abbey.

Lacock Abbey was a monastery founded at Lacock, in the English county of Wiltshire, in the early 13th century by Ela, Countess of Salisbury, as a house of Augustinian canonesses regular. It was seized by the crown in 1539 during the dissolution of the monasteries under Henry VIII. The building then became a country house, Lacock Abbey, notable as the site of Henry Fox Talbot's early experiments in photography.

== Foundation and founder ==
It seems that the monastery's foundation was resolved upon by Ela, Countess of Salisbury in 1226. Ela was the only child and the heir of William FitzPatrick, 2nd Earl of Salisbury, and at his death, when still a child, she became Countess of Salisbury in her own right. At the age of nine she had been married to William Longespée, an illegitimate son of King Henry II.

It was shortly after her husband's death that Countess Ela decided on the foundation. Her eldest son, also William, being a minor, the plan was delayed until he could give his consent. However, in 1229, the foundress made her move by giving her manor of Lacock, together with the moiety of the advowson of the church, to God and the Blessed Mary and St Bernard, toward the building there of an abbey of nuns to be called "locus beate Marie" ("the place of the Blessed Mary"). She had the consent of her son, and the foundation was subsequently confirmed by charters of Henry III, on 31 January 1230 and 26 February following.

Countess Ela laid the abbey's first stone on 16 April 1232 at a site on Snail's Meadow ("Snaylesmede"), lying between the village and the River Avon. The first nuns were veiled that same year, beginning with Alicia Garinges, who was probably previously a nun of the English Augustinian house Goring Priory, Oxfordshire, a house which had been established before 1181. When Burnham Abbey was established in Buckinghamshire in 1265/6 by Richard, Earl of Cornwall, an entire community of nuns was brought from Goring.

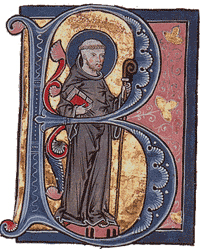
St Bernard, the Abbey's co-patron

From the dedication it is fairly clear that the founder's intention at first had been to found a nunnery that would belong to the Cistercian Order. However, this was preempted by a decision of the 1228 Cistercian general chapter to confirm its opposition to accepting responsibility for any more convents of women. Moreover, when Robert Bingham, Bishop of Salisbury gave his formal approval to the foundation on 20 April 1230, he enjoined upon the nuns the following of the Rule of St Augustine. This made of the house one of the relatively few Augustinian nunneries in England.

It is most likely that Ela intended from the first to become abbess of her own foundation, a sign of this being the fact that the house was ruled in the initial period by a prioress, Wymarca. Advised apparently by Saint Edmund Rich, Archbishop of Canterbury, she took the habit as a nun in late 1237 or early 1238 and was elected at the latest by the feast of the Assumption (15 August) of 1239, receiving the bishop's blessing as abbess for some reason at Sherston. She remained abbess until 31 December 1257, when she resigned in favour of Beatrice of Kent. She died on the feast of St Bartholomew, 24 August 1261, and was buried in the choir of the abbey church.

To the initial endowment of the manor and village of Lacock, were added eventually by Ela and her son, among other properties, the manors of Hatherop, Bishopstrow, Chitterne, Upham in Aldbourne and Woodmancote.

== Development ==
Throughout the thirteenth century Lady Ela's descendants remained close to the abbey, both in bestowing material support and by choosing it as a preferred burial place. Of Ela's eight or nine children, two sons ‒ Richard, a canon of Salisbury and Stephen, Justiciar of Ireland ‒ were buried in the abbey church, as was the heart of a third son, Nicholas, Bishop of Salisbury. Ela's granddaughter Margaret, Countess of Lincoln, took a close interest in the abbey and in 1309 was buried in the abbey church. Other granddaughters, the sisters Katherine and Lorica FitzWalter, became nuns at Lacock.

The building of the Abbey presumably took some time, since Henry III contributed four oaks from the forest of Chippenham in 1246 and a further 15 from the royal forests in 1264. In 1247 he donated 50 marks, while in 1285 Edward I gave 10 oaks from Melksham Forest.

In 1242 Henry III granted a fair at Lacock on the vigil, the feast, and the morrow of the Translation of St Thomas of Canterbury (7 July) and a Tuesday market, in 1257 at Chitterne a fair on the vigil and feast of St Peter and St Paul (29 June) and the six days following and a Monday market, and in 1260 a Friday market at Lacock. Along with various wood-gathering rights, the Abbey also received in 1260 from the king 40 acres of Melksham Forest. Various members of the nobility similarly made various grants of lands and of rents in the latter part of the century, even after Ela's death, though no important land was acquired after 1300. Other privileges were countered by obligations and exactions in the mesh of feudal obligations, though the nuns sometimes managed to contest these at law or to obtain remittance or exemption from the crown.

Developments in the 14th century included a lady-chapel, a separate lodging for the abbess, and major alterations to the dorter and frater, with work on remodelling the cloister continuing into the next century. Already in the time of the second abbess, Beatrice of Kent, a water conduit was constructed bringing supplies from Bowden Hill, along with a corn mill within the Abbey close.

As elsewhere, the early presence of noblewomen among the nuns soon gave way to the daughters of modestly prosperous landowners and burgesses. In a note of the expenses for the clothing in 1395–1396 of Joan, the daughter of Nicholas Samborne, her habit consisted of a tunic of white woollen cloth, a mantle lined with white cloth for summer and another lined with fur for winter, a fur pilch (a type of leather cloak with the fur on the inside), a veil, and wimple. She had also trousseau that included a bed with mattress, blankets, coverlet, and tester, a silver spoon and a mazer-bowl (a wide, shallow bowl). As was often the case with medieval English nunneries, the house was not always in good financial health and in 1403 it was given exemption from royal taxation for reason of poverty. It was given 40 years' exemption in 1447 after the bell-tower and bells, the bakehouse, the brewery, and two barns full of corn at Lacock had been set afire by lightning and destroyed, as had the grange buildings at Chitterne.

Little is known with any continuity of the abbey's accounts, but some details are known of the abbey's farming and other income. As the centuries passed, there seems to have been a general tendency to let out the lands rather than exploiting them directly; this practice included a coal-mine at Hanham in Gloucestershire which the abbey owned and leased out. Apart from consumption of meat of animals for their own nutrition, in 1476 the abbey was engaged in sheep-rearing on a commercial scale to the extent of having a flock of over 2,000 sheep, most of them on the manor of Chitterne. The inventory drawn up at Chitterne at the Dissolution records 600 wethers, 600 ewes, and 300 hogs; at the same period, among their employees were 15 hinds and a swanherd. Moreover, while the indications that can be gleaned from the uneven surviving data are insufficient for a fuller picture, in August 1535, the commissioner John Ap Rice reported that "the house is very clene, well prepared and well ordered" and in 1536 the commissioners noted that the church, house and the buildings in general were "in very good astate", and they added: "Owing by the house nil, and to the house nil".

== Spiritual health ==
There exist no surviving records of the outcome of bishops’ visitations, though these are known to have taken place, at least in the 14th and 15th centuries. It would appear that these were not always occasions when the nuns wanted to convince the bishop of the austerity of their life, since the cellaress's roll for Wednesday 30 August 1347 records the purchase of salmon, lobsters, crabs and lampreys for the visitation by Bishop Robert Wyvil of Salisbury.

The abbey contracted various obligations of praying for dead benefactors and of giving alms for that purpose. An early benefactor, Sir John Bluet, claimed burial in a Lady chapel to be constructed for the purpose; but it was also agreed that there would be a chantry to pray for the souls of him and his wife, and that on his anniversary a halfpenny would be given to each of a thousand poor.

The nuns seem never to have reached high numbers. In 1395 there were 22; in 1445, 17 nuns with the right to vote; in 1473 only 14 nuns, while at the Dissolution there were a total of 17 members of the community, including three novices. The latter fact suggests that the house was still attractive enough to be recruiting. Indeed, the broader condition of the house, even on a moral plane, appears to have been healthy and the surviving records over the whole period report no serious scandal.

== Abbesses of Lacock ==
The list that follows may be incomplete. The dates indicate mentions in the records, not definite extremes of the term of office.

- Wymarca (prioress)
- Ela (first abbess) (1239–1257)
- Beatrice of Kent (1257–1269?)
- Alice (1282, 1286)
- Juliana (1288, 1290)
- Agnes (1299)
- Joan de Montfort (1303?–1332)
- Katherine le Cras (1332–1334)
- Sybil de Sainte Croix (1334–1349)
- Maud de Montfort (1349–1356)
- Agnes de Brymesden (1356–1361)
- Faith Selyman (1361–?1380)
- Agnes de Wyke (1380–?)
- Ellen de Montfort (1405–?)
- Agnes Frary or Fray (1429–1445)
- Agnes Draper (1445–1473)
- Margery Glowceteror or Gloucestrie (1473–?)
- Joan Temse or Temmse, Temys (1516?–1539)

== Books ==
While not all medieval English nuns could read, or read fluently, some took part in literary culture – especially those who were women of social rank. The books in the house would often include at least a small library with biblical texts, lives of the Saints and other spiritual works, and perhaps some books on practical subjects, bearing in mind that the management of the abbey would have been a considerable challenge. Furthermore, the celebration of the liturgy for a large part of the day and night would necessitate texts for the participants; for celebrations of the sacraments, the nuns would rely on one or more chaplains who would also need liturgical books.

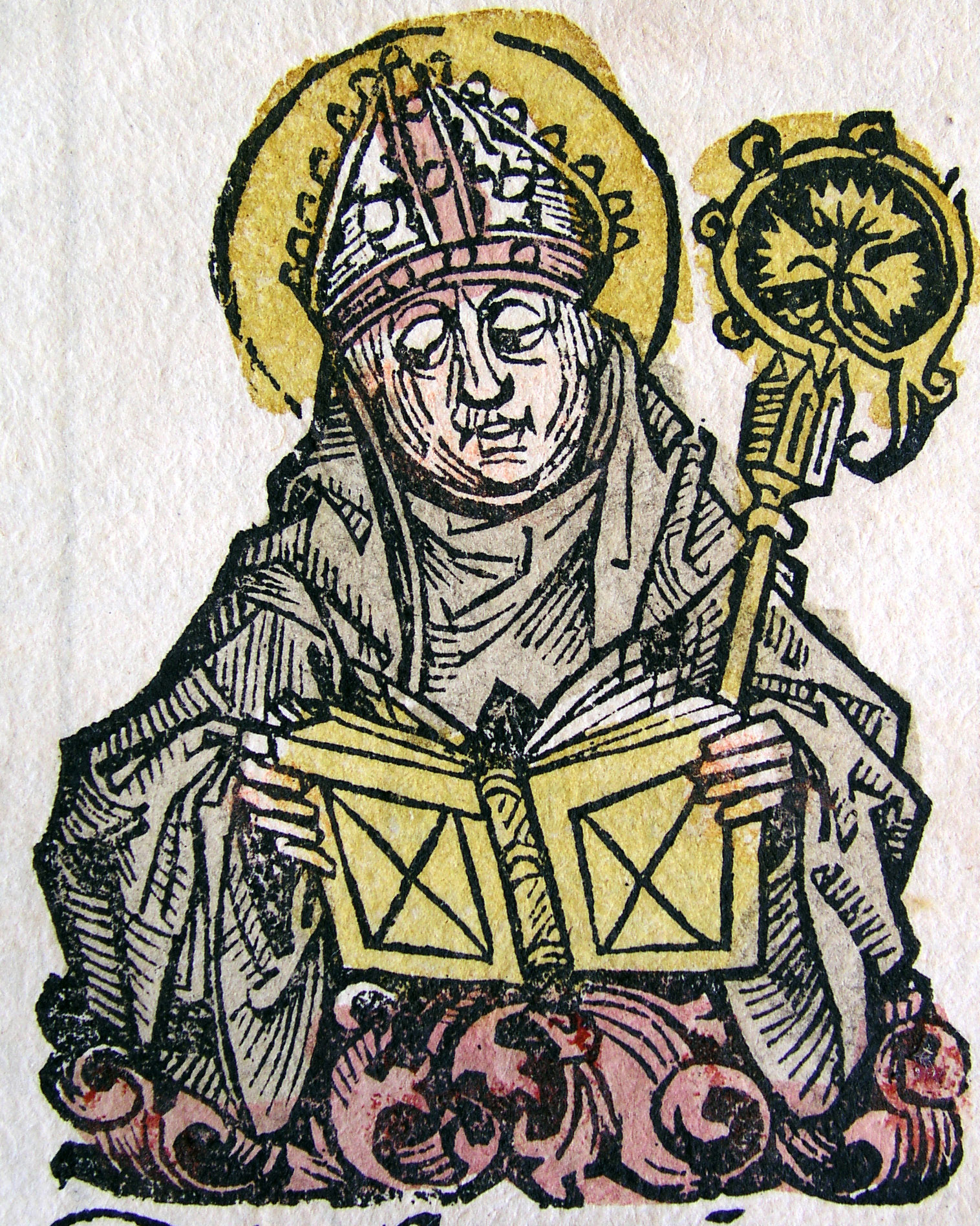
St Edmund of Abingdon

It is possible that the treatise, Speculum Ecclesiae, was originally written by Saint Edmund Rich (died 1240) in Anglo-French under the title of Miroir de Sainte Eglise for Ela and her community, though none of the surviving manuscripts seem traceable to the abbey. Current scholarship has identified only three books as having belonged physically to Lacock Abbey, as follows.

In 1399 Bishop Ralph Erghum of Salisbury left the Abbess of Lacock "my beautiful psalter which the Rector of Marnhull gave me". This may be the psalter now in the Bodleian Library (MS Laud. Lat. 114 (649).

In 2011 two books originally at the abbey, and still there apparently within living memory, went under the hammer at Christie's. One was a decorated vellum manuscript copy of the work of a 12th-century English clergyman, William Brito, Expositiones Vocabulorum Biblie, was purchased by the National Trust and is now kept at Lacock. The volume shows signs of having been chained, and has incorporated into the binding 13th-century financial accounts of the abbey.

The other book sold at the time was said to be a collection of treatises in Anglo-Norman verse, opening with Walter of Bibbesworth's Le tretiz. This too is a decorated manuscript on vellum and dates probably to the first half of the 14th century. In its binding are leaves from a manuscript, dateable to about 1300, containing theological notes that refer to the writings of St Thomas Aquinas; this has led some to think they might be the work of William of Cirencester, a Dominican friar whom Bishop Simon of Ghent of Salisbury appointed penitentiary (confessor) at Lacock Abbey in 1303.

In a different category are the manuscript cartularies of Lacock Abbey which were acquired by the British Library in 2011, and are conserved in two volumes in medieval binding, now classed as Additional MS 88973 and Additional MS 88974. They are viewable in digitised copy on the library's website.

== The seal ==
There are a number of surviving impressions of the Abbey's seal dating from the period from the 13th and 16th centuries. Its shape is a pointed oval showing the Virgin Mary wearing a crown and seated on a carved throne with the Child Jesus on her left knee. Above is a panelled and pinnacled canopy surmounted by a cross, and below a trefoiled arch above an unidentified kneeling figure with hands raised in prayer. The inscription is “S' CONVENT BEATE MARIE SANCTI B'NARDI DE LACOC”.

The motif as regards the Virgin Mary is known as the Seat of Wisdom (Sedes sapientiae), which was a common motif for seals of nunneries in medieval England, though not the majority choice. The motif usually depicts of the Blessed Virgin seated and facing forward, presenting or holding the Christ Child on her lap, often seated.

Doubtless it was the practive at Lacock as elsewhere for some at least of the heads of house to have a personal seal. Impressions have survived of that of the Lady Ela as abbess. It, too, is a pointed oval, showing the Virgin Mary and Child Jesus under a canopy. What can be read of the inscription is “... GILL ELE ABB … TISSE DE LA ...” (i.e. Sigill(um) Ele abbatisse de Lacoc” – “Seal of Ela, abbess of Lacock”).

The seal of the Priory at some periods at least seems to have depicted the Coronation of the Virgin Mary, which is not a particularly common motif in medieval English nunneries.

== Seizure ==
According to the 1536 Commissioners the abbey was for the town “and all other adioynynge by common reaporte a greate Releef”, and the nuns were “by Reporte and in apparaunce of vertuous lyvyng, all desyrynge to contynue religios”. However, the ultimate game of the crown was not an inspection of the spiritual health of the monastic houses, but to spy out and bleed their material resources. The abbey, whose gross income was assessed in 1534 at about £203, was on the bordline of the criterion for suppression, which stood at £200 and below. On 30 January 1537, for the outlay of a £300 “fine” it was granted a licence to continue. The exactions continued, however, and before two years had passed, the end came.

It was on 21 January 1539 that the abbey was surrendered to William Petre, and John Tregonwell, who with John Smyth in those months visited over 40 houses on behalf of the government on an identical mission. At Lacock nuns of the community were dispersed with a pension, the highest sum being for the abbess, who received £40, the prioress, Elizabeth Monmorthe, £5, then down the scale to the novices, who received £2 each. By the year's end two of the nuns had died, and fourteen years later the recipients were only seven, including the former abbess.

== Later history ==
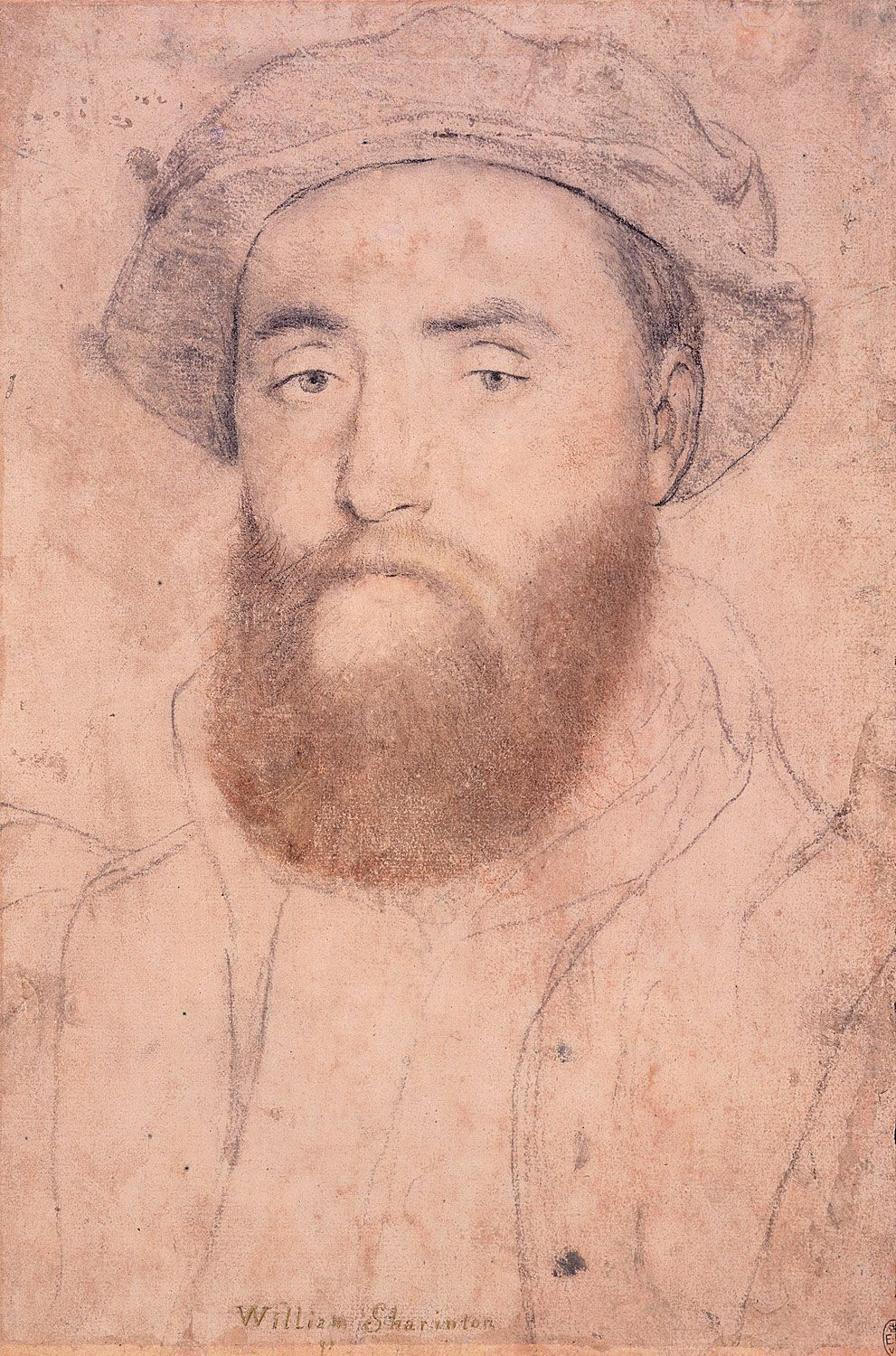
William Sharington by Hans Holbein the Younger

As was the habitual procedure, the abbey's buildings were stripped of lead, which at Lacock realized £193, before being released to the prospective purchaser, William Sharington, later Sir William Sharington (c.1495–1553), a courtier, politician and entrepreneur, who farmed the site of the abbey together with the manor and rectory of Lacock along with other local monastic properties until the purchase was completed in the summer of 1540. He paid the crown £783 for the Abbey. He demolished the church and adapted the remaining buildings as a dwelling. From the sale of the church bells he raised money to rebuild Ray bridge so that the public road would not lead to what was now his residence.

Having been made head of the royal mint at Bristol, Sharington perverted the minting process for his own enrichment then diverted funds to a conspiracy aiming at a coup d’état in the reign of Edward VI. Though caught and accused of treason, Sharington escaped through his connections, including the reformer Hugh Latimer, who lauded him in a sermon preached before the boy king during Lent of 1549, calling him "an honest gentleman, and one that God loveth... a chosen man of God, and one of his elected". In November 1549 Sharington secured a pardon and for a massive fine of £12,867 recovered his estates, including the Lacock Abbey property. Thereafter ownership of the latter was transmitted by inheritance not sale until 1944, when it passed to the National Trust.

== See also ==
- Catholic Church in England
- List of monasteries dissolved by Henry VIII of England
