= Ela Longespée =

- Countess of Warwick
- Coat of arms of Longespée
- Died: 9 February 1298; Godstow Abbey
- Noble family: Longespée
- Spouses: Thomas de Beaumont, 6th Earl of Warwick (died 1242); Philip Basset (died 1271)
- Father: William Longespée, earl of Salisbury (died 1226)
- Mother: Ela Longespée, suo jure countess of Salisbury

Ela Longespée, Countess of Warwick (died 9 February 1298) was an English noblewoman. She was the daughter of Ela of Salisbury, 3rd Countess of Salisbury and William Longespée, and sister to, among others, Nicholas Longespee, Bishop of Salisbury. Ela married, first, Thomas de Beaumont, 6th Earl of Warwick, and, secondly, Philip Basset. She was a great religious benefactor, and contributed to the foundation of Merton College, Oxford.

== Early life and first marriage ==
Ela was probably born sometime around 1210, and married the 24-year-old Thomas of Warwick, son of Earl Henry of Warwick, in the summer of 1229, before his father's death. Thomas succeeded his father soon afterwards, bringing to his depleted earldom Ela's substantial marriage portion, the manor of Chitterne in Wiltshire. The marriage depleted the earldom further: to attract it the Warwicks contributed a dower of five of their demesne manors, including the manor of Tanworth-in-Arden and the forest of Sutton in Warwickshire. Earl Thomas died childless on 27 June 1242, leaving Ela a wealthy widow.

== First widowhood and second marriage ==
Ela was involved in her mother's foundation of Lacock Abbey in 1249, donating her manor of Hatherop in Gloucestershire. She settled mainly in Oxfordshire where she had the large manor of Hook Norton as part of her dower. As early as 1248 she had entered into a relationship with Philip Basset, a leading justice and lord of the barony of High Wycombe who that year was involved in her business interests in Warwickshire. They married in or around 1254, after Philip obtained a papal dispensation because the pair were related in the third degree. It was seemingly a prosperous marriage, and Ela was involved with several of her husband's property transactions, before his death in 1271. Together they patronised the friars, and gave money and support to Walter de Merton's new college. She had no issue by this second marriage.

== Second widowhood ==
After the death of Philip Basset in 1271, Ela was without a protector, and exposed to the aggression of William de Beauchamp, the new earl of Warwick. She possessed a substantial share of the assets of the earldom which would revert to him at her death. Between 1275 and 1278 Earl William waged an expensive fight through the courts to dislodge her from them. Eventually in 1289 she surrendered to him the manors of Claverdon and Tanworth-in-Arden, though it is not known whether it was for a financial inducement. Despite this and other lawsuits, she still had the resources to give money and lands to many religious houses, which are recorded in the remarkable roll listing her benefactions and the spiritual rewards she expected from them. Among them were gifts to Oseney Abbey, St Frideswide's, Bicester Priory, Thame Abbey, Rewley Abbey, Studley Priory (Oxfordshire), Lacock Abbey and Godstow Abbey. Her charters record other grants in return for masses: to Reading Abbey and Selborne Priory. In 1293, she founded the University of Oxford's Warwick chest—substantial bursaries for poor scholars—and gave money towards the chapel of Balliol College.

Ela retired in the 1290s to Godstow, dying a year after her brother Nicholas, in 1298. Her body was buried at Oseney and her entrails at Rewley. Her heart may have been buried elsewhere. She kept her Longespée name, and her seals all display her own coat of arms prominently, as well as carrying those of her husbands.

== Bibliography ==
- Amt, Emilie (2009). "Ela Longespee's roll of benefits: Piety and reciprocity in the thirteenth century". Traditio. 64: 1–56. doi:10.1017/S0362152900002245. JSTOR 27832088.
- Pollock, M.A. (2015). Scotland, England and France after the Loss of Normandy, 1204-1296: 'Auld Amitie'. The Boydell Press.
- The Newburgh Earldom of Warwick and its Charters, 1088-1253 ed. David Crouch and Richard Dace (Dugdale Society, 48, 2015).
