= William Longsword (disambiguation) =

William Longsword (c. 893–942) was the second ruler of Normandy, from 927 until his assassination in 942.

William Longsword may also refer to:

- William II of England or William Longsword (c. 1056–1100)
- William Longsword, a crusader who led English troops at the Siege of Lisbon (1147)
- William FitzEmpress (1136-1164), who subscribed a charter as 'Willelmi Longespe'
- William of Montferrat, Count of Jaffa and Ascalon (c. 1140–1177), crusader
- William of Winchester, Lord of Lüneburg (1184–1213), son of Henry the Lion
- William Longespée, 3rd Earl of Salisbury (1167–1226), illegitimate son of Henry II of England
- William II Longespée (1212–1250), crusader
