= Ela Longespee =

Norman Irish Noble women

Ela Longespee, Lady of Ashby (1244 – c. 19 July 1276) was a wealthy heiress and daughter of Stephen Longespée, Justiciar of Ireland, and Emmeline de Riddlesford, granddaughter of Walter de Riddlesford. She was the wife of Sir Roger La Zouche, Lord of Ashby.

== Family ==
Ela was born in 1244 at Salisbury, Wiltshire and was the eldest daughter and co-heiress of Stephen Longespée, Justiciar of Ireland, Seneschal of Gascony, and son of William Longespee, the illegitimate son of Henry II. Her paternal grandmother was Ela, Countess of Salisbury, who had founded Lacock Abbey, and after whom she was named. Her maternal grandmother was the daughter of Henry FitzRoy (d. 1158). Ela had a younger sister, Emmeline, who became the second wife of Maurice FitzGerald, 3rd Lord of Offaly in 1273.

== Marriage and issue ==
In about 1266 in Northamptonshire, she married Sir Roger La Zouche, Lord of Ashby, the son of Sir Alan La Zouche and Helen de Quincy. Their marriage produced one son:

- Alan la Zouche, 1st Baron la Zouche of Ashby (19 October 1267 – 25 March 1314), married Eleanor de Segrave, by whom he had three daughters.

Ela died on about 19 July 1276 at the age of 32. Her younger sister Emmeline, was co-heiress to their father and the wife of Maurice fitz Maurice. She had one daughter, Juliana, who married Thomas de Clare, lord of Thomond. Emeline battled her daughter, Juliana, and her step-daughter Amabilia (Maurice's daughter from a previous marriage) for many years for her dower. Juliana had been granted in frank-marriage to Thomas de Clare, and Maurice had given the Barony of Inchiquin and the town of Youghal, both in County Cork, to the newlywed couple. Amabilia and John fitz Thomas (later the first Earl of Kildare) spent many years trying to recover the marriage lands from Juliana and dower lands from Emmeline.
