= History of Lacock =

Coordinates: 51.415°N 2.117°W

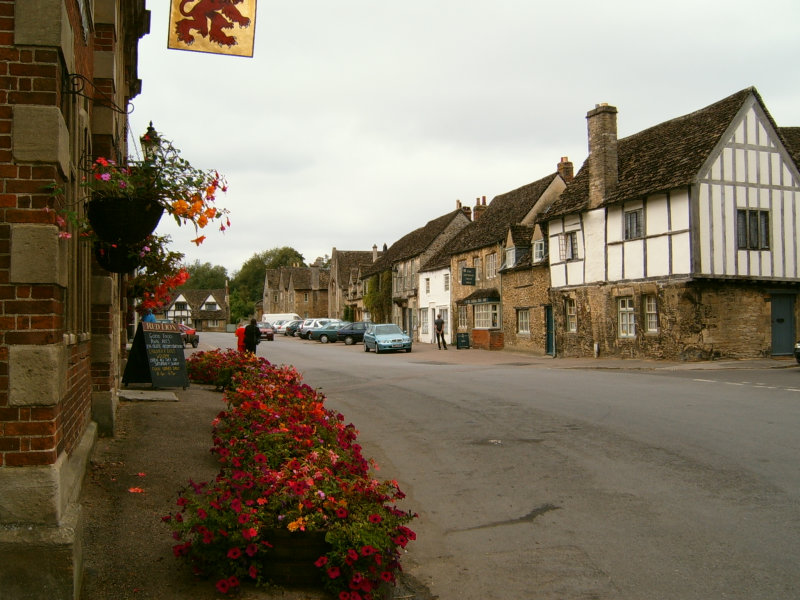
Lacock High Street

Lacock, England was first mentioned in the Domesday Book in 1086 with a population of less than 200, two small mills and a vineyard. The village's main attraction, Lacock Abbey, was founded on the manorial lands by Ela, Countess of Salisbury and established in 1232; in the reign of Henry III. Lacock was granted a market and developed a thriving wool industry during the Middle Ages. Reybridge, and a packhorse ford, remained the only crossing points of the River Avon until the 17th century.

== Middle Ages ==
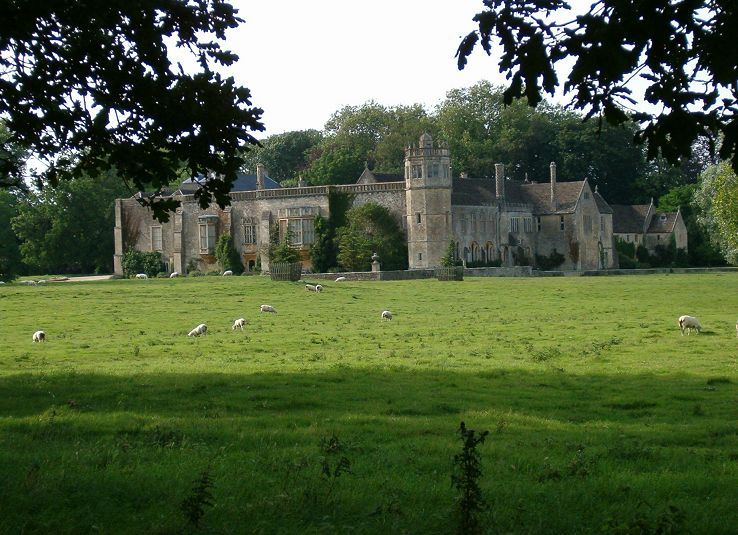
Lacock Abbey from the south-east

Following the Dissolution of the Monasteries in the mid-16th century, Henry VIII sold the abbey to Sir William Sharington, who converted it into a house starting in 1539, demolishing the abbey church. Few other alterations were made to the monastic buildings themselves: the cloisters, for example, still stand below the living accommodation and can be seen today. About 1550, Sir William added an octagonal tower containing two small chambers, one above the other; the lower one was reached through the main rooms, and was for storing and viewing his treasures; the upper one, for banqueting, is only accessible by a walk across the leads of the roof. In each is a central octagonal stone table carved with up-to-date Renaissance ornament. A mid-16th-century stone conduit house stands over the spring from which water was conducted to the house. Further additions were made over the centuries, and the house now has various grand reception rooms.

== 16th and 17th centuries ==
In the 16th and early 17th centuries, Nicholas Cooper has pointed out, bedchambers were often named for individuals who customarily inhabited them when staying at a house. At Lacock, as elsewhere, they were named for individuals "whose recognition in this way advertised the family's affinities": the best chamber was "the duke's chamber", probably signifying John Dudley, 1st Duke of Northumberland, whom Sharington had served, while "Lady Thynne's chamber", identified it with the wife of Sir John Thynne of Longleat, and "Mr Mildmay's chamber" was reserved for Sharington's son-in-law Anthony Mildmay of Apethorpe in Northamptonshire.

== 18th and 19th centuries ==
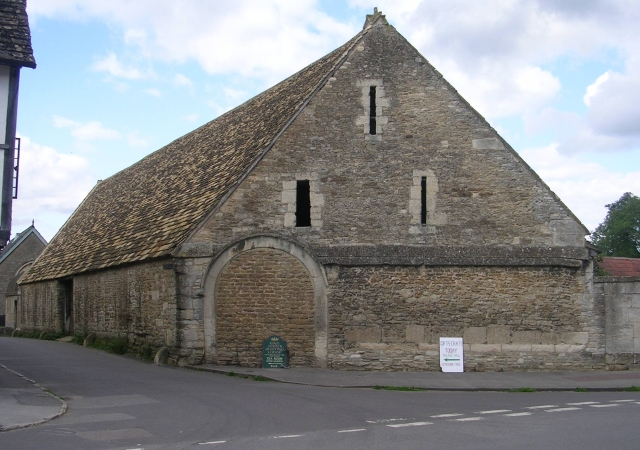
Tithe barn

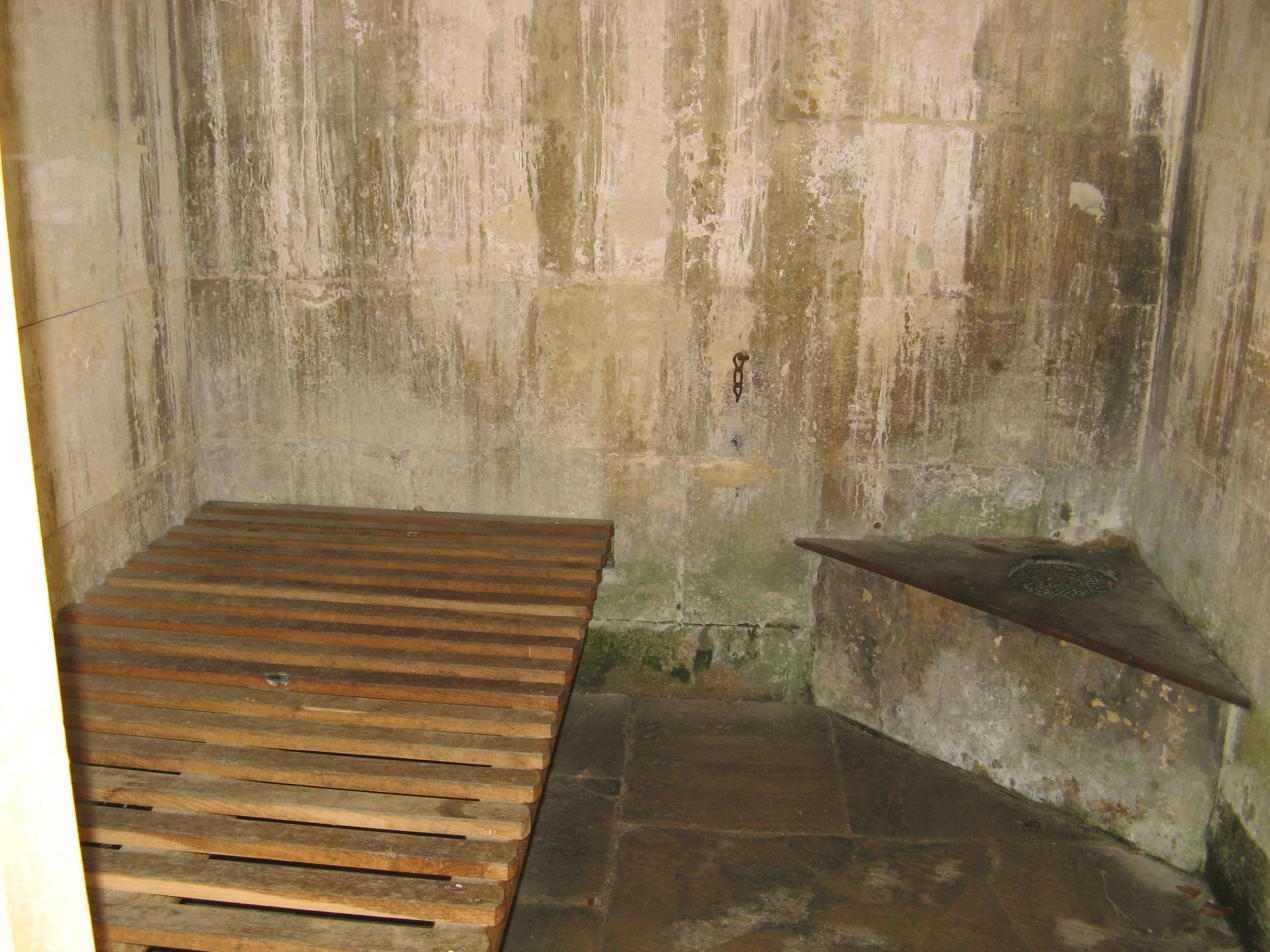
Interior of village lock-up

Most of the surviving houses in the village are 18th-century or earlier in construction, and people still live there today. There is a 14th-century tithe barn, a medieval church, an inn dating from the 15th century, an 18th-century lock-up and a village school which is still used today.

Lacock Abbey was later passed on to the Talbot family who built a full upstairs extension and turned it into an early-19th-century-style manor, while leaving the original cloisters and many of the abbey rooms intact.

== 20th and 21st centuries ==
In 1916 the late Henry Fox Talbot's son Charles bequeathed the Lacock estate to his niece, Matilda Gilchrist-Clark, who took the name of Talbot. During World War II many evacuees came to Lacock and lived on the estate till the latter stages of the war. The estate – comprising 284 acres (1.15 km^{2}), the Abbey and the village – was given to the National Trust in 1944 by Matilda Talbot.

In 1932, to celebrate the 700th anniversary of the foundation of the abbey, a pageant was held on Saturday 3 September when villagers dressed up in medieval style clothes and held a medieval fayre.

Lacock has been admired by many, including the playwright George Bernard Shaw who was a regular visitor in his later years, mainly for his hobby of photography; there is a section about him in the Lacock museum.

In recent times, Lacock has appeared in several films for its historic and unspoilt appearance, and the abbey in particular appeared in several of the Harry Potter films.
