= Goring Priory =

Monastery in Oxfordshire, England

Goring Priory was a medieval monastery of Augustinian Canonesses regular in Oxfordshire, England, established before 1181.

When Burnham Abbey was established in 1265/6 by Richard, Earl of Cornwall, an entire community of nuns was sent from Goring.

Moreover, Lacock Abbey was founded in Wiltshire in the early 13th century by Ela, Countess of Salisbury and the initial group of nuns took the veil in 1232, the very first of the nuns was Alicia Garinges, who was probably previously a nun of Goring.

The seal of Goring Priory depicted the Virgin Mary in the pose of the Seat of Wisdom (Sedes sapientiae), which was a common motif for seals of nunneries in medieval England, though not the majority choice. The motif entails a depiction of the Blessed Virgin seated and facing forward, presenting or holding the Christ Child on her lap.

== See also ==
House of Austin nuns: The priory of Goring, in William Page (ed.), A History of the County of Oxford, vol. 2, London, 1907, pp. 103–104. British History Online http://www.british-history.ac.uk/vch/oxon/vol2/pp103-104 [accessed 21 October 2017].
