= William de Bosco =

English mediaeval churchman

William de Bosco (also de Boys) was an English medieval churchman, college fellow, and university chancellor.

William de Bosco was one of the early Fellows of Merton College, Oxford, from 1284 to 1286. He was a doctor of theology and Chancellor of the University of Oxford. Later he became a Canon at Salisbury through Simon of Ghent, Bishop of Salisbury and also a Chancellor of Oxford University.

Academic offices
Preceded by Thomas Bek	Chancellor of the University of Oxford; 1273–1276	Succeeded by Eustace de Normanville
Preceded by Walter Burdun	Chancellor of the University of Oxford; 1308–1309	Succeeded by Henry de Maunsfeld
