= Walter Burdun =

English medieval churchman

Walter Burdun (also Burdi, de Burton, de Bordon, or de Bourton) was an English medieval churchman, college fellow, and university chancellor.

From 1306 to 1308, Burdun was Chancellor of the University of Oxford. He was a Fellow of Merton College, Oxford between 1312 and 1328. where he served as bursar. He was a prebend at Salisbury through Simon of Ghent, Bishop of Salisbury and also a Chancellor of Oxford University.

Academic offices
Preceded by Simon de Faversham	Chancellor of the University of Oxford; 1306–1308	Succeeded by William de Bosco
