= Walter Giffard (Oxford) =

English theologist and university chancellor

Walter Giffard (also Gifford) was an English medieval theologist, university vice-chancellor, and university chancellor.

In 1311, Giffard was Vice-Chancellor and Chancellor of the University of Oxford.

== Bibliography ==
- Hibbert, Christopher, ed. (1988). The Encyclopaedia of Oxford. Macmillan. ISBN 0-333-39917-X.

Academic offices
Preceded by ?	Vice-Chancellor of the University of Oxford; 1311	Succeeded by ?
Preceded by Henry de Maunsfeld	Chancellor of the University of Oxford; 1311	Succeeded by Henry de Maunsfeld
