= Battle of Damme =

Medieval naval battle during the 1202–1214 Anglo-French War

- Part of the Anglo-French War (1213–14)
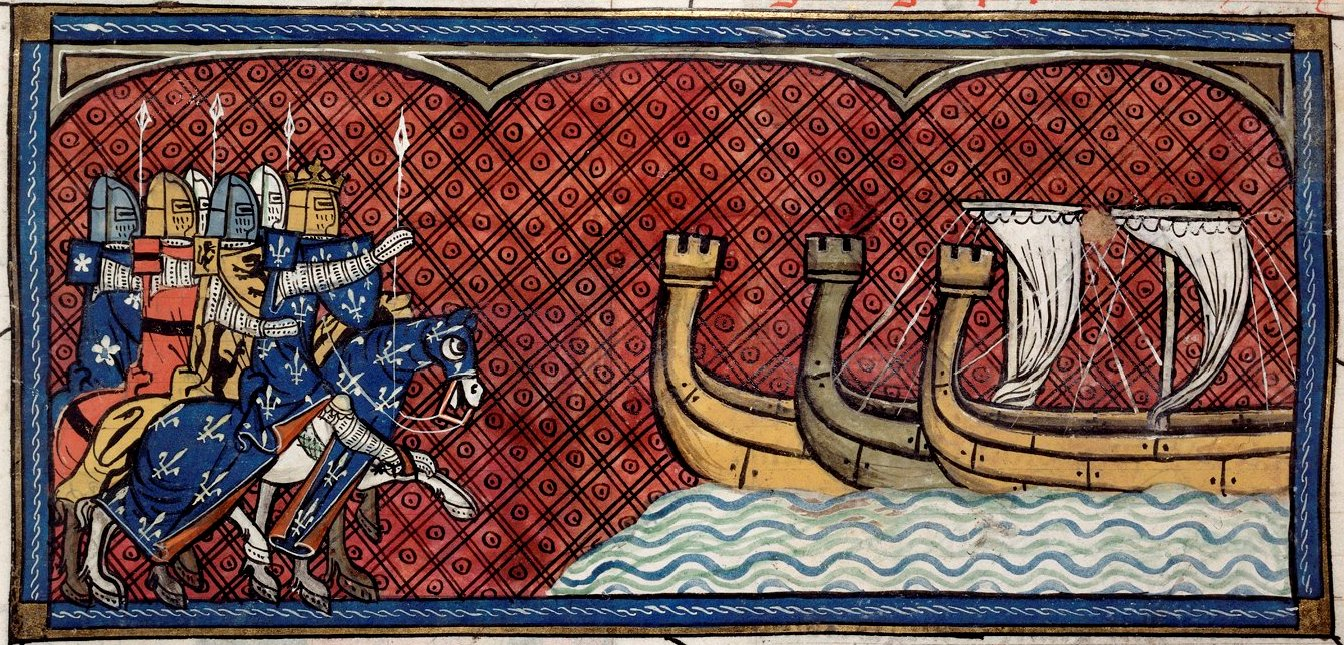
- Philip II awaits his fleet
Date	30–31 May 1213
Location	Damme, County of Flanders 51°15′N 03°16′E
Result	English victory

Belligerents
Kingdom of France	Kingdom of England; County of Flanders

Commanders and leaders
Savari de Mauléon	William Longespée, 3rd Earl of Salisbury

Strength
Unknown, but large	Unknown

Casualties and losses
300 ships captured, over 100 burned; remaining ships scuttled.	Unknown

The Battle of Damme was fought on 30 and 31 May 1213 during the 1213–1214 Anglo-French War. An English fleet led by William Longespée, Earl of Salisbury accidentally encountered a large French fleet under the command of Savari de Mauléon in the vicinity of the port of Damme, in Flanders. The French crews were mostly ashore, pillaging the countryside, and the English captured 300 French ships at anchor, and looted and fired a further hundred beached ships. The main French army, commanded by King Philip II of France, was nearby besieging Ghent and it promptly marched on Damme. It arrived in time to relieve the town's French garrison and drive off the English landing parties. Philip had the remainder of the French fleet burned to avoid capture. The success of the English raid yielded immense booty and ended the immediate threat of a French invasion of England. It is often considered the first great naval victory in English history.

== Background ==
When King John of England (r. 1199–1216) came to the throne he attempted to expand his territory, launching a campaign in Normandy in 1200. He was defeated by King Philip II of France (r. 1180–1223) and had lost most of his overseas possessions by 1204. Subsequently, John repeatedly attempted to form alliances against Philip, with a view to recovering Normandy. In 1208 John's nephew, Otto, became Holy Roman Emperor. Prior to his accession Otto had promised to help John recover his lost possessions. By 1212 both John and Otto were engaged in power struggles against Pope Innocent III. In John's case his refusal to accept Innocent's candidate for Archbishop of Canterbury had led to Innocent placing an interdict on England, prohibiting clergy from conducting religious services (with limited exceptions), in 1208 and excommunicating John personally in 1209. Philip decided to take advantage of this situation, first in Germany, where he aided a German noble rebellion. John immediately threw England's weight behind Otto, and Philip saw an opportunity to launch an invasion of England. To secure the co-operation of all of his vassals in his plans for the invasion, Philip denounced John as an enemy of the Church, thereby justifying his attack as motivated by religious scruples. He summoned an assembly of French barons at Soissons, which was well attended with the exception of Ferdinand, Count of Flanders, who refused to attend. Philip was encouraged in all of this by the papal legate, Pandulf Verraccio.

Verraccio, however, was also holding secret discussions with John, who agreed to accept the legate's decision in ecclesiastical disputes. In return, the Pope offered John the kingdom of England and the lordship of Ireland as papal fiefs, which John would rule as the Pope's vassal, and for which John would do homage to the Pope. Once the treaty confirming this had been ratified in May 1213 Verraccio announced to Philip that he would have to abandon his expedition against John, since to attack a faithful vassal of the Holy See would constitute a mortal sin. He suggested that as Ferdinand had denied Philip's right to declare war on England while John was still excommunicated, his disobedience needed to be punished. Philip accepted the advice, and marched with his army into the territory of Flanders. It is possible that Philip saw this as a preliminary to an invasion of England. John declared support for Ferdinand, starting the Anglo-French War of 1213–1214.

== Prelude ==
At the time, galleys were used as purpose-built warships. They had long been used by the Mediterranean powers and had been adapted by the northern countries for use in the English Channel. Galleys could penetrate shallow harbours and were highly manoeuvrable, making them effective for raiding and ship-to-ship combat in meeting engagements. Operating the galleys was a specialist activity and called for highly trained crews. Both the English and the French relied on requisitioning cogs, the merchant vessels of the time, to supplement their navies. Cogs had a deep draught, a round hull and were propelled by a single large sail set on a mast amidships. Cogs were used as transports and could be converted into warships by the addition of wooden castles – raised fighting platforms – at the bow and stern and the erection of crow's nest fighting platforms at the masthead. Cogs typically had a displacement of 100–250 long tons (102–254 t). Their high freeboard made them superior to the oared vessels in close combat, particularly when they were fitted with the castles, from which missiles could be fired or stones dropped on to enemy craft alongside.

Contemporary chronicler William the Breton, the royal chaplain, who was in the French camp at the time, reported the French fleet as numbering some 1,700 ships. This number is considered improbably high by modern historians, who simply describe both fleets as "large". F. W. Brooks describes the figure of 1,700 ships for the French as "hopelessly exaggerated" and suggests that the actual size was less than 500, but of unknown breakdown between fighting ships and transports. Better figures are available for the English. In 1206 fifty galleys were recorded in royal service, operating in four squadrons. In 1211 there is a record of a fleet of over fifty ships, including twenty galleys. Building and maintaining fleets of this size was extremely expensive. In 1212 the fleet was costing over £3,500 per year; perhaps a quarter of the total royal revenue. For the 1213 campaign John attempted to requisition every English merchant ship capable of carrying six or more horses. 19th century historian Smedley estimates the English fleet at 500 ships; 20th century historian Brooks that it was "much inferior in point of numbers to the French fleet".

== Battle ==
The French fleet, originally assembled to carry troops to invade England, instead operated in a supporting role. It assembled at Boulogne, where Savari de Mauléon, a French minor noble who had served John for the previous eight years, was appointed its commander. Heavily laden with supplies, largely wine and bacon, the army's pay chests, and the personal goods of the French barons, it proceeded to Gravelines and then to the port of Damme, "among the most important commercial ports of Europe". Damme is located on the estuary of the Zwyn, now largely silted up. At the time it was in the County of Flanders (now in Belgium) and was the port of the city of Bruges. Meanwhile, the army marched via Cassel, Ypres, and Bruges before laying siege to Ghent. In England John had assembled his own fleet, which he sent to Flanders, under the command of William Longespée, Earl of Salisbury, to support his ally, Ferdinand, Count of Flanders, on 28 May 1213.

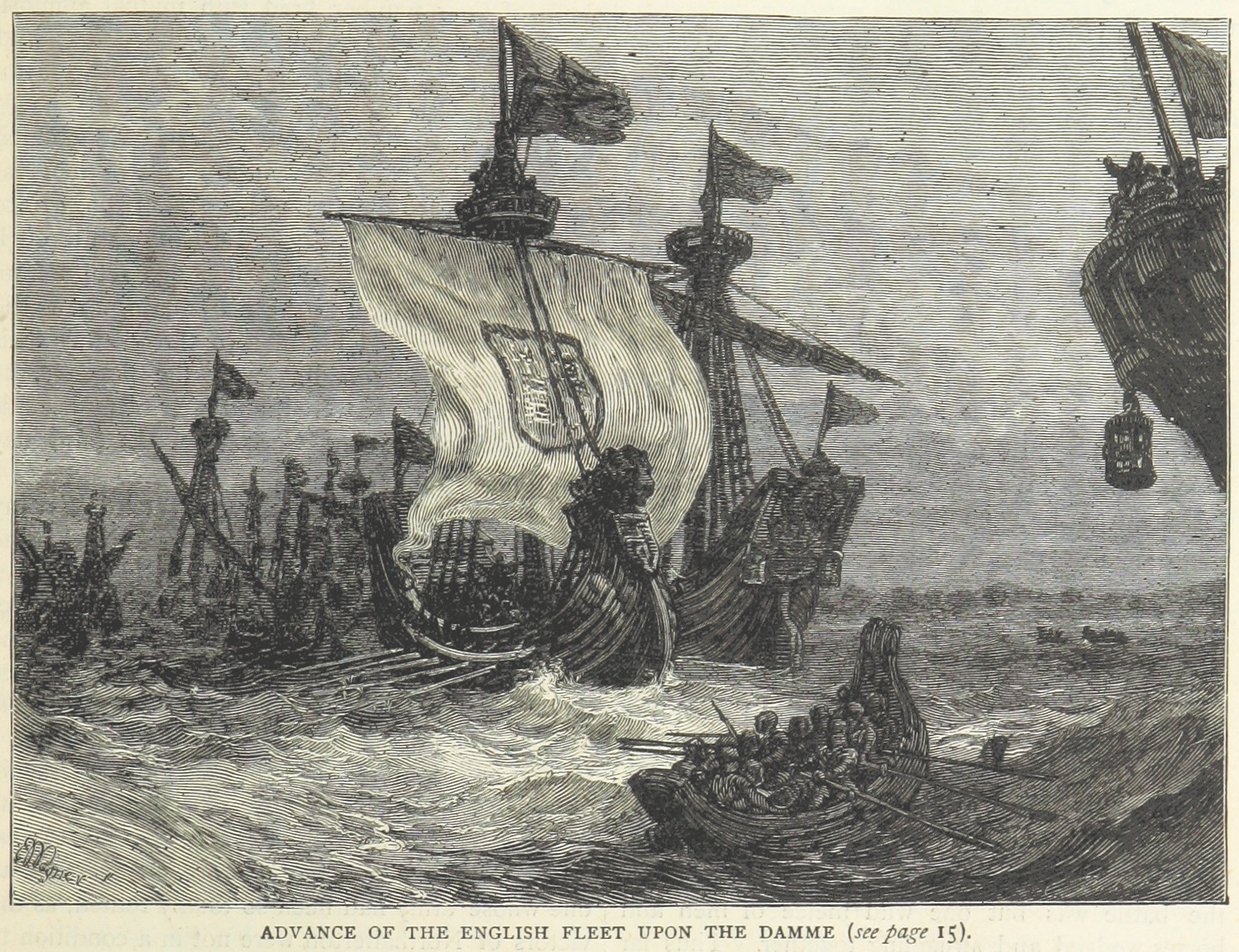
An 1873 illustration of the English attack

The English ships were carrying 700 English and Flemish men-at-arms and their attendants, and a large force of mercenaries. They entered the estuary of the Zwyn on 30 May, where they unexpectedly found the French armada. Most of the ships were pulled up on the beach. The French army was besieging Ghent, and many of the crews were pillaging the surrounding area. The English were surprised to discover the French fleet, at first believing them to be their Flemish allies. After scouting the roadstead to confirm the nationality and size of the fleet and discovering that the French ships were almost unmanned they attacked. They seized the 300 ships which were anchored and killed their crews. A further 100 ships were looted and then burnt on the beach after their crews had fled. The next day they attacked the rest of the ships and attempted an assault on Damme, which was repulsed. English and French chroniclers of the time all agree that the French lost approximately 400 ships.

The Flemish forces which had accompanied the English now disembarked and reconnoitered Damme. Finding it strongly garrisoned they bypassed it and advanced on Bruges. When Philip heard the news of the disaster behind him he broke off the siege of Ghent and marched for Damme. Part of his army encountered the Flemish army near Bruges and drove them off. His army reached Damme on 2 June, in time to relieve the French garrison. There, Philip found that groups of English ships were looting and capturing or firing his remaining ships almost at will. He was furious at the performance of the fleet. He suspected the loyalty of the crews, who were almost all from Poitiers or Normandy, until recently English possessions; and the loyalty of their commander, who until recently had led troops for the English. He had the surviving ships burned to prevent them from falling into English hands, and ordered the town of Damme to be burned as well. Determined to make the Flemish pay for his retreat, Phillip ordered that all towns be razed in every district he passed through, and that the peasantry be either killed or taken prisoner and sold as slaves. He extracted 30,000 marks from the Flemish cities he had captured as a ransom for the release of the hostages he had taken.

== Aftermath ==
The English fleet returned to England with the seized ships and a large booty; a contemporary writer claimed "never had so much treasure come into England since the days of King Arthur". The success at Damme dashed any French hopes of invading England that year and severely strained their resources, but did little to affect their army or its operations. Nevertheless, John began preparing for an invasion of France and a reconquest of his lost provinces. The English barons were initially unenthusiastic about the expedition, which delayed his departure, so it was not until February 1214 that he landed in France. John was to advance from the Loire, while his ally Otto made a simultaneous attack from Flanders, together with Ferdinand. John retook the county of Anjou, but was forced back after losing the Siege of Roche-au-Moine to Philip's son, Louis, on 2 July. Shortly after, Philip decisively defeated Otto and Ferdinand's army, which had assembled in the Low Countries, at the Battle of Bouvines. This ended John's hopes of regaining his continental lands.

De Mauléon returned to English service and in 1216 was appointed by John to the council of regency which governed England in the name of the new nine-year-old king, Henry III.
