= Stephen Longespée =

English knight

- Seneschal of Gascony; Justiciar of Ireland
- Arms of Stephen Longespée:Azure, six lions rampant or, a label of three gules
- Born: c. 1216
- Died: 1260
- Buried: Lacock Abbey, Wiltshire, England
- Noble family: Plantagenet
- Spouse: Emmeline de Riddlesford
- Issue: Emeline Longespée; Ela Longespée
- Father: William Longespée, Earl of Salisbury
- Mother: Ela, Countess of Salisbury

Stephen Longespée (c. 1216 – 1260) was an English knight who served as Seneschal of Gascony and as Justiciar of Ireland.

== Life ==
Longespée was a son of William Longespée, 3rd Earl of Salisbury and Ela of Salisbury. He was a cousin of the King Henry III of England. His wife Emmeline was an heiress of her grandfather Walter de Riddlesford, and brought possessions in Connacht and Leinster in Ireland. In 1255, Longespée was appointed Seneschal of Gascony, where his administration was hampered by disputes with his cousin King Edward. Edward returned to England in 1255. Longespée remained until 1257 as Seneschal, then also returned to England. When Edward reluctantly recognised the Provisions of Oxford in 1258, Longespée was one of the four counsellors given to accept the reform program. In 1259, Longespée was appointed Justiciar of Ireland. He died in 1260.

== Marriage and issue ==
Stephen married a distant cousin, Emmeline de Riddlesford, who was the widow of Hugh de Lacy, 1st Earl of Ulster, and the daughter of Walter de Riddlesford (son of another Walter de Riddlesford, and Amabilis Fitzhenry) and Annora Vitré. They had the following known issue:

- Emeline Longespée (died 1291), married Maurice FitzGerald, had issue
- Ela Longespée (died 1276), married Roger la Zouche, had issue.
