= Henry de Maunsfeld =

English philosopher, churchman and university chancellor

Henry de Maunsfeld DD (also Henry Mansfield, Maunsfeild, Maunsfield, Maunnesfeld, Mammesfeld, or Maymysfeld; died 1328) was an English medieval theologian, philosopher, churchman, college fellow, and university chancellor.

Henry de Maunsfeld was educated at Oxford University and became a Fellow of Merton College, Oxford and he received a Doctor of Divinity degree. He published on theology and philosophy. Between 1309 and 1313, he was for two periods Chancellor of the University of Oxford. He was professor of theology and Rector of Flintham in Nottinghamshire. On 17 December 1314, he was elected Dean of Lincoln, a post he held from 1315 to 1328. In 1316, he became the prebend of Asgarby, Lincolnshire. In 1319, he was elected Bishop of Lincoln, but he did not take up the position. In 1324, he was Canon of Carlisle and he died in 1328.

Academic offices
Preceded by William de Bosco	Chancellor of the University of Oxford; 1309–1311	Succeeded by Walter Giffard
Preceded by Walter Giffard	Chancellor of the University of Oxford; 1311–1313	Succeeded by Henry Harclay
