= Hugh le Despenser (sheriff) =

English nobleman, d. 1238

Sir Hugh le Despenser
- Arms of Despencer: Quarterly 1st & 4th: Argent; 2nd & 3rd: Gules, a fret or, over all a bend sable, adopted at the start of the heraldic era, c.1200–1215
- Died: 1238
- Occupation: nobleman
- Known for: wealthy landowner in the East Midlands of England, and served as High Sheriff of Berkshire
- Children: at least 3: Hugh le Despencer, 1st Baron le Despencer, Pernell le Despencer, Mary le Despencer
- Parents: Thomas Despencer (father); Rohese de Foix (mother)
- Relatives: Thomas Despencer (brother), Rohaise Despencer (sister)

Hugh le Despenser (died 1238) was a wealthy landowner in the East Midlands of England, and served as High Sheriff of Berkshire. Among his descendants were the infamous Despensers who became favourites of King Edward II.

== Origins ==
Despencer was the son of Thomas Despencer and N de Vere (whose identity is uncertain). He had siblings including Thomas Despencer (d.pre-October 1218), and Rohaise Despencer, who married Stephen de Segrave.

== Career ==
Despencer served as Sheriff of Staffordshire and Sheriff of Shropshire in 1222 and as Sheriff of Berkshire in 1226 and 1238. He held eleven manors in England, in the counties of Leicestershire, Yorkshire, Lincolnshire, and Rutland. He is reported to have been instrumental in the repairs made in 1232 to Porchester Castle in Hampshire, including a new forebuilding to the keep and portcullises for the gatehouses, with repairs to the wall and great hall.

== Marriage and issue ==
With his wife, Mary de Quincy, Despencer had at least three children:

- Hugh le Despencer, 1st Baron le Despencer (died 1265), a supporter of Simon de Montfort, with whom he died at the Battle of Evesham, opposing King Henry III.
- Pernell le Despencer, who married Geoffrey Savage;
- Mary le Despencer, who married Roger St John.
