= Walter de Wetheringsete =

English theologian and university chancellor

Walter de Wetheringsete was an English medieval theologian and university chancellor.

Walter de Wetheringsete was a Doctor of Divinity. He was elected as Chancellor of the University of Oxford by 8 November 1302.

Academic offices
Preceded by James de Cobeham	Chancellor of the University of Oxford; 1302–1304	Succeeded by Simon de Faversham
