= Simon of Faversham =

English philosopher and university chancellor

Simon of Faversham (also Simon Favershamensis, Simon de Faverisham, Simon von Faversham, or Simon Anglicus; c. 1260–1306) was an English medieval scholastic philosopher and later a university chancellor.

Simon of Faversham was born in Faversham, Kent, and educated at Oxford, receiving a Master of Arts degree. He probably taught in Paris during the 1280s. His philosophical work consists almost entirely of commentaries on Aristotle's works. He was made Chancellor of Oxford University in January 1304 until his death in 1306.

Academic offices
Preceded by Walter de Wetheringsete	Chancellor of the University of Oxford; 1304–1306	Succeeded by Walter Burdun
