= James de Cobeham =

English Canon law jurist and university chancellor

- Born: Before 1300
- Occupations: medieval Canon law jurist and university chancellor
- Known for: Chancellor of the University of Oxford

James de Cobeham (also de Cobham) was an English medieval Canon law jurist and university chancellor.

James de Cobeham was a Professor of Canon law. He was elected as Chancellor of the University of Oxford between 1300 and 1302.

Academic offices
Preceded by Richard de Clyve	Chancellor of the University of Oxford; 1300–1302	Succeeded by Walter de Wetheringsete
