= Richard de Clyve =

English university chancellor

Richard de Clyve was an English medieval university chancellor.

Richard de Clyve was at Merton College, Oxford. He was elected as Chancellor of the University of Oxford between 1297 and 1300. He may have been Abbot of Abingdon.

Academic offices
Preceded by Roger de Weseham	Chancellor of the University of Oxford; 1297–1300	Succeeded by James de Cobeham
