= Hugh Despenser (justiciar) =

English judge and baron (1223–1265)

Hugh le Despenser
- Arms of Despenser: Quarterly 1st & 4th: Argent; 2nd & 3rd: Gules, a fret or, over all a bend sable

Chief Justiciar
- In office 1260 – May 1261
- Monarch: Henry III
- Preceded by: Hugh Bigod
- Succeeded by: Philip Basset

Chief Justiciar
- In office July 1263 – 4 August 1265
- Monarch: Henry III
- Preceded by: Philip Basset
- Succeeded by: none

Personal details
- Born: 1223
- Died: 4 August 1265 (aged 41–42) Evesham
- Party: Barons
- Spouse: Aline Basset
- Children: Hugh le Despenser; Eleanor le Despenser
- Parents: Hugh le Despenser (father); Mary de Quincy (mother)

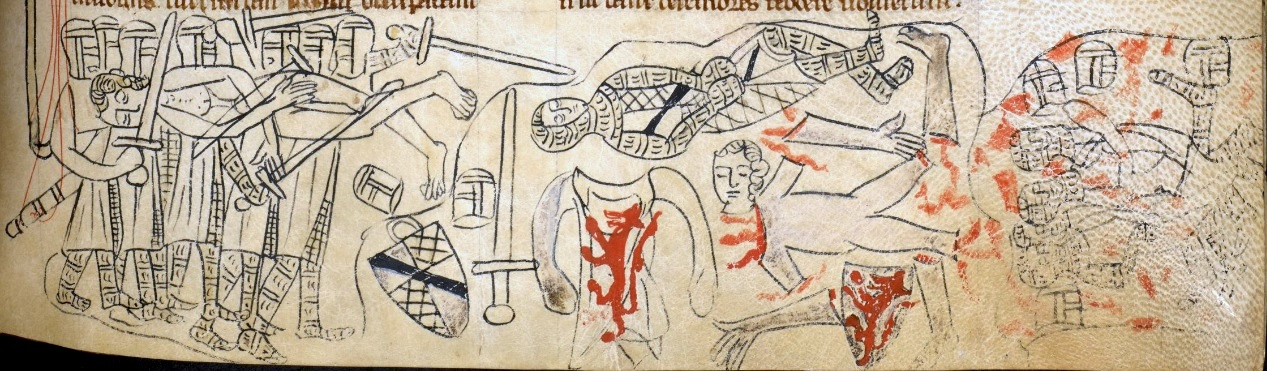
The fully clothed and armed dead body of Hugh le Despenser at the Battle of Evesham (with his arms on his surcoat and on his discarded shield), above the naked and dismembered body of Simon de Montfort. Near-contemporary drawing, British Library Cotton MS Nero D ii, f. 177

Hugh le Despenser, 1st Baron le Despenser (1223 – 4 August 1265) was an important ally of Simon de Montfort during the reign of Henry III. He served briefly as Justiciar of England in 1260 and as Constable of the Tower of London.

Despenser first played an important part in 1258, when he was prominent on the baronial side in the Mad Parliament of Oxford. In 1260 the barons chose him to succeed Hugh Bigod as Justiciar, and in 1263 the king was further compelled to put the Tower of London in his hands.

He was the son of Hugh le Despenser and was summoned to Parliament by Simon de Montfort. Hugh was summoned as Baron le Despenser on 14 December 1264 and was Chief Justiciar of England and a leader of the baronial party, so he might be deemed a baron, though the legality of that assembly is doubtful. He remained allied with Montfort to the end, and was present at the Battle of Lewes. He was killed fighting on de Montfort's side at the Battle of Evesham in August 1265. He was slain by Roger Mortimer, 1st Baron Wigmore; this caused a feud to begin between the Despenser and Mortimer families.

By his wife, Aline Basset, he was father of Hugh Despenser 'the elder', who became an advisor to Edward II and was made Earl of Winchester. Aline was the daughter of Philip Basset, who had also served as Justiciar. They also had a daughter named Eleanor le Despenser, who married Sir Hugh de Courtenay, feudal baron of Okehampton.

Preceded by Hugh Bigod	Chief Justiciar; 1260–1261	Succeeded by Philip Basset
Preceded by Philip Basset	Chief Justiciar; 1263–1265	Succeeded by none
