= Eustace de Normanville =

English academic and university chancellor

Eustace de Normanville (also Eustachius de Normanvyle) was an English medieval academic and university chancellor.

Eustace de Normanville was a Master of Arts and Doctor of Decrees. From 1276 to 1280, he was Chancellor of the University of Oxford.

Academic offices
Preceded by William de Bosco	Chancellor of the University of Oxford; 1276–1280	Succeeded by John de Pontissara
