= Walter de Riddlesford =

Anglo-Norman lord

- Born: Walter; Carriebenan, County Kildare, Ireland
- Died: 1226
- Spouse: Amabilis Fitzhenry

Walter de Riddlesford (fl. 1150 – d. 1226) was an Anglo-Norman lord who was granted in Ireland the baronies of Bray, County Wicklow and Kilkea, County Kildare between 1171 and 1176.

De Riddlesford was born in Carriebenan, Kildare, Ireland. He married a daughter of Henry fitz Henry named Amabilis Fitzhenry.

He built a castle in Bray, located on the south side of the Dargle River, a short distance to the west of the existing Bray Bridge which may have included a mote some time after acquiring the land c.1173. this castle would have been on the south side of the river Dargle a short distance upstream from the existing bridge in Bray.

He built a motte-and-bailey fortress on the site of what is now Kilkea Castle in County Kildare in 1181.

He died in 1226 and was succeeded by his son Walter. His granddaughter, Emmeline, married Hugh de Lacy, 1st Earl of Ulster (as his second wife) and, then, Stephen Longespée, son of William Longespée, 3rd Earl of Salisbury and grandson of Henry II of England (one of their daughters was Ela Longespee).
