= Philip Basset =

Justiciar of England

Chief Justiciar of England
- In office May 1261 – July 1263
- Monarch: Henry III
- Preceded by: Hugh le Despencer, 1st Baron le Despencer
- Succeeded by: Hugh le Despencer, 1st Baron le Despencer

Personal details
- Born: c. 1185
- Died: 19 October 1271
- Party: Royal
- Spouse(s): Hawise, granddaughter of Godfrey of Louvain (d.1226), Ela Longespée, daughter of William
- Relations: Hugh le Despencer, 1st Baron le Despencer, son-in-law
- Children: Aline Basset; Margery Basset

Philip Basset (c. 1185 – 19 October 1271) was the Justiciar of England.

Philip was the son of Alan Basset of High Wycombe in Buckinghamshire. His elder brothers were Gilbert, a baronial leader, and Fulk, who became bishop of London.

Basset inherited the manor of Wycombe; the town received market borough status in 1237.

Basset served as the Justiciar of England between the two terms served by his son-in-law, Hugh le Despencer, 1st Baron le Despencer. He served during the period that Henry III regained control of the government from the barons.

Basset was married twice. By Hawise, granddaughter of Godfrey of Louvain (d.1226), he had two daughters:

- Aline, who married firstly Hugh le Despencer, 1st Baron le Despencer and secondly Roger Bigod, 5th Earl of Norfolk
- Margery, who married Sir John FitzJohn.

Political offices
Preceded by Hugh le Despencer, 1st Baron le Despencer	Chief Justiciar; 1261–1263	Succeeded by Hugh le Despencer, 1st Baron le Despencer
