= William Longespée the Younger =

English crusader

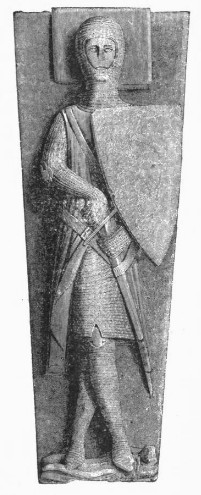
Effigy of Longespée in Salisbury Cathedral

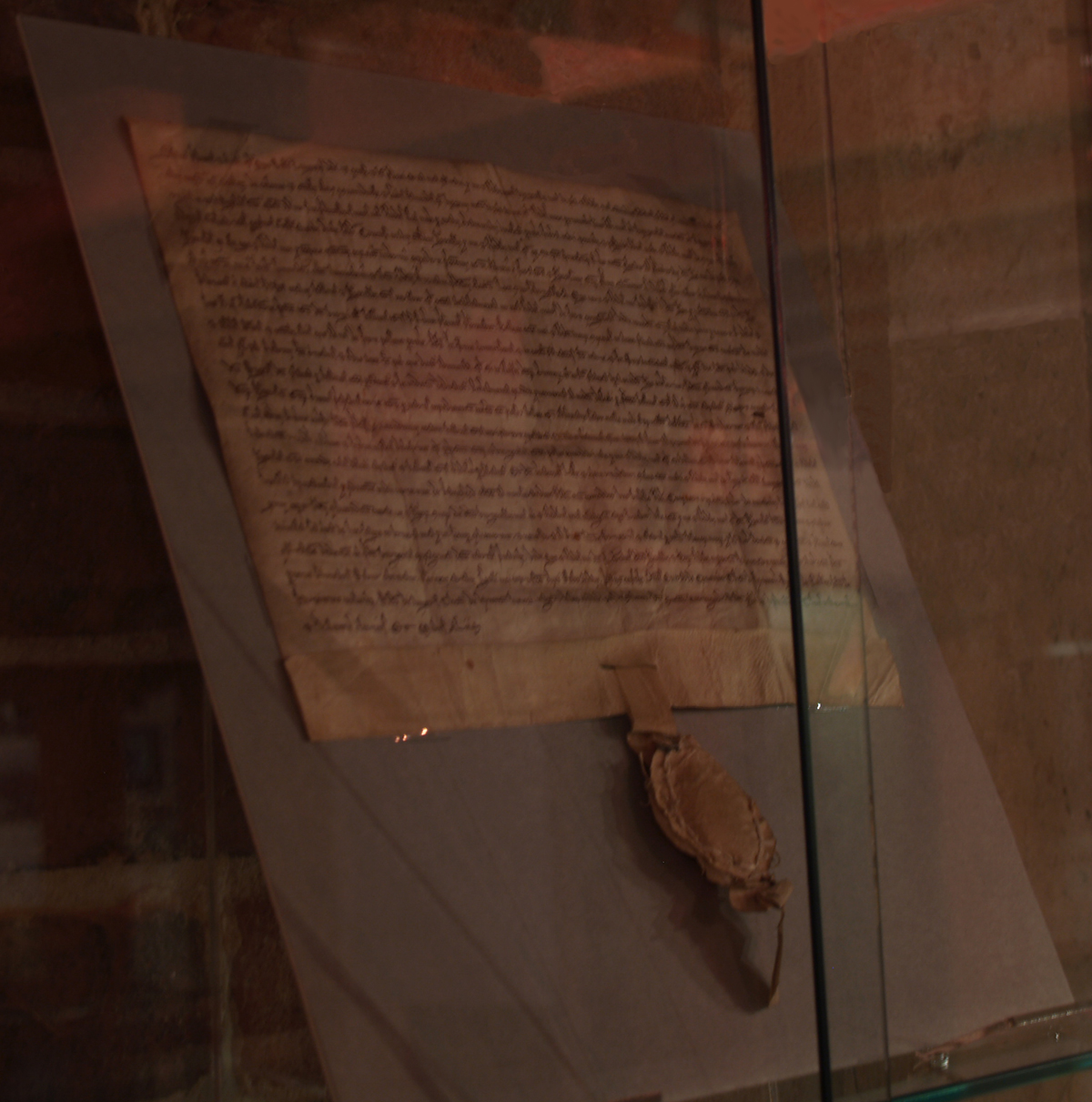
The Charter for the town of Poole issued by Longespée

Sir William Longespée (c. 1212 – 8 February 1250) was an English knight and crusader, the son of William Longespée and Ela, Countess of Salisbury. His death became of significant importance to the English psyche, having died at the Battle of Mansurah, near Al-Mansurah in Egypt.

== Biography ==
=== Barons' Crusade ===
The first of Longespée's two pilgrimages to the Holy Land was as a participant in the second wave of crusaders of the Barons' Crusade. On 10 June 1240 he left England in the service of Richard, 1st Earl of Cornwall with roughly a dozen English barons and several hundred knights. They made their way to Marseilles in mid-September, and landed at Acre on 8 October. Longespée and Richard's men saw no combat there, but this group did complete the negotiations for a truce with Ayyubid leaders made by Theobald I of Navarre just a few months prior during the first wave of the crusade. They rebuilt Ascalon castle, and notably handed over custody of it to Walter Pennenpié, the imperial agent of Frederick II in Jerusalem (instead of turning it over to the local liege men of the Kingdom of Jerusalem who strongly opposed Frederick's rule). On 13 April 1241 they exchanged Muslim prisoners with Christian captives who had been seized during Henry II of Bar's disastrous raid at Gaza five months earlier. They also moved the remains of those killed in that battle and buried them at the cemetery in Ascalon. Longespée almost certainly departed with Richard for England on 3 May 1241.

=== Seventh Crusade ===
Longespée again made a pilgrimage to the Holy Land, this time in the Seventh Crusade of 1247. He proceeded to Rome and made a plea to Pope Innocent IV for support:

"Sir, you see that I am signed with the cross and am on my journey with the King of France to fight in this pilgrimage. My name is great and of note, viz., William Longespée, but my estate is slender, for the King of England, my kinsman and liege lord, hath bereft me of the title of earl and of that estate, but this he did judiciously, and not in displeasure, and by the impulse of his will; therefore I do not blame him for it. Howbeit, I am necessitated to have recourse to your holiness for favour, desiring your assistance in this distress. We see here (quoth he) that Earl Richard (of Cornwall) who, though he is not signed with the cross, yet, through the especial grace of your holiness, he hath got very much money from those who are signed, and therefore, I, who am signed and in want, do intreat the like favour."

Having succeeded in gaining the favour of the Pope, Longespée raised a company of 200 English horse to join with King Louis on his crusade. To raise funds for his expedition, he sold a charter of liberties to the burgesses of the town of Poole in 1248 for 70 marks, and another to the town of Wareham. During the Seventh Crusade, Longespée commanded the English forces. He became widely known for his feats of chivalry and his subsequent martyrdom. The circumstances of his death served to fuel growing English animosity toward the French; it is reported that the French Count d'Artois lured Longespée into attacking the Mameluks before the forces of King Louis arrived in support. D'Artois, Longespée and his men, along with 280 Knights Templar, were killed at this time.

It is said that his mother, Countess Ela, had a vision of the martyr being received into heaven by angels on the day of his death. In 1252, the Sultan delivered Longespée's remains to a messenger who conveyed them to Acre for burial at the church of St Cross. However, his effigy is found amongst family members at Salisbury Cathedral, in England (though it is now identified as 14th century).

Matthew Paris describes Longespée's death:

Said Robert of Artois : 'Oh William! God fights against us-we can no longer hold out. I advise you save yourself alive, if you can, by flight, whilst your horse has strength to carry you, lest when you wish to you no longer can.' To whom William replied curtly, as the tumult permitted.' Please God, the son of my father shall never fly from any Saracen I would rather die a good death than live a base life'. Then the Count of Artois fled to the river and was drowned, and the French were scattered and slain. When William, on whom the Saracens turned their attack, saw this, he knew that his life was forfeit. Man-fully he bore up against all assailants, and cutting in pieces many, sent their souls to Hell. Yet though his horse had succumbed and his own feet were cut off still he continued to lop off the hands, heads, and feet, of such as attacked him. And then, after sustaining many blows and wounds, with blood gushing out, and overwhelmed by the stones of his assailants, he, a most glorious martyr, breathed out his soul, that sped forth to assume its crown. And with him died his Standard Bearer, Robert de Vere, an excellent knight, and many other English, who had followed in his tracks, guided by the trail he left behind him.

Another account of William Longsword's death is written in a poem, although it may pure fiction, from eye witness or from tradition.

The Master of the Temple urges on his horse, Longsword the Earl unfurls his banner. They were the foremost, right valiant were they. Thus they rode in to Mansoora as into their own stables. In the midst of Mansoora runs a great road, from the gate of the river gradually descending. There fought those gallant knights, There were many bloody heads among the Saracens that day. The Count of Artois on his great charger had neither heart nor stomach to tarry longer, the first man he encountered he threw to the ground, then he turned towards the river and betook him to drown; His soul is in hell -in great torment.- The Master of the Temple was named William, A felon heathen came up, pierced him with the sword through the body below the arm, and his soul St. Michael bore away singing. Earl Longsword sold himself dear before he died, he broke through another squadron, he and five other with him, and before vespers yielded his soul a martyr Here follow the exploits of his five followers: Wymond af Ascalon, Robert of Widel, Ralph of Henfield, Alexander of Giffard, and John of Bretain. Longsword begs Giffard if he escapes to execute his will and take charge of his possessions. A Norman Knight urges him to escape by the river :Longsword replies 'He shall it be reproach to an English knight that I fled for fear of any accursed Saracen. I cam hither to serve God and will die for him, but before I die I will send myself dear.' Longsword leaned on the shoulders of the friar (Richard of Ascalon) His sharp sword in his hand, he had but one foot left. A Saracen Emir tries to persuade him to surrender, but in vain, and he goes on fighting furiously. Then was his frair body sorely maimed, his left foot missing, and his right hand cut off. He prays to Christ that he may be avenged on this hateful race, and on fighting with his left hand Then fell to earth the gallant Longsword, who could no longer stand upon one foot. The Saracens rushed up joyful and exhulting, and utterly devoured him with their sharp swords.

The Alexander Giffard mentioned in the poem as Longsword's confidant did escape, wounded in five places. In the next generation of his family is found intermarried with the Longswords.

== Marriage and issue ==
Longespée married Idoine de Camville, daughter of Richard de Camville and Eustacia Basset, and granddaughter of Nicola de la Haie. They had three sons and a daughter:

- Ela Longespée, married James Audley (1220–1272), of Heleigh Castle, Staffordshire, son of Henry De Audley and Bertha de Mesnilwarin
- William III Longespée, married Maud de Clifford, granddaughter of Llewelyn ap Iorwerth, Prince of North Wales in 1254. William died in 1257, in the lifetime of his grandmother Ela of Salisbury, 3rd Countess of Salisbury. Margaret, the daughter of William and Maud, married Henry de Lacy, 3rd Earl of Lincoln.
- Richard Longespée, married Alice le Rus, daughter of William le Rus of Suffolk and died shortly before 27 December 1261.
- Edmund Longespée, the Book of Lacock Abbey names "Guill(ielmum) Lungespee tertium, Ric(ard)um, Elam et Edmundum" as the children of "Guill(ielmus) Lungespee secundus" and his wife.

== Sources ==
- Gee, Loveday Lewes (2002). Women, Art and Patronage from Henry III to Edward III: 1216-1377. Boydell Press.
- Lloyd, Simon (1991). "William Longespee II: The Making of an English Crusading Hero (Part I)". Nottingham Medieval Studies. 35: 41–69. doi:10.1484/J.NMS.3.191.
- The Times Kings & Queens of The British Isles, by Thomas Cussans (chart's 30 & 86) ISBN 0-00-714195-5
- Ancestral Roots of Certain American Colonists Who Came to America Before 1700 by Frederick Lewis Weis, Lines 30-27 and 122-30
