= Ela of Salisbury, 3rd Countess of Salisbury =

13th-century English noblewoman

Ela of Salisbury
- suo jure Countess of Salisbury
- Born: 1187; Amesbury, Wiltshire, England
- Died: 24 August 1261 (aged 73–74); Lacock Abbey, Wiltshire
- Noble family: de Salisbury
- Spouse: William Longespée
- Issue among others...: William II Longespée; Nicholas Longespée, Bishop of Salisbury
- Father: William FitzPatrick, 2nd Earl of Salisbury
- Mother: Eléonore de Vitré

Ela of Salisbury, 3rd Countess of Salisbury (1187 – 24 August 1261) was an English peeress. She succeeded to the title in her own right in 1196 upon the death of her father, William FitzPatrick, 2nd Earl of Salisbury.

Ela married William Longespée, an illegitimate half-brother of kings Richard I and John, who thus became Earl of Salisbury, in 1196. Ela held the post of High Sheriff of Wiltshire for two years after William's death, then became a nun, and eventually Abbess of Lacock Abbey in Wiltshire, which she had founded in 1229.

== Family ==
Ela was born in Amesbury, Wiltshire in 1187, the only child and heiress of William FitzPatrick, 2nd Earl of Salisbury, Sheriff of Wiltshire and Eléonore de Vitré (c. 1164–1232/1233). (Note: The earls of Salisbury are sometimes mistakenly assigned the surname "d'Evreux", but it is spurious, arising from confusion over the nickname of a fictitious ancestor, Walter le Ewrus (Walter the Fortunate). The family of the earls of Salisbury never used the name "d'Evreux", they do not descend from the Norman counts of Evreux, nor do the later Devereux derive from them. See Cokayne, George (1982). The Complete Peerage of England, Scotland, Ireland, Great Britain, and the United Kingdom, Extant, Extinct, or Dormant. Vol. XI. Gloucester England: A. Sutton. p. 373, note (b). ISBN 0-904387-82-8.) In 1196, she succeeded her father as suo jure 3rd Countess of Salisbury. There is a story that immediately following her father's death she was imprisoned in a castle in Normandy by one of her paternal uncles who wished to take her title and enormous wealth for himself. According to the legend, Ela was eventually rescued by William Talbot, a knight who had gone to France where he sang ballads under windows in all the castles of Normandy until he received a response from Ela. (Note: This story is similar to that of the (contemporary) imprisonment of Richard I and his apparent recovery by Blondel de Nesle)

In 1198, Ela's mother married her fourth husband, Gilbert de Malesmains.

== Marriage and issue ==
In 1196, the same year she became countess and inherited her father's numerous estates, Ela married William Longespée, an illegitimate son of King Henry II, by his mistress Ida de Tosny. (Note: Ida later married Roger Bigod, 2nd Earl of Norfolk)

The couple had been betrothed earlier, but Ela was the King's ward until she reached the age of majority. William was approximately 13 years older than Ela. After the marriage, Longespée became 3rd Earl of Salisbury by right of his wife. The Continuator of Florence recorded that their marriage had been arranged by King Richard I, who was William's legitimate half-brother.

Together, William and Ela had at least eight or possibly nine children:

- William II Longespée, titular Earl of Salisbury (c. 1209 – 7 February 1250), married in 1226 Idoine de Camville, daughter of Richard de Camville and Eustache Basset, by whom he had four children. William was killed while on crusade at the Battle of Mansurah. His son William III Longespée died in 1257, in the lifetime of his grandmother Ela. Ela's heiress was William III's daughter Margaret Longespée who died in 1310.
- Richard Longespée, clerk and canon of Salisbury.
- Stephen Longespée, Seneschal of Gascony and Justiciar of Ireland (1216–1260), married as his second wife 1243/1244 Emmeline de Ridelsford, daughter of Walter de Ridelsford and Annora Vitré, by whom he had two daughters: Ela, wife of Sir Roger La Zouche, and Emmeline (1252–1291), the second wife of Maurice FitzGerald, 3rd Lord of Offaly.
- Nicholas Longespée, Bishop of Salisbury (died 28 May 1297)
- Isabella Longespée (died before 1244), married William de Vescy, Lord of Alnwick, as his first wife shortly after 16 May 1226, by whom she had issue.
- Petronilla Longespée, died unmarried
- Ela Longespée, who first married Thomas de Beaumont, 6th Earl of Warwick, and then married Philip Basset. No issue.
- Ida Longespée, married firstly Ralph who was son of Ralph de Somery, Baron of Dudley, and Margaret, daughter of John Marshal; she married secondly William de Beauchamp, Baron of Bedford, by whom she had six children, including Maud de Beauchamp, wife of Roger de Mowbray. (Note: This Ida is sometimes confused with Ida II Longespée, who married Sir Walter FitzRobert of Woodham Walter, Essex, by whom she had issue including Ela FitzWalter, wife of William de Odyngsells. Ida II Longespée has been given different parents by different genealogists; G. Andrews Moriarty suggested the two Idas were sisters; Gerald Paget suggests Ida II who married Walter FitzRobert may have been the daughter of William Longespée II, Earl of Salisbury, by his wife, Idoine de Camville.)
- Ida II de Longespée (she is alternatively listed as William and Ela's granddaughter: see notes below), married Sir Walter FitzRobert, son of Robert Fitzwalter, by whom she had issue including Ela FitzWalter, wife of William de Odyngsells. Ela's and William's grandsons include William de Clinton and John de Grey.
- Mary Longespée, married. No issue.
- Pernel Longespée.

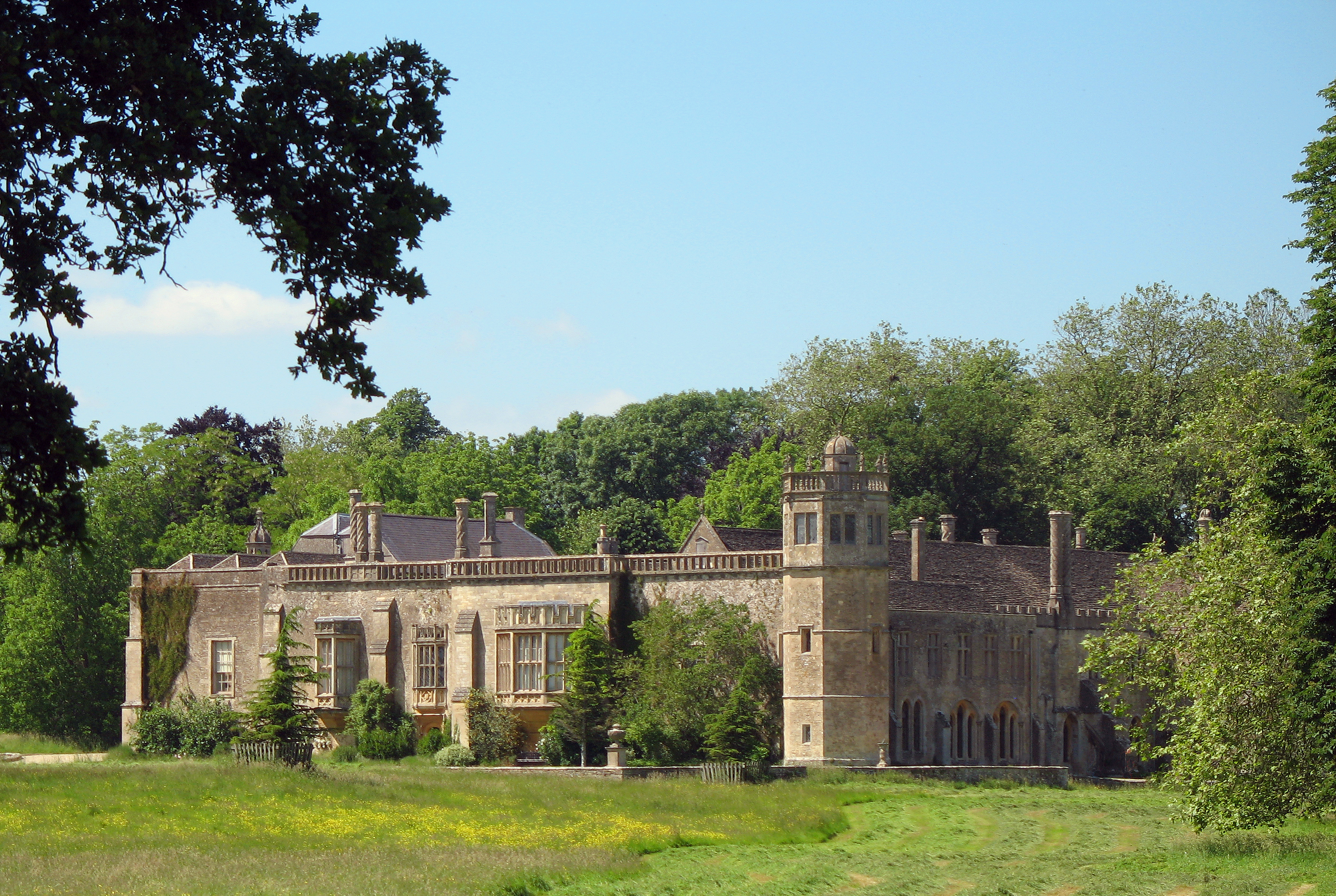
Lacock Abbey, founded in 1229 by Ela, Countess of Salisbury

== Later life ==
In 1225, Ela's husband William was shipwrecked off the coast of Brittany, upon returning from Gascony. He spent months recovering at a monastery on the Island of Ré in France. He died at Salisbury Castle on 7 March 1226 just days after arriving in England. Ela inherited the post of Sheriff of Wiltshire and held that position for two years following her husband's death. She never remarried; some historians suggest that she did not remarry because her new husband would have become the earl and she wanted that role reserved for her eldest son.

Six years later in 1232, Ela founded Lacock Abbey in Wiltshire as a nunnery of the Augustinian order. In 1238, she gave up all rights to the county of Wiltshire. She entered the abbey as a nun; she was made Abbess of Lacock in 1240, and held the post until 1257. The Book of Lacock recorded that Ela founded the monasteries at Lacock and Hinton in Somerset (Hinton Charterhouse). During her tenure as abbess, Ela obtained many rights for the abbey and village of Lacock. She gave up that role in 1243 due to age and health issues.

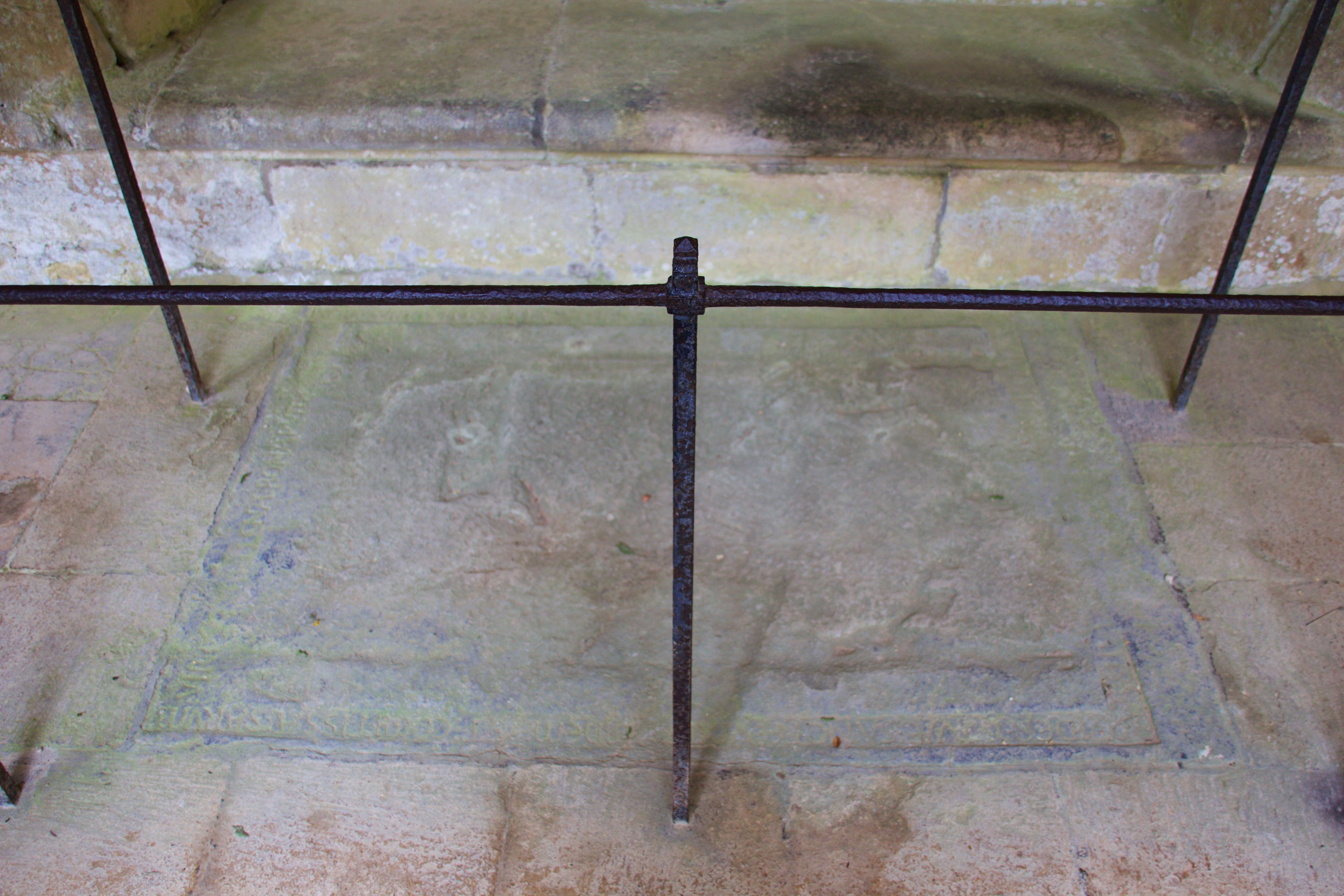
Ela's tombstone at Lacock Abbey

Ela died on 24 August 1261 and was buried in Lacock Abbey. The inscription on her tombstone, written in Latin, reads:

Below lie buried the bones of the venerable Ela, who gave this sacred house as a home for the nuns. She also had lived here as holy abbess and Countess of Salisbury, full of good works

Ela has been described as having been "one of the two towering female figures of the mid-13th century", the other one being Margaret de Quincy, Countess of Lincoln.

== Sources ==
- Gee, Loveday Lewes (2002). Women, Art and Patronage from Henry III to Edward III: 1216-1377. The Boydell Press. ISBN 978-0851158617.

Peerage of England
Preceded by William of Salisbury	Countess of Salisbury; 1196–1261 with William Longespée (1196–1226)	Succeeded by Margaret Longespée
