= William of Salisbury, 2nd Earl of Salisbury =

Anglo-Norman peer (died 1196)

William of Salisbury, 2nd Earl of Salisbury (died 1196) was an Anglo-Norman peer. Though he is generally known as such, his proper title was Earl of Wiltshire, which title was conferred on his father by the Empress Matilda around 1143. He was also called William FitzPatrick. He was the son and heir of Patrick of Salisbury, Earl of Wiltshire, styled Earl of Salisbury, and Adela of Ponthieu, Countess of Surrey.

== Family ==
William married Eléonore, daughter of Robert III de Vitré, Baron of Vitré in Brittany. Their only daughter and heiress was Ela of Salisbury, 3rd Countess of Salisbury who married William Longespée, 3rd Earl of Salisbury.

== Service to Richard I ==
William bore the golden sceptre at the coronation of King Richard I, but the next year when the king became a prisoner by Emperor Henry VI, he was one of those who adhered to the then Count of Mortain, who later became King John of England. In 1194 he served as High Sheriff of Somerset and Dorset. In 1195, William was back with King Richard in the expedition into Normandy and upon his return to England was one of Richard's great council assembled at Nottingham. The Earl of Salisbury was one of the four earls who supported the canopy of state at the second coronation of Richard that same year.

== Sources ==
- Gee, Loveday Lewes (2002). Women, Art and Patronage from Henry III to Edward III: 1216-1377. The Boydell Press. ISBN 978-0851158617.

Peerage of England
Preceded by Patrick	Earl of Salisbury; 1168–1196	Succeeded by Ela
