= Nicholas Longespee =

13th-century Bishop of Salisbury

- Bishop of Salisbury
- Elected: between 8 November and 12 December 1291
- Term ended: 18 May 1297
- Predecessor: William de la Corner
- Successor: Simon of Ghent
- Other post: Treasurer of Salisbury

Orders
- Consecration: 16 March 1292

Personal details
- Died: 18 May 1297
- Denomination: Catholic

Nicholas Longespee was a medieval Bishop of Salisbury.

Longespee was the son of Ela, 3rd Countess of Salisbury, and William Longespee. He was a canon of Salisbury Cathedral before 1272 and held the office of treasurer of the diocese of Salisbury before 1275. He also held the position of rector of Lacock. Nicholas Longespee was also appointed as the Rector of The Parish of Wyke Regis in Weymouth in 1263. In his will he left money for the relief of the poor in Wyke Regis.

Longespee was elected bishop between 8 November and 12 December 1291 and consecrated on 16 March 1292. He died 18 May 1297. He was buried at Salisbury, but his heart was buried at Lacock and his viscera at Ramsbury.

== Citations ==
Catholic Church titles
Preceded by William de la Corner	Bishop of Salisbury; 1291–1297	Succeeded by Simon of Ghent
