= Thomas de Beaumont, 6th Earl of Warwick =

Arms of "Thomas, Earl of Warwick" as blazoned in several 13th-century rolls of arms, including Collins' Roll, Glover's Roll, Walford's Roll, etc.: Checky azure and or a chevron ermine. These arms are generally referred to as "Newburgh", being the alternative name of the early Beaumont family; they were quartered by the later Beauchamp Earls of Warwick

Thomas de Beaumont, 6th Earl of Warwick (1208 – 26 June 1242), Earl of Warwick, Baron of Hocknorton (Hook Norton) and Headington, was the son of Henry de Beaumont, 5th Earl of Warwick and Margaret D'Oili. He was also known as Thomas de Henry.

Although he had attained his majority at the death of his father, he did not get full possession of the earldom until four years later, when he was girt with the Sword of Knighthood; this took place at Gloucester where the King was spending Whitsuntide. He inherited his uncle's (Henry D'Oili) Oxfordshire estate and owned the Manor of Bewdley, Worcester and rendered service for it, of a fully equipped archer for twenty days, as often as there was war against the Welsh. In 1241, he paid one hundred and eighty marks scutage in order that he might be excused attendance on Henry III of England in the expedition to Gascony. This was in excess of the sum due from him; the following year he paid a further one hundred and twenty marks. At the coronation of Eleanor of Provence, the Queen Consort of Henry III, on 26 June 1236 he bore the third Sword of State, claiming that it was his hereditary right to do so.

He married Ela Longespee, daughter of William Longespée, 3rd Earl of Salisbury, natural son to Henry II. Amongst Ela's benefactions were grants to the monks at Reading, Berkshire, the Canons of Osney, Oxfordshire, St Sepulchre's, Warwick, the grey friars in London, and the Nuns of Godstow, Oxford. In 1295, she gave land to the University of Oxford, from which a certain amount of the income was to be paid to the fellows of Merton College that they might perform masses for her soul.

== Sources ==
- Edward T. Beaumont, J.P. The Beaumonts in History. A.D. 850-1850. Oxford.
- Pollock, M.A. (2015). Scotland, England and France after the Loss of Normandy, 1204-1296: 'Auld Amitie'. The Boydell Press.

Peerage of England
Preceded by Henry de Beaumont	Earl of Warwick; 1229–1242	Succeeded by Margaret de Beaumont
