= Simon of Ghent =

13th and 14th-century Bishop of Salisbury

- Bishop of Salisbury
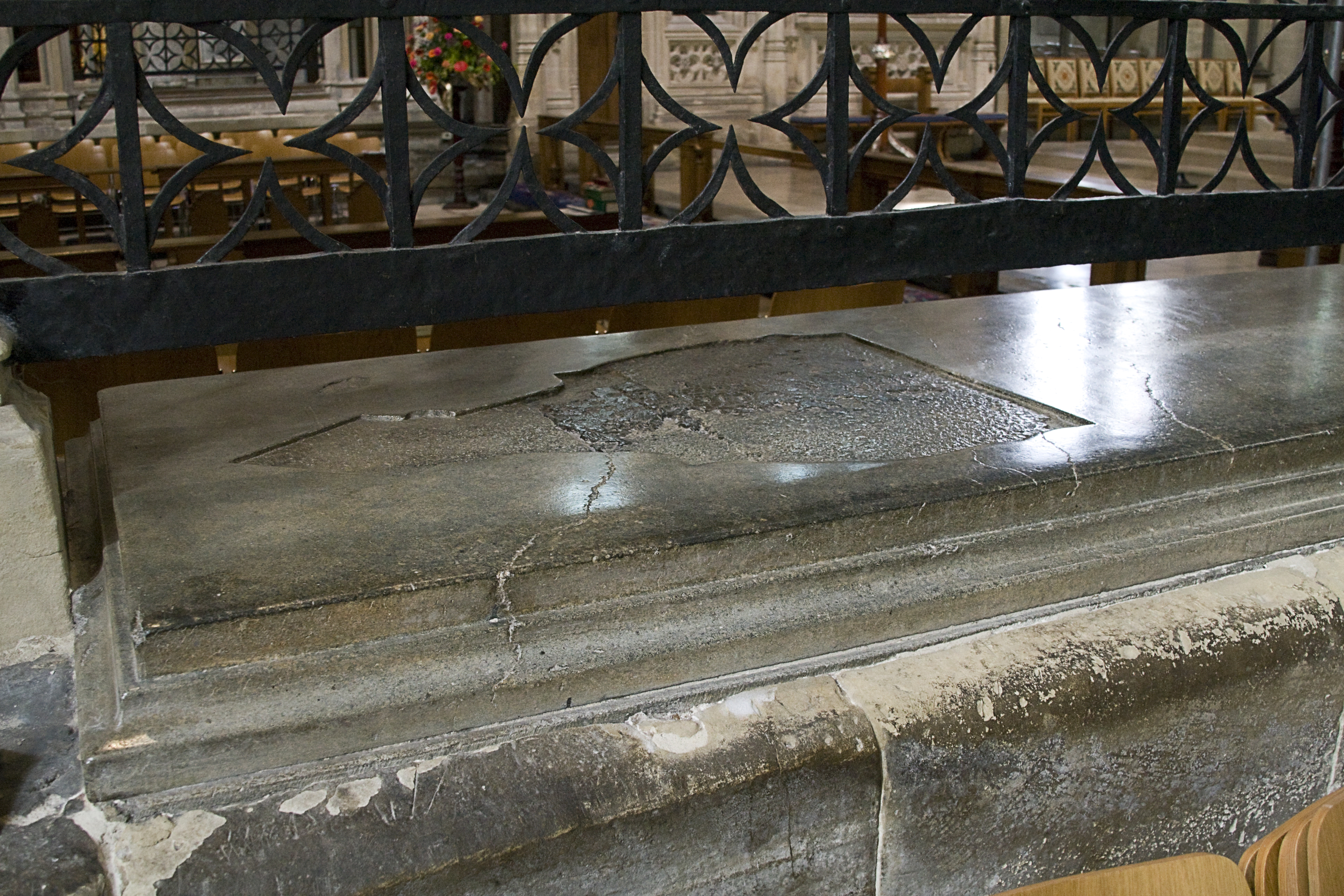
- Simon's tomb in Salisbury Cathedral
- Elected: 2 June 1297
- Term ended: 2 April 1315
- Predecessor: Nicholas Longespee
- Successor: Roger Martival
- Other posts: Archdeacon of Oxford; Chancellor of the University of Oxford

Orders
- Consecration: 20 October 1297

Personal details
- Died: 2 April 1315
- Denomination: Catholic

Simon of Ghent (or Simon de Gandavo; died 1315) was a medieval Bishop of Salisbury in England.

Simon was a prebendary of the diocese of Salisbury and Chancellor of Oxford University, as well as Archdeacon of Oxford.

Simon was elected bishop on 2 June 1297 and consecrated on 20 October 1297 at Canterbury He died on 2 April 1315.

== Citations ==
Academic offices
Preceded by John of Monmouth	Chancellor of the University of Oxford; 1291–1293	Succeeded by Henry Swayne? or Roger de Martival
Catholic Church titles
Preceded by Nicholas Longespee	Bishop of Salisbury; 1297–1315	Succeeded by Roger Martival
