= William Longespée, 3rd Earl of Salisbury =

11/12th-century Anglo-French nobleman and illegitimate son of King Henry II

William Longespée
- Earl of Salisbury
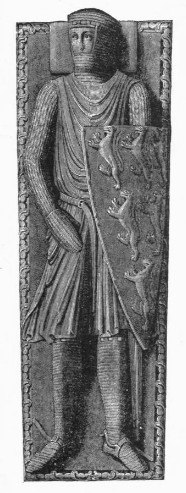
- Drawing of effigy of William Longespée from his monument in Salisbury Cathedral
- Born: c. 1167
- Died: 7 March 1226 (aged 58–59); Salisbury Castle, Salisbury, Wiltshire, England
- Noble family: Plantagenet
- Spouse: Ela, Countess of Salisbury
- Issue among others...: William II Longespée; Nicholas Longespée
- Father: Henry II of England
- Mother: Ida de Tosny

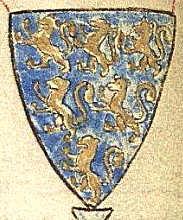
Arms of Longespée, as drawn by Matthew Paris (d. 1259): Azure, six lions rampant or, 3,2,1. As seen sculpted on the shield of his effigy in Salisbury Cathedral

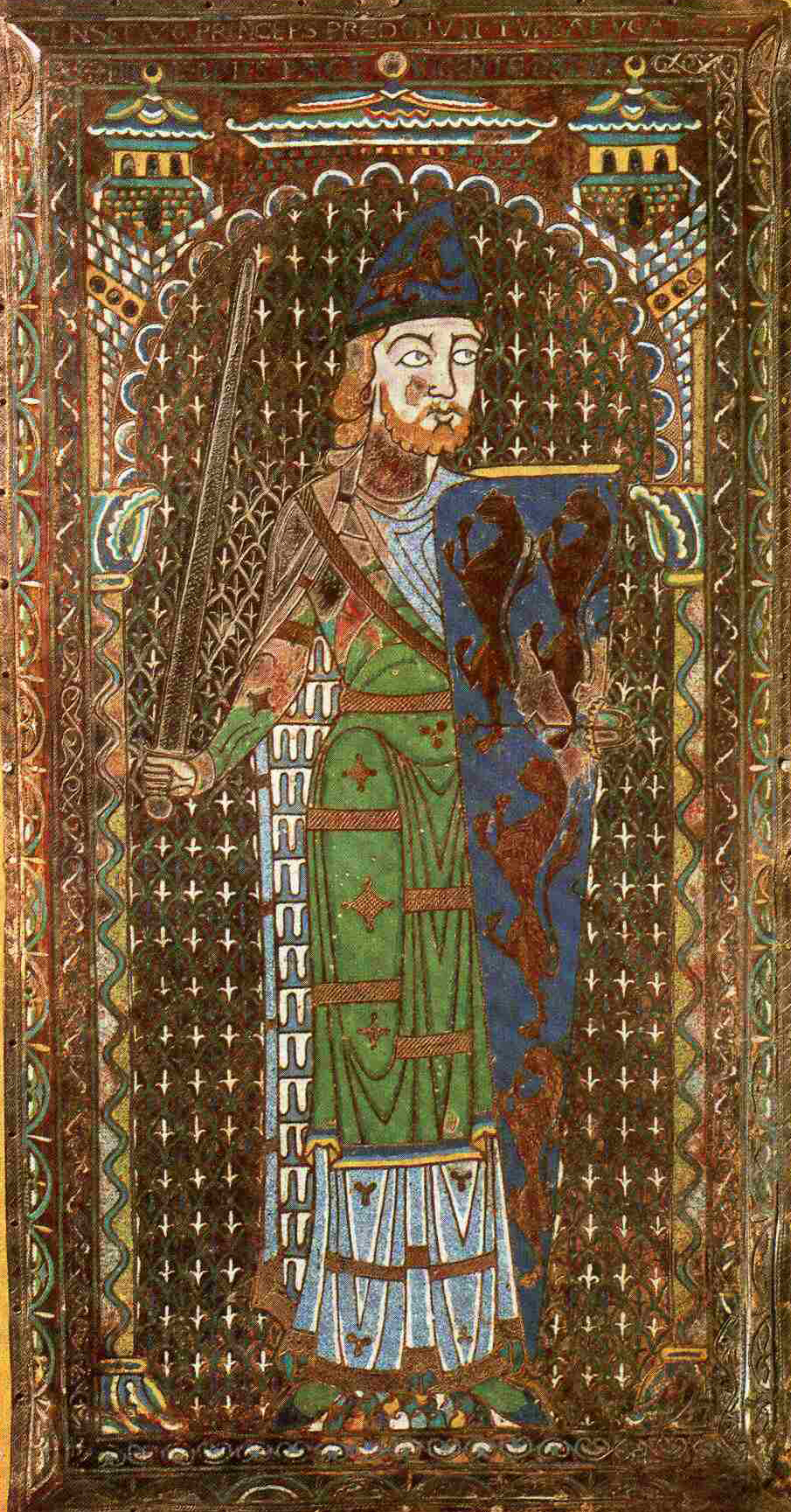
Geoffrey Plantagenet, Count of Anjou, paternal grandfather of William Longespée, displaying on his shield proto-heraldic arms of Azure, six lions rampant or, 3,2,1, the same arms shown on Longespée's shield in Salisbury Cathedral. Enamel from his tomb in Le Mans Cathedral

William Longespée, 3rd Earl of Salisbury (In or before 1167 – 7 March 1226) ("Long Sword", Latinised to de Longa Spatha) was an Anglo-Norman nobleman, primarily remembered for his command of the English forces at the Battle of Damme and for remaining loyal to his half-brother, King John, until shortly before John's death. His nickname "Longespée" is generally taken as a reference to his great physical height and the oversized weapons that he used.

== Early life ==
William was an illegitimate son of Henry II, King of England. His mother was unknown for many years until the discovery of a charter William made that mentions "Comitissa Ida, mater mea" (Countess Ida, my mother). This referred to Ida de Tosny, a member of the prominent Tosny (or Toesny) family, who had married Roger Bigod, 2nd Earl of Norfolk in 1181.

In 1188, William was recognised as son of King Henry II and received the honour of Appleby, Lincolnshire. Eight years later, his half brother King Richard I married him to a great heiress, Ela of Salisbury, 3rd Countess of Salisbury, the only child of William of Salisbury, 2nd Earl of Salisbury. Accordingly, William was given the title and lands of the earldom of Salisbury.

During the reign of King John, William was at court on several important ceremonial occasions and held various offices: High Sheriff of Wiltshire; lieutenant of Gascony; constable of Dover; and Lord Warden of the Cinque Ports; and later warden of the Welsh Marches. He was appointed sheriff of Cambridgeshire and Huntingdonshire about 1213.

== Military career ==
Charter witness lists place William in Normandy during Richard I's campaigns to recover lands seized by King Philip II whilst King Richard had been away on crusade. In 1205, William was sent to Poitou to command a small force of knights alongside John's bastard son, Geoffrey, after John's plans for a full scale expedition were squashed. Salisbury was a commander in the king's Welsh and Irish expeditions of 1210–1212 and was appointed Viceroy of Ireland, jointly with John de Gray, Bishop of Norwich, when the king left for England in 1210. The king also granted him the Honour of Eye in Suffolk.

In 1213, Salisbury led a large fleet to Flanders, where he seized or destroyed a good part of a French invasion fleet anchored at or near Damme. This ended the invasion threat but not the conflicts between England and France. In 1214, Salisbury was sent to help Otto IV of Germany, an English ally, who was invading France. Salisbury commanded the right wing of the army at their disastrous defeat in that year at the Battle of Bouvines, where he was captured after the Bishop of Beauvais, Philip of Dreux, struck him with a mace.

By the time he returned to England, revolt was brewing amongst the barons. Salisbury was one of the few who remained loyal to John. In the civil war that took place the year after the signing of the Magna Carta, Salisbury was one of the leaders of the king's army in the south. He was made High Sheriff of Wiltshire again, this time for life. However, after Louis of France landed as an ally of the rebels, Salisbury went over to his side. Presumably, he thought John's cause was lost.

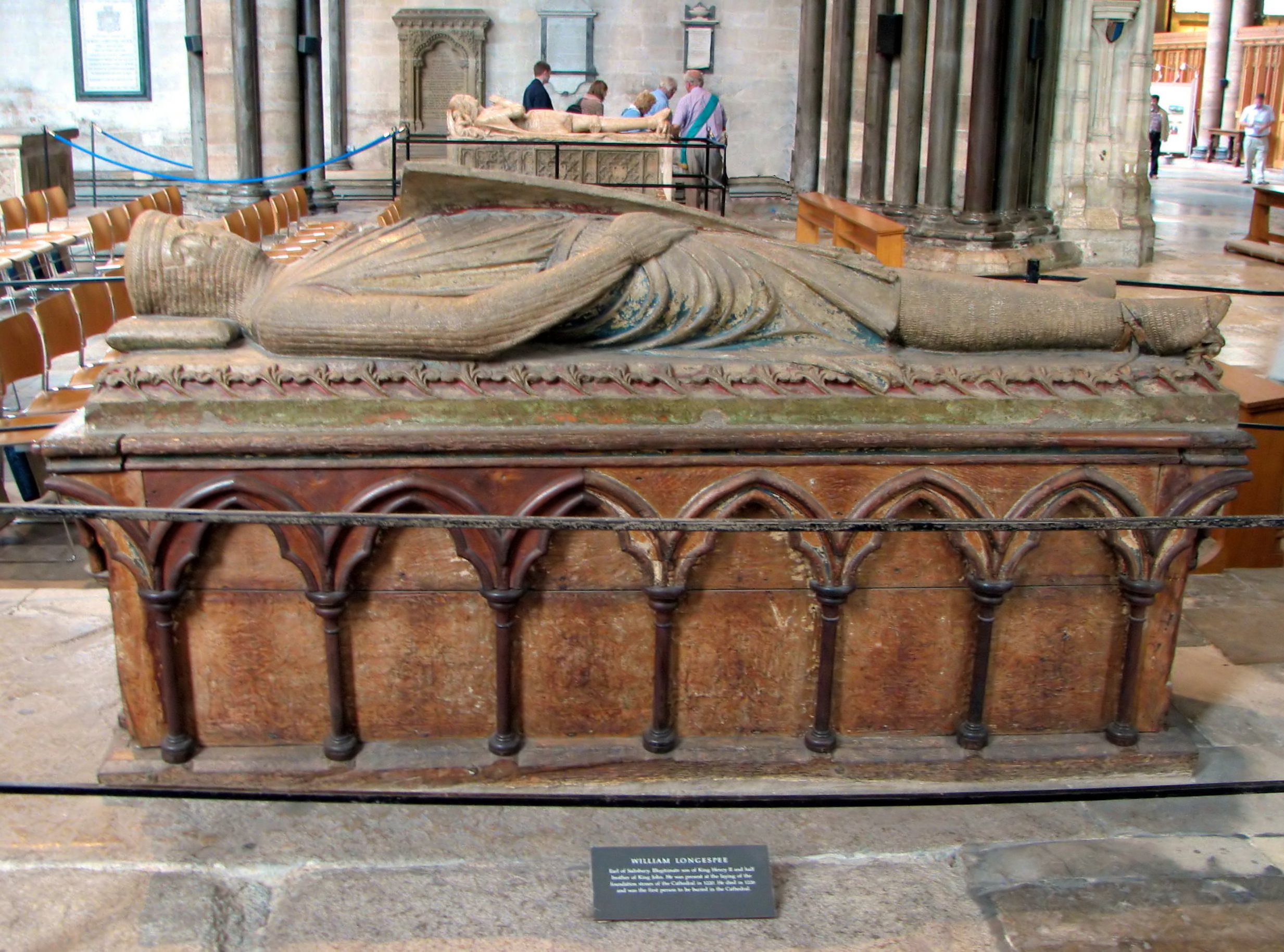
Tomb of William Longespée in Salisbury Cathedral

After John's death and the departure of Louis, Salisbury, along with many other barons, joined the cause of John's young son, now Henry III of England. After raising the siege of Lincoln with William Marshall and fighting at Sandwich, he was also appointed High Sheriff of Lincolnshire (in addition to his current post as High Sheriff of Somerset) and governor of Lincoln castle. He held an influential place in the government during the king's minority and fought in Gascony to help secure the remaining part of the English continental possessions. He was appointed High Sheriff of Devon in 1217 and High Sheriff of Staffordshire and Shropshire in 1224. Salisbury's ship was nearly lost in a storm while returning to England in 1225, and he spent some months in refuge at a monastery on the French island of Ré.

== Death ==
Salisbury died not long after his return to England at Salisbury Castle. A story related by Matthew Paris that he was poisoned by Hubert de Burgh is described by the historian Matthew Strickland as "undoubtedly false". He was buried in Salisbury Cathedral.

The corpse of a rat was found in Salisbury's tomb when it was opened in 1791.

== Likeness ==
A terracotta statue of Salisbury, dating from 1756, is located in the Great Hall of Lacock Abbey in Lacock, Wiltshire, England. A likeness of his wife Ela is also on display, while several other statues are believed to show their children.

== Cultural legacy ==
The 1762 novel Longsword by Irish writer Thomas Leland was based on his life, which itself inspired the 1767 play The Countess of Salisbury by Hartson Hall that premiered at the Haymarket Theatre in London.

== Family ==
William and Ela, Countess of Salisbury had:

- William II Longespée (1212?–1250), who was sometimes called Earl of Salisbury but never legally bore the title because he died before his mother, Countess Ela, who held the earldom until her death in 1261. He married Idoine de Camville.
- Stephen Longespée (died 1260), who was seneschal of Gascony and Justiciar of Ireland, married Emeline de Ridelsford, widow of Hugh de Lacy, 1st Earl of Ulster.
- Richard Longespée, a canon of Salisbury.
- Nicholas Longespée (died 1297), bishop of Salisbury
- Isabel Longespée, who married Sir William de Vesci.
- Ela Longespée, who first married Thomas de Beaumont, 6th Earl of Warwick, and then married Philip Basset. No issue.
- Ida Longespée, married firstly Ralph de Somery of Dudley. They had no children. She married secondly William de Beauchamp, Baron of Bedford, by whom she had seven children.
- Mary Longespée, married.
- Pernel Longespée.

Peerage of England
Preceded by William	Earl of Salisbury; 1196–1226; With: Ela	Succeeded by Ela

== Sources ==
- Bennett, Stephen (2013). "Philippe de Dreux, Bishop of Beauvais: "A man more devoted to battles than books"". Medieval Warfare. 3 (2): 26–32.
- Blumberg, Arnold (2011). "Fleets of king John: The royal English navy during the War of Bouvines". Medieval Warfare. 1 (1: The War of Bouvines: Rise of France): 19–23.
- Bradbury, Jim (1998). Philip Augustus. Taylor & Francis.
- Carpenter, David (1990). The Minority of Henry III. University of California Press.
- Gee, Loveday Lewes (2002). Women, Art and Patronage from Henry III to Edward III: 1216-1377. Boydell Press.
- Lloyd, Simon (1991). "William Longespee II: The Making of an English Crusading Hero (Part I)". Nottingham Medieval Studies. 35: 41–69. doi:10.1484/J.NMS.3.191.
- Malden, A.R. (1900). "The Will of Nicholas Longespee, Bishop of Salisbury". The English Historical Review. 15 (59 (Jul.)): 523–528.
- Pollock, M.A. (2015). Scotland, England and France after the Loss of Normandy, 1204-1296: 'Auld Amitie'. The Boydell Press.
