= Lacock Abbey =

House in Wiltshire, England

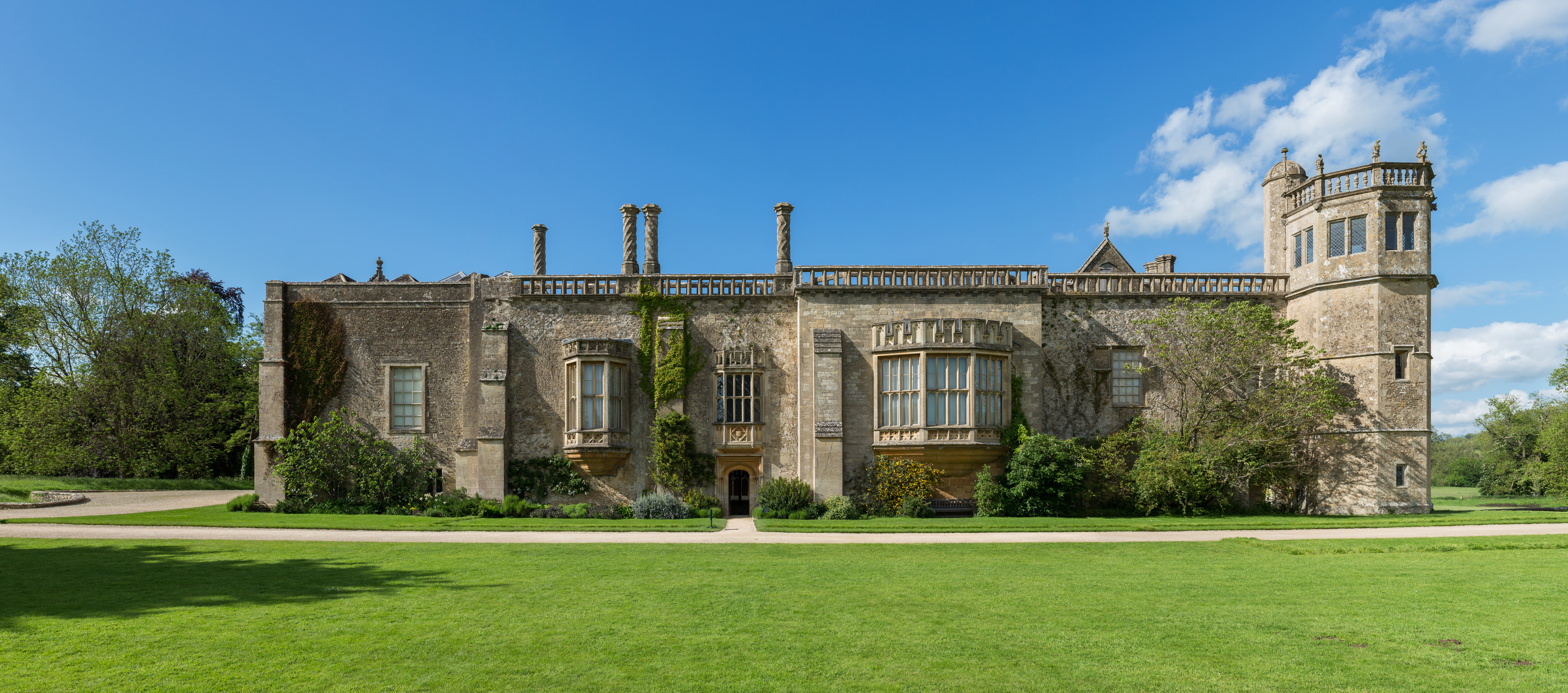
- Lacock Abbey from the south, including the window famously photographed by William Henry Fox Talbot

- Location within Wiltshire
- 51°24′53″N 2°07′02″W
- Location: Lacock
- OS grid reference: ST9193268418

History
- Built: 13th century
- Rebuilt: 16th–19th centuries

Site notes
- Area: Wiltshire
- Owner: National Trust

Listed Building – Grade I
- Official name: Lacock Abbey with stable yard
- Designated: 20 December 1960
- Reference no.: 1283853

Lacock Abbey is a country house in the village of Lacock, Wiltshire, England. There was an abbey of nuns on the site until 1539, and the house is a remodelling and extension of the abbey's cloister court. The Grade I listed building is owned by the National Trust and is notable as the site of Henry Fox Talbot's pioneering work in photography in the 1830s.

The religious institution was founded in the early 13th century by Ela, Countess of Salisbury, as a nunnery of the Augustinian order. The abbey remained a nunnery until the dissolution of the monasteries in the 16th century; the property was then sold to Sir William Sharington who converted the convent into a residence where he and his family lived. It was fortified and remained loyal to the crown during the English Civil War, but surrendered to the Parliamentary forces once Devizes had fallen in 1645.

The house was built over the old cloisters and its main rooms are on the first floor. It is a stone house with stone slated roofs, twisted chimney stacks and mullioned windows. Throughout the life of the building, many architectural alterations, additions, and renovations have occurred so that the house is a mish-mash of periods and styles. The Tudor stable courtyard to the north of the house has retained many of its original features including a brewhouse and bakehouse.

The house later passed into the hands of the Talbot family, and in 1835 Henry Fox Talbot made what may be the earliest surviving photographic camera negative, an image of one of the windows. In 1944, Matilda Theresa Talbot gave the house and the surrounding village of Lacock to the National Trust. The abbey houses the Fox Talbot Museum.

== History ==
Lacock Abbey, dedicated to St Mary and St Bernard, was founded in 1232 by Ela, Countess of Salisbury, widow of William Longespee, an illegitimate son of Henry II. Ela laid the abbey's first stone in Snail's Meadow, near the village of Lacock on 16 April 1232. The first of the Augustinian nuns were veiled in 1232, and Ela joined the community in 1238.

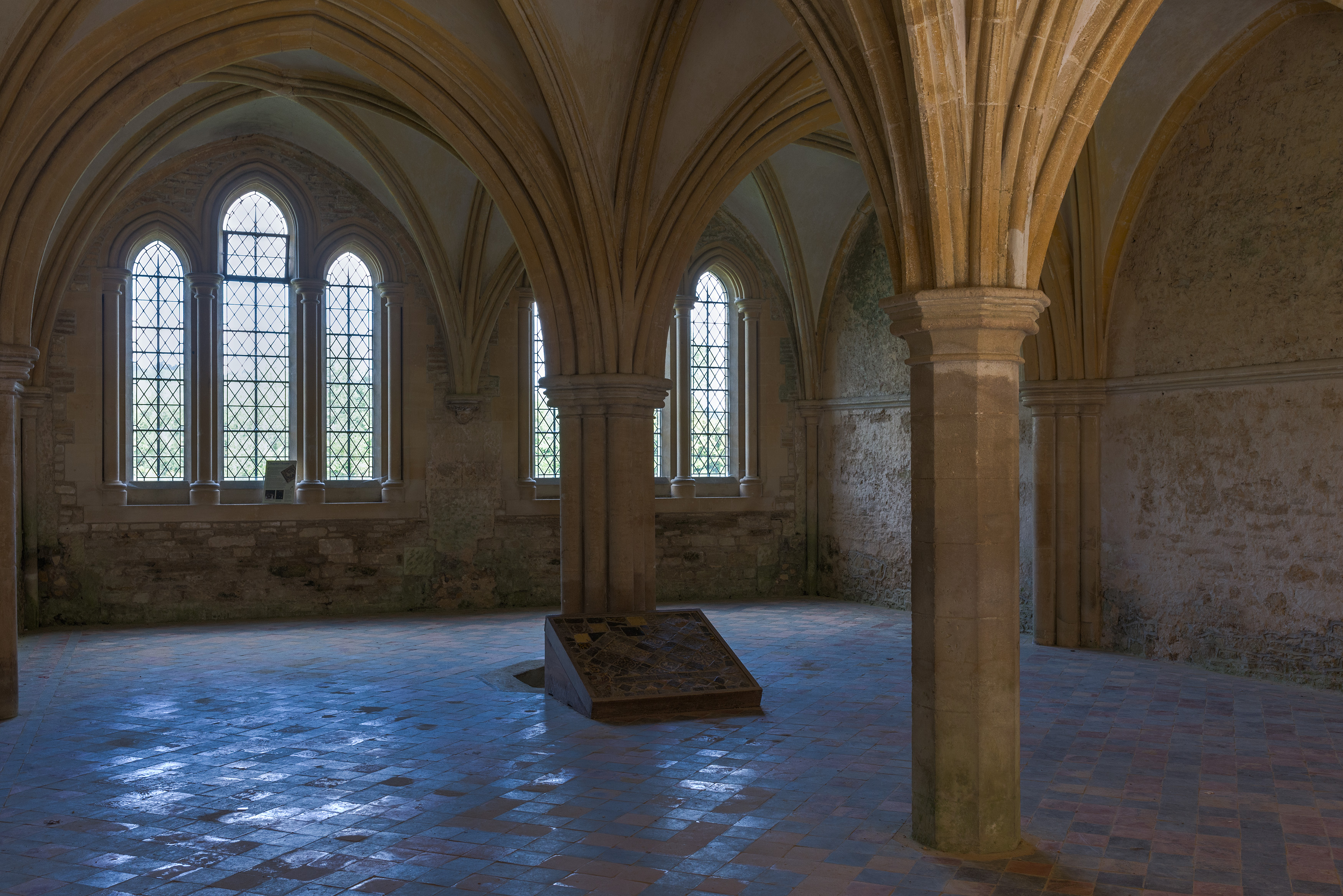
The chapter house survives unaltered.

Lacock Abbey prospered throughout the Middle Ages. The rich farmlands which it had received from Ela ensured it a sizeable income from wool.

Following the dissolution of the monasteries in the mid-16th century, Henry VIII sold the abbey to Sir William Sharington for £783. He demolished the abbey church, using the stone to extend the building, and converted the abbey into a house, starting work in about 1539. So as not to be disturbed by villagers passing close to his residence, he is said to have sold the church bells and used the proceeds to erect a bridge over the River Ray for their convenience. Few other alterations were made to the monastic buildings themselves: the cloisters, for example, still stand below the living accommodation. About 1550, Sir William added an octagonal tower containing two small chambers, one above the other; the lower one was reached through the main rooms, and was for storing and viewing his treasures; the upper one, for banqueting, was only accessible by walking across the leads of the roof. In each chamber is a central octagonal stone table, carved with up-to-date Renaissance ornament. A mid-16th century stone conduit house stands over the spring from which water was conducted to the house. Further additions were made over the centuries, and the house now has various grand reception rooms.

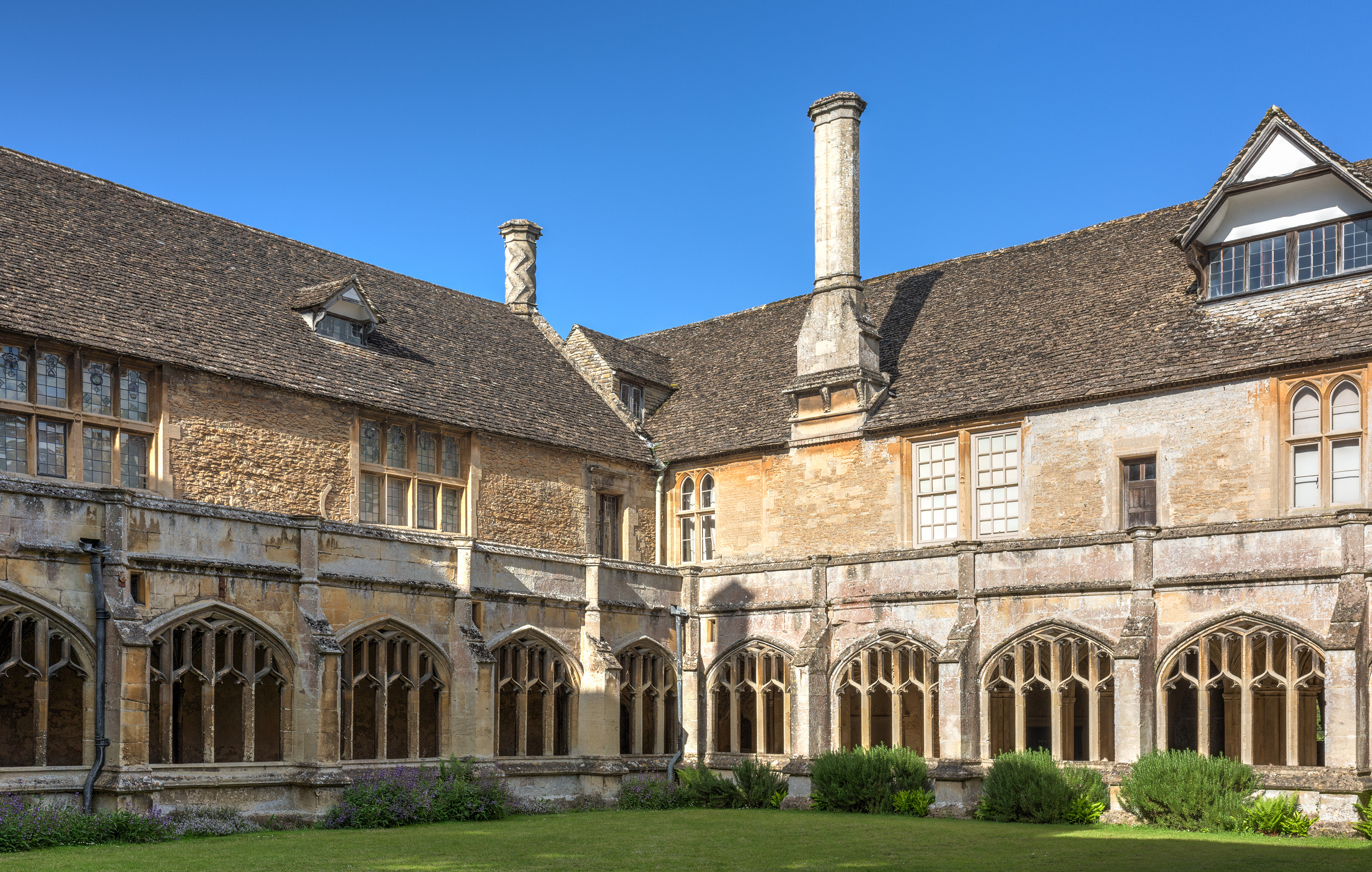
The internal courtyard of the cloisters

In the 16th and early 17th centuries, Nicholas Cooper has pointed out, bedchambers were often named for individuals who customarily inhabited them when staying at a house. At Lacock, as elsewhere, they were named for individuals "whose recognition in this way advertised the family's affinities": the best chamber was "the duke's chamber", probably signifying John Dudley, 1st Duke of Northumberland, whom Sharington had served, while "Lady Thynne's chamber", identified it with the wife of Sir John Thynne of Longleat, and "Mr Mildmay's chamber" was reserved for Sharington's son-in-law Anthony Mildmay of Apethorpe in Northamptonshire.

Anne of Denmark came to Lacock in May 1613 during her progress to Bath. She was in pain from gout, and her physician Théodore de Mayerne examined her and made prescriptions. During the English Civil War the house was garrisoned by Royalists. It was fortified by surrounding it with earthworks. The garrison surrendered (on agreed terms) to Parliamentarian forces under the command of Colonel Devereux, Governor of Malmesbury, within days of Oliver Cromwell's capture of the nearby town of Devizes in late September 1645.

The house eventually passed to the Talbot family. It is most often associated with amateur scientist and inventor William Henry Fox Talbot, who in 1835 made what may be the earliest surviving photographic camera negative: an interior view of the oriel window in the south gallery of the abbey. Talbot's experiments eventually led to his invention of the more sensitive and practical calotype or "Talbotype" paper negative process for camera use, commercially introduced in 1841.

== Architecture ==
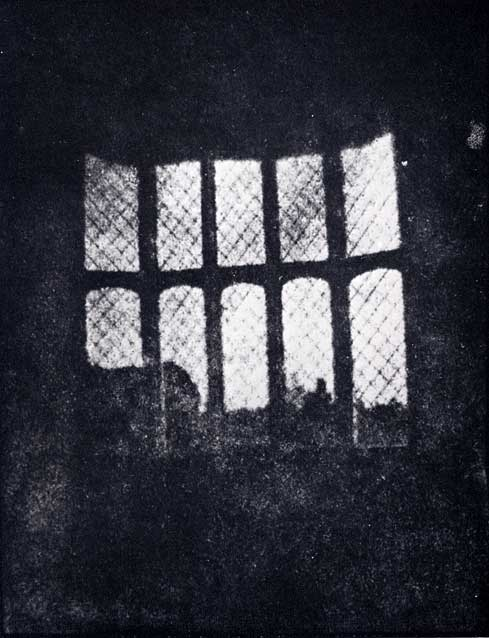
A latticed window in Lacock Abbey, photographed by William Fox Talbot in 1835. Shown here in positive form, this may be the oldest extant photographic negative made in a camera.

When Sir William Sharington purchased the remains of the Augustinian nunnery in 1540, after the dissolution, he built a country house on the cloister court. He retained the cloisters and the medieval basement largely unaltered and built another storey above, so that the main rooms are on the first floor. The house is constructed of ashlar and rubble stone, the roofs are of stone slates and there are many twisted, sixteenth century chimney stacks. The house is a blend of different styles but lacks a cohesive plan; the four wings of the house are built above the cloister passages, but the house cannot be entered from the cloisters, and the cloisters cannot be seen from inside the house. The abbey underwent substantial alterations in the Gothic Revival style in the 1750s, under the ownership of John Ivory Talbot. The great hall was redesigned during this period by Sanderson Miller.

The basement consists of an arcade of cloisters on three sides, surrounding several vaulted rooms including the sacristy, chapter house, and warming house. These rooms were situated under the original dormitory. At the other end of the building, below what was formerly the abbess' chambers and the great hall, are two rooms and the main passage. On the north side, underneath the original refectory, is the undercroft.

The west front has two flights of broad, balustraded steps leading up to the central door. Inside is a full-height hall with a part-hipped valley roof. On either side of this are octagonal turrets with cupolas and delicately pierced parapets. To the left of the hall is the former medieval kitchen with a balustraded parapet and buttresses. To the right is a range of parapetted rooms with a stepped buttress at the corner. The south front was plain, being the inside north wall of the original abbey church which was pulled down, but was rebuilt by William Talbot in 1828 to include bay windows. At this end of the building is Sharington's tower, an octagonal, three-storey tower, topped with a belvedere, balustrade, and stair turret.

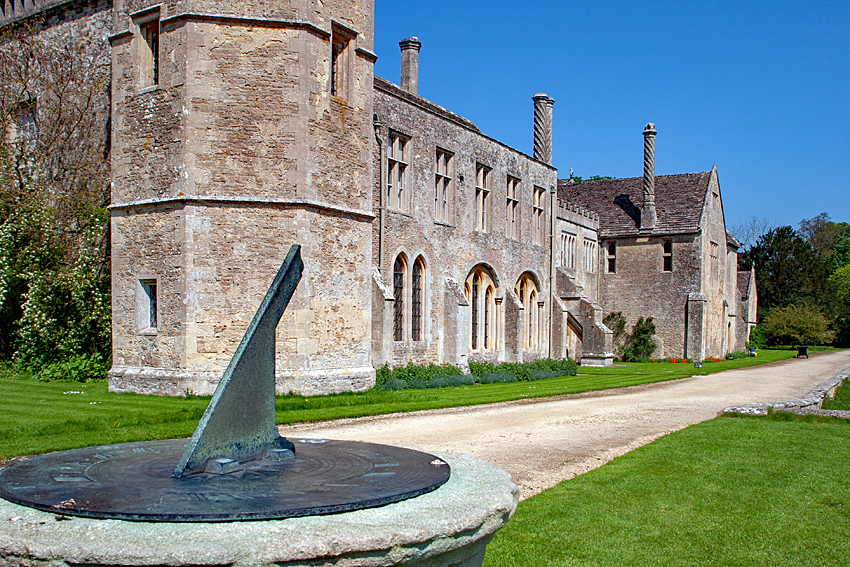
The east front of Lacock Abbey

The east front looks more medieval than the other sides but probably dates from about 1900, however the south end cross-wing appears to be mostly sixteenth century. To the north of the house stands the well-preserved sixteenth century stable courtyard. This has timbered gabled dormer windows and a tall clock-tower at the west side of its north range. These buildings have mullion windows, and Tudor arched-doorways. Also beside the courtyard are the brewhouse, dating from the 16th century and one of the oldest in Britain, and the bakehouse. The two lodges are seventeenth century and the carriage-houses are eighteenth century.

== Today ==
Lacock Abbey is the property of the National Trust, to which it was given in 1944 by Matilda Gilchrist-Clark, who had inherited the estate from her uncle Charles Henry Fox Talbot in 1916. The house, together with the stable yard, is Grade I listed.

The Fox Talbot Museum forms part of the ground floor. It celebrates the life of William Henry Fox Talbot, and his contributions to photography, and includes exhibits on the man himself, his mousetrap camera (so-called by his wife because he scattered the little wooden boxes round the house), the chemical processes involved in obtaining images and the early history of photography. Exhibitions showing the works of various photographers are sometimes held in a gallery on the first floor. The Fenton Collection, an historic photographic collection, was transferred to the museum from the British Film Institute in 2017.

== In film and television ==
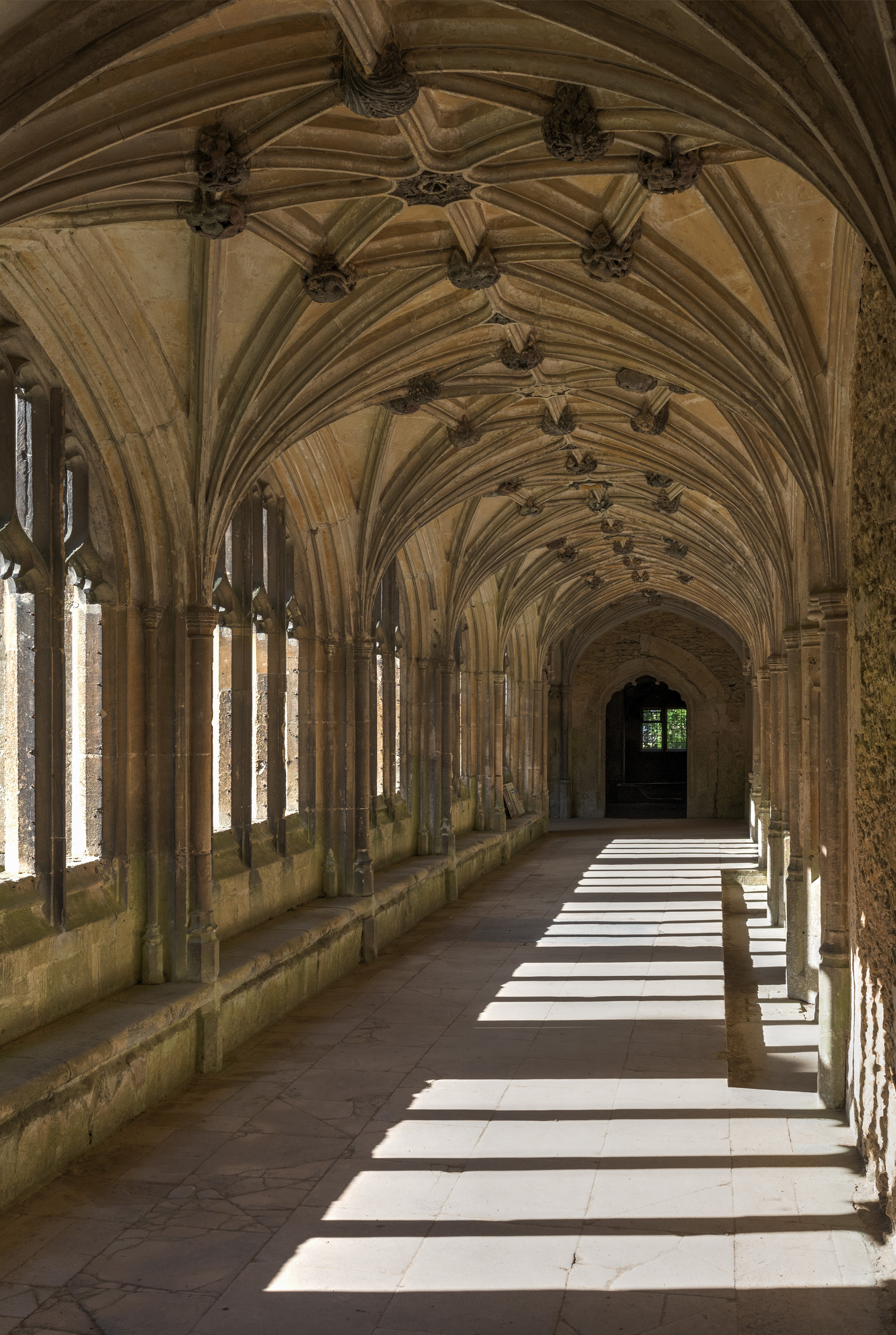
The cloisters of Lacock Abbey

Some interior sequences in Harry Potter and the Philosopher's Stone (2001) and Harry Potter and the Chamber of Secrets (2002) were filmed at Lacock, including the cloister walk where Harry discovers the Mirror of Erised and when he comes out from Professor Lockhart's room after serving detention and hears the basilisk. Scenes from Harry Potter and the Half-Blood Prince (2009) and Fantastic Beasts: The Crimes of Grindelwald (2018) were also shot here.

The abbey was one of two major locations for the 2008 film version of the historical novel The Other Boleyn Girl by Philippa Gregory, directed by Justin Chadwick. Parts of the 2010 American horror film The Wolfman, starring Anthony Hopkins and directed by Joe Johnston, were shot at the abbey. The interior of the abbey was used in the 1995 BBC/A&E production of Jane Austen's Pride and Prejudice and the BBC adaptation of Daniel Defoe's Moll Flanders, and scenes for the BBC's historical TV serial Wolf Hall, by Hilary Mantel, were filmed here in 2014.
