= List of nobles and magnates of England in the 13th century =

During the 13th century (1201 - 1300) England was partially ruled by Archbishops, Bishops, Earls (Counts), Barons, marcher Lords, and knights. All of these except for the knights would always hold most of their fiefs as tenant in chief. Although the kings maintained control of huge tracts of lands through judges, constables, castles, and sheriffs, the nobles of England were still powerful. This is a list of the various different nobles and magnates including both lords spiritual and lords secular. It also includes nobles who were vassals of the king but were not based in England (Welsh, Irish, French). Additionally nobles of lesser rank who appear to have been prominent in England at the time. The nobles are listed categorically by rank starting with the Archbishops and going down to the nobles who did not hold titles.

== Archbishops ==
The word Archbishop originates as an additional honor for powerful bishops who held sway over several dioceses. Archbishops were usually associated with an important city holding land and influence within the city

Note: Several Archbishops are not listed because they were either not consecrated, set aside within 3 years, did not rule for more than a year, or were quashed by the pope/the king.

#	Title	Coats of Arms	1st	2nd	3rd	4th	5th	6th	7th	8th
1	Archbishop of Canterbury		Hubert Walter(1193–1205)	Stephen Langton (1207–1228)	Richard le Grant (1229–1231)	Edmund of Abingdon (1234–1240)	Boniface of Savoy (bishop) (1241–1270)	Robert Kilwardby (1273–1278)	John Peckham (1279–1292)	Robert Winchelsey (1294–1313)
2	Archbishop of York		Geoffrey (archbishop of York) (1191–1212)	Walter de Gray (1216–1255)	Sewal de Bovil (1256–1258)	Godfrey Ludham (1258–1265)	Walter Giffard (1266–1279)	William de Wickwane (1279–1285)	John le Romeyn (1286–1296)	Henry of Newark (1298–1299)
3	Archbishop of Dublin		John Comyn (bishop) (1181–1212)	Henry de Loundres (1213–1228)	Luke (Archbishop of Dublin) (1230–1255)	Fulk Basset (1256–1271)	John de Derlington (1279–1284)	John de Sandford (1286–1294)	William Houghton (bishop) (1296–1298)	Richard de Ferings (1299–1306)
4	Archbishop of Bordeaux		Hélie de Malemort (1188–1207)	Guillaume II Amanieu de Genève (1207–1227)	Géraud de Malemort (1227–1261)	Pierre de Roncevault (1261–1270)	Simon de Rochechouart (1275–1280)	Guillaume III (archbishop of Bordeaux) (1285–1287)	Henri de Genève (1289–1297)	Boson de Salignac (1297–1299)

== Earls/Counts ==
Earls (referred to as Comitis in records) were powerful lords holding their lands per baronium. Technically they were the kings highest representative in their given shires (outranking even the sheriff who were referred to as vicecomitem (Vice-Counts)), for example the Earl of Devon would be the highest administrator of Devonshire, however he was not the overlord of the barons in Devonshire (though he could be for certain manors but the baron could just as well be the overlord of a different manor which the earl possessed).

#	Title	Region	Coats of Arms	1st	2nd	3rd	4th	5th	6th	7th	8th
1	Earls Palatine of Chester	Wales		Ranulf de Blondeville, 6th Earl of Chester (1181–1232)	John of Scotland, Earl of Huntingdon (1232–1237)	Edward I of England (1254–1264)	Simon de Montfort, 6th Earl of Leicester (1264–1265)	Alphonso, Earl of Chester (1273–1284)			
2	Earls Palatine of Lancaster	North-West		Edmund Crouchback (1245–1296)							
3	Earls of Devon	South-West		William de Redvers, 5th Earl of Devon (1193–1217)	Baldwin de Redvers, 6th Earl of Devon (1217–1245)	Baldwin de Redvers, 7th Earl of Devon (1245–1262)	Isabel de Forz, suo jure 8th Countess of Devon (1262–1293)				
4	Earls of Warwick	West Midlands		Henry de Beaumont, 5th Earl of Warwick (1204–1229)	Thomas de Beaumont, 6th Earl of Warwick (1208–1242)	Margaret de Beaumont, 7th Countess of Warwick (1242–1253)	William Mauduit, 8th Earl of Warwick (1221–1268)	William de Beauchamp, 9th Earl of Warwick (1238–1298)	Guy de Beauchamp, 10th Earl of Warwick (1298–1315)		
5	Earls of Kent	South-East		Hubert de Burgh, 1st Earl of Kent (1227–1243)							
6	Earls of Hereford	West Midlands		Henry de Bohun, 1st Earl of Hereford (1119–1220)	Humphrey de Bohun, 2nd Earl of Hereford (1220–1275)	Humphrey de Bohun, 3rd Earl of Hereford (1275–1297)	Humphrey de Bohun, 4th Earl of Hereford (1298–1322)				
7	Counts of Armagnac (de jure)	Gascony		Gerald IV Trancaleon (1188–1215)	Gerald V of Armagnac (1215–1219)	Pierre-Gerald, Count of Armagnac (1219–1241)	Bernard V, Count of Armagnac (1241–1245)	Arnauld II (1245–1249)	Mascarose II (1249–1256)	Gerald VI, Count of Armagnac (1256–1285)	Bernard VI, Count of Armagnac (1285–1319)
8	Counts of Bigorre	Gascony		Petronilla, Countess of Bigorre (1194–1251)	Eskivat de Chabanais (1255–1283)	Laura, Countess of Bigorre (1283–1302)					
9	Counts of Astarac	Gascony		Centule I of Astarac (1174–1233)	Bernard IV of Astarac (1249–1291)						
10	Counts of Comminges	Gascony		Bernard IV, Count of Comminges (1176–1225)	Bernard V, Count of Comminges (1225–1241)	Bernard VI, Count of Comminges (1241–1295)	Bernard VII, Count of Comminges (1295–1312)				
11	Counts of Aumale	Gascony (De jure)		William de Forz, 3rd Earl of Albemarle (1215–1242)	William de Forz, 4th Earl of Albemarle (1242–1260)	Thomas de Forz, 5th Earl of Albemarle (1260–1269)	Aveline de Forz, Countess of Albemarle (1269–1274)				
12	Earls of Huntingdon	East		John of Scotland, Earl of Huntingdon (1219–1237)							
13	Earls of Norfolk	East		Hugh Bigod, 3rd Earl of Norfolk (1189–1225)	Roger Bigod, 4th Earl of Norfolk (1209–1270)	Roger Bigod, 5th Earl of Norfolk (1270–1306)					
14	Earls of Cornwall	South-West		Richard of Cornwall (1225–1272)	Edmund, 2nd Earl of Cornwall (1272–1300)						
15	Earls of Surrey	South-East		William de Warenne, 5th Earl of Surrey (1202–1240)	John de Warenne, 6th Earl of Surrey (1251–1304)						
16	Earls of Leicester	East Midlands		Simon de Montfort, 6th Earl of Leicester (1239–1265)	Edmund Crouchback (1265–1296)						
17	Earls of Richmond	Yorkshire									
18	Earls of Gloucester	West Midlands		Gilbert de Clare, 5th Earl of Gloucester (1225–1230)	Richard de Clare, 6th Earl of Gloucester (1230–1262)	Gilbert de Clare, 7th Earl of Gloucester (1262–1295)	Gilbert de Clare, 8th Earl of Gloucester (1295–1314)				
19	Earls of Derby	East Midlands		William de Ferrers, 4th Earl of Derby (1190–1247)	William de Ferrers, 5th Earl of Derby (1247–1254)	Robert de Ferrers, 6th Earl of Derby (1239–1279)					
20	Marcher-Earls of Pembroke	Wales		William Marshal, 1st Earl of Pembroke (1199–1219)	William Marshal, 2nd Earl of Pembroke (1219–1231)	Richard Marshal, 3rd Earl of Pembroke (1231–1234)	Gilbert Marshal, 4th Earl of Pembroke (1234–1241)	Walter Marshal, 5th Earl of Pembroke (1242–1245)			
21	Earls of Hertford	East		Gilbert de Clare, 5th Earl of Gloucester (1217–1230)	Richard de Clare, 6th Earl of Gloucester (1230–1262)	Gilbert de Clare, 7th Earl of Gloucester (1262–1295)	Gilbert de Clare, 8th Earl of Gloucester (1295–1314)				
22	Earls of Arundel	South-East		William d'Aubigny, 3rd Earl of Arundel (1193–1221)	William d'Aubigny, 4th Earl of Arundel (1221–1224)	Hugh d'Aubigny, 5th Earl of Arundel (1224–1243)					
23	Earls of Essex	East		Geoffrey Fitz Peter, 1st Earl of Essex (1199–1213)	Geoffrey FitzGeoffrey de Mandeville, 2nd Earl of Essex (1213–1216)	William FitzGeoffrey de Mandeville, 3rd Earl of Essex (1216–1227)	Humphrey de Bohun, 2nd Earl of Hereford (1239–1275)	Humphrey de Bohun, 3rd Earl of Hereford (1275–1297)	Humphrey de Bohun, 4th Earl of Hereford (1298–1322)		
24	Earls of Oxford (Master Chamberlain)	South-East		Aubrey de Vere, 2nd Earl of Oxford (1194–1214)	Robert de Vere, 3rd Earl of Oxford (1214–1221)	Hugh de Vere, 4th Earl of Oxford (1221–1263)	Robert de Vere, 5th Earl of Oxford (1263–1265, 1267–1296)	Robert de Vere, 6th Earl of Oxford (1296–1331)			
25	Earls of Lincoln	East Midlands		Ranulf de Blondeville, 6th Earl of Chester (1217–1231)	John de Lacy, 2nd Earl of Lincoln (1232–1240)	Margaret de Quincy, Countess of Lincoln (1232–1266)	Henry de Lacy, 3rd Earl of Lincoln (1272–1311)				
26	Earls of Winchester	South-East		Saer de Quincy, 1st Earl of Winchester (1207–1219)	Roger de Quincy, 2nd Earl of Winchester (1219–1264)						
27	Earls of Ulster	Ireland		Hugh de Lacy, 1st Earl of Ulster (1205–1243)	Walter de Burgh, 1st Earl of Ulster (1264–1271)	Richard Óg de Burgh, 2nd Earl of Ulster (1271–1326)					

== Lords Spiritual ==
The lords spiritual were bishops, abbots, and other leading clergymen who functioned similarly to feudal barons holding their land per baronium. Generally they were centered at a cathedral or abbey and not a castle and although some were expected to provide soldiers for the king, they were not expected to fight themselves (however some of them did). Bishops who ruled for less than three years will not be listed to avoid clutter.

#	Title	Region	County/Shire	Coats of arms	1st	2nd	3rd	4th	5th	6th	7th	8th	9th
1	Bishops-Palatine of Durham	North-East	Durhamshire		Philip of Poitou (1197–1208)	Richard Poore (1209–1213, 1229–1237)	Richard Marsh (bishop) (1217–1226)	Nicholas Farnham (1241–1249)	Walter of Kirkham (1249–1260)	Robert Stitchill (1260–1274)	Robert of Holy Island (1274–1283)	Antony Bek (bishop of Durham) (1284–1310)	
2	Bishops of London	South-East	Middlesex		William of Sainte-Mère-Église (1198–1221)	Eustace of Fauconberg (1221–1228)	Roger Niger (1228–1241)	Fulk Basset (bishop of London) (1241–1259)	Henry of Sandwich (1262–1272)	John Chishull (1273–1280)	Richard Gravesend (1280–1303)		
3	Bishops of Winchester	South-East	Hampshire		Godfrey de Luci (1189–1204)	Peter des Roches (1205–1238)	William de Raley (1240–1250)	Aymer de Valence (bishop) (1250–1260)	John Gervais (1262–1268)	Nicholas of Ely (1268–1282)	John of Pontoise (1282–1304)		
4	Bishops of Norwich	East	Norfolk		John de Gray (1200–1214)	Pandulf Verraccio (1215–1226)	Thomas Blunville (1226–1236)	William de Raley (1239–1243)	Walter Suffield (1245–1257)	Simon Walton (bishop) (1258–1266)	Roger Skerning (1266–1278)	William Middleton (bishop) (1278–1288)	Ralph Walpole (1289–1299)
5	Bishops of Carlisle	North-West	Yorkshire		Bernard (bishop of Carlisle) (1203–1214)	Hugh of Beaulieu (1214–1223)	Walter Mauclerk (1223–1246)	Silvester de Everdon (1246–1254)	Robert de Chauncy (1257–1278)	Ralph of Irton (1278–1292)	John de Halton (1292–1324)		
6	Bishops of Ely	East	Cambridgeshire		Eustace (bishop of Ely) (1198–1215)	John of Fountains (1220–1225)	Hugh of Northwold (1229–1254)	Hugh de Balsham (1258–1286)	John Kirkby (bishop of Ely) (1286–1290)	William of Louth (1290–1298)			
7	Bishops of Bath	South-West	Somerset		Savaric FitzGeldewin (1192–1206)	Jocelin of Wells (1206–1242)	Roger of Salisbury (bishop of Bath and Wells) (1244–1247)	William of Bitton (1248–1264)	William of Bitton (nephew) (1267–1274)	Robert Burnell (1275–1292)	William of March (1293–1302)		
8	Bishops of Salisbury	South-West	Wiltshire		Herbert Poore (1194–1217)	Richard Poore (1217–1228)	Robert de Bingham (1229–1246)	William de York (1246–1256)	Giles of Bridport (1256–1262)	Walter de la Wyle (1263–1271)	Robert Wickhampton (1271–1284)	Nicholas Longespee (1291–1297)	Simon of Ghent (1297–1315)
9	Bishops of Chichester	South-East	Sussex		Seffrid II (1180–1204)	Nicholas de Aquila (1209–1214)	Ranulf of Wareham (1217–1222)	Ralph Neville (1224–1244)	Richard of Chichester (1244–1253)	John Climping (1253–1262)	Stephen Bersted (1262–1287)	Gilbert of St Leonard (1288–1305)	
10	Bishops of Exeter	South-West	Devonshire		Henry Marshal (bishop of Exeter) (1194–1206)	Simon of Apulia (1214–1223)	William Briwere (1224–1244)	Richard Blund (1245–1257)	Walter Branscombe (1258–1280)	Peter Quinel (1280–1291)	Thomas Bitton (1291–1307)		
11	Bishops of Lincoln	East Midlands	Lincolnshire		Hugh of Wells (1209–1235)	Robert Grosseteste (1235–1253)	Henry of Lexington (1254–1258)	Richard of Gravesend (1258–1279)	Oliver Sutton (bishop) (1280–1299)				
12	Bishops of Hereford	West Midlands	Herefordshire										
13	Bishops of Coventry and Lichfield	West Midlands	Staffordshire										
14	Bishops of Rochester	South-East	Kent										
15	Bishops of Worcester	West Midlands	Worcestershire		Mauger of Worcester (1199–1212)	Randulf of Evesham (1212–1214)	Walter de Gray (1214–1216)	Sylvester of Worcester (1216–1218)	William de Blois (bishop of Worcester) (1218–1236)	Walter de Cantilupe (1236–1265)	Nicholas of Ely (1266–1268)	Godfrey Giffard (1268–1301)	
16	Abbots of Westminster	South-East	Middlesex		Ralph de Arundel (1200–1214)	William de Humez (1214–1222)	Richard of Barking (1222–1246)	Richard de Crokesley (1246–1258)	Richard of Ware (1258–1283)	Walter de Wenlok (1283–1307)			
17	Abbots of St. Maries	York	Yorkshire		William de Roundel (?–1239)	Thomas de Warthill (~1239–~1258)	Simon de Warwick (1258–1296)	Benedict de Malton (1296–1303)					
18	Abbots of Peterborough	East Midlands	Cambridgeshire		Acharius (1200–1210)	Robert of Lindsey (1214–1222)	Alexander of Holdermess (1222–1226)	Martin of Ramsey (1226–1233)	Walter of Bury St Edmunds (1233–1245)	John de Caux (1250–1262)	Robert of Sutton (1262–1273)	Richard of London (1274–1295)	William of Woodward (1295–1299)
19	Abbots of BlackFriars												
20	Abbots of GreyFriars												
21	Abbots of battle Abbey												

== Barons & Royal Demesne Equivalents ==
Holding land per baronium (by barony) was considered the highest form of land tenure. Barons were generally tenants in chief who held usually 10-50 manors, often scattered around but usually with a general grouping of estates around the Caput Baronium. Many of these manors were held by knights who provided military service to their lord. Often a few of the baron's manors were held from another tenant in chief. A barony with more than 20 manors in it was termed an honour. Most bishops also held their land per baronium and all earls held their land per baronium.

=== Welsh Marcher Barons Under the Crown ===
Marcher-lords enjoyed a greater degree of independence, holding almost all feudal rights to build castles, have sheriffs, declare war, establish boroughs, establish markets, confiscate lands, legislative power and hold mini parliament. However, they could not mint coins nor could they judge someone guilty of high treason, and if they died without heirs, their land would revert to the crown. Marcher lordships seem to have functioned in a similar way to that of a state in the Holy Roman Empire, enjoying extensive freedom but still subject to the crown.

Barony of	Coats of arms	1st	2nd	3rd	4th
Barony of Meath/Fingal		Walter de Lacy, Lord of Meath (1194–1241)			
Barony of Clifford		Walter de Clifford (died 1221) (1199–1208)	Walter de Clifford (died 1263) (1208–1263)	John Giffard, 1st Baron Giffard (1263–1299 title changed to Baron Giffard?)	
Barony of Bramber		William de Braose, 4th Lord of Bramber (1179–1211)	Reginald de Braose (1211–1228)		
Barony of Glamorgon		(Held by the Earls of Gloucester)			
Barony of Gower		John de Braose	William de Braose, 1st Baron Braose		
Barony of Whittingham		Maurice of Powis (1200–1204)	Fulk FitzWarin (1204–1258) [As a vassal of the Earls of Gloucester]		
Barony of Dyffryn Clwyd (Grey)		Henry de Grey (~1200–1219)	Sir John de Grey (~1219–1266)	Reginald de Grey, 1st Baron Grey de Wilton (1266–1308)	
Barony of Brecknock		John de Havering			
Barony of Wigmore/Mortimer		Roger Mortimer of Wigmore (1181–1214)	Ralph de Mortimer (1227–1246)	Roger Mortimer, 1st Baron Mortimer (1246–1308)	
Barony of Montgomery		William de Boell (1233–~1250)			
Barony of Knockin		John Lestrange (~1223–1269)			
Barony Mortimer de Chirk		Roger Mortimer de Chirk (~1275–1326)			
Barony of Cemais/Kemes		William I FitzMartin (~1190–1209)	William II FitzMartin (1209–1216)	Sir Nicholas FitzMartin (~1225–1282)	William, Lord Martin (1282–1324)
Barony of Monmouth		John Fitzgilbert de Monmouth (1189–1248)	John de Monmouth (Baron) (1248–1257)	John II de Monmouth (1257–1281) (Hanged for murder)	
Barony of Blenlevenny		Peter FitzHerbert (~1214–1235)	Herbert Fitzpiers (1235–1248)	Reginald FitzPiers (1248–1286)	John FitzReginald (1286–1310)
Lordship of Monmouth		John of Monmouth (1189–1248)	John of Monmouth (died 1257) (1248–1257)		
Lordship of Carleon/Machen Castle		Hywel ab Iorwerth (~1184–1216)	Morgan ap Hywel (1216–1248)		

=== Feudal Barons and Barons by Writ Under the Crown ===
There is no sharp distinction between feudal baronies and baronies by writ, because barons were already being summoned to royal councils before the 1295 Model Parliament institutionalised the use of writs for parliamentary summonses.

Barons who attended the Curia Regis of 1237 were undoubtedly equal in rank to the ones later summoned to the parliaments of 1246 and beyond. In fact many of the barons attending the Curia Regis were predecessors to those attending the later Parliaments.

==== Bedfordshire ====
Barony of	Coats of arms	1st	2nd	3rd	4th	5th	6th
Honour of Bedford		Falkes de Breauté (1216–1224)	Besieged and confiscated by the crown				
Barony of Eaton Bray		William de Cantilupe (died 1239)	William de Cantilupe (died 1251)	William de Cantilupe (died 1254)	George de Cantilupe		
Barony de Wahull of Odell Castle		Walter de Wahull II (~1170–1208)	Saher de Wahull (~1208–1250)	Walter de Wahull III (~1250–1269)	John de Wahull (1269–1296)	Thomas de Wahull (1296–1303)	
Barony of Cainhoe		Under the house de Albini until 1233					
Barony of Old Wardon		Walter de Trailly (1180–1206)	Walter de Trailly II (1206–1220)	John de Trailly (1220–1235)	John de Trailly II (1235–1272)	Walter de Trailly III (1272–1289)	John de Trailly III (1289–1304)
Barony of Tilsworth Castle		Adam de Moreteyn (1175–1210)	Eustace I de Morteyn (1210–1223)	Eustace II de Morteyn (1223–1234)	Roger de Morteyn I (1234~1280)	Roger de Morteyn II (~1280–1320)	

==== Berkshire ====
Barony of	Coat of arms	1st	2nd	3rd	4th	5th	6th
Royal Demesne in Berkshire		Key Holdings Include:. Windsor Castle. Bray (Village)?					
Barony of Langley		Adam de Tindale II (1190–1250)	Nicholas de Bolteby (1250–1273)	Adam de Bolteby (1273–1291)	Thomas de Lucy (1291–1304)		

==== Buckinghamshire ====
Barony of	Coat of arms	1st	2nd	3rd	4th	5th	6th
Barony of Hanslope		William Maudit of Hanslope (~1196–1257), Hereditary Chamberlain of the Exchequer	William Mauduit, 8th Earl of Warwick(1230–1268), Earl of Warwick				
Barony of Lavendon		William Brewer (justice)					
Barony of Whitchurch/Bolbec Castle		Hugh de Vere, 4th Earl of Oxford					
Barony of Wolverton		William FitzHamo (1200–1247)	John Wolverton (baron) (1247–1274)	John Wolverton II (1274–1341)			
Moietys of Eton		William de Wyndsore (1198–1215)	William de Wyndsore II (1215–1248)	William de Wyndsore III (1248–1273)	Richard de Wyndsore (1273–1326)		

==== Cambridgeshire ====
Barony of	Coat of arms	1st	2nd	3rd
Royal Demesne in Cambridgeshire		Key Holdings Include: 1. Cambridge Castle; 2. Comberton (Manor); 3. Hinxton		
Barony of Caxton		?	?	?

==== Cornwall ====
Barons of	Coats of arms	1st	2nd	3rd	4th	5th	6th
Barony of Launceston		Escheated to the crown in 1189 and granted to John, King of England (1189–1216) before he was king of England, Later became a royal fief.					
Barony of Trematon (Honour)		Roger II de Vautort (1173–1206)	Reginald II de Vautort (1206–1245)	Ralph II de Vautort (1245–1257)	Reginald III de Vautort (1257–1269)	Roger I	Passed to the earl of Cornwall in 1270
Barony of Cardinham (Honour)		Robert de Cardinham (~1200–1230)	Andrew de Cardinham (1230–1254)	Thomas de Tracey (1254–1270)	Oliver de Dynham (1270–1299)		

==== Cumbria ====
Barons of	Coat of arms	1st	2nd	3rd	4th	5th	6th
Barony of Allerdale/Cockermouth		barony in moieties					
Barony of Burgh by Sands		Hugh de Morville (?–1202)	Thomas I de Multon (1202–1240)	Thomas II de Multon (1240–1271)	Thomas III de Multon (1271–1293)	Thomas IV de Multon (1293–1295)	Thomas de Multon, 1st Baron Multon of Gilsland (1295–1313)
Barony of Copeland		Richard de Luci (1198–1213)	Lambert de Multon (1213–1246)	Thomas de Multon, Baron de Lucy (1246–1294)	Thomas de Multon (1294–1322)		
Barony of Crosby		Bishop of Carlisle					
Barony of Dalston		Oliver de Vaux (~1205–1230?)	Bishop of Carlisle (1230–?)				
Barony of Egremont		Richard de Luci (1198–1213)	Alan de Multon (1213–1256)	Thomas de Lucy (1256–1305)			
Barony of Greystoke		William I de Greystoke (1190–1209)	Thomas de Greystoke (1209–1247)	Robert de Greystoke (1247–1264)	William II de Greystoke (1274–89)	John de Greystoke, 1st Baron Greystoke (1289–1306)	
Barony of Irthington/Gilisland		Robert II de Vaux of Gilisland (1199–1235)	Hubert II de Vaux (1235–1240)	Thomas II de Multon (1240–1271)	Thomas III de Multon (1271–1293)	Thomas IV de Multon (1293–1295)	Thomas de Multon, 1st Baron Multon of Gilsland (1295–1313)
Barony of Kirklinton		barony in moieties					
Barony of Lidell		Nicholas I de Stuteville (1183–1218)	Nicholas II de Stuteville (1218–1233)	Split into moieties, between heiresses Joan, wife of Hugh Wake and Margaret, wife of William de Mastac.	Baldwin Wake (1276–1286)	John Wake, 1st Baron Wake of Lidell (1286–1300)	
Penrith, honour of (1237 creation)		King of Scotland (1237–1296)	English crown (1296–?)				
Barony of Wigton		Adam de Wigton (?–1225)	Odard de Wigton (1225–1238)	Adam de Wigton (1238–1251)	Walter de Wigton (1251–1286)	John de Wigton (1286–1315)	

==== Derbyshire ====
Barons of	Coats of arms	1st	2nd	3rd	4th	5th
Royal Demesne in Derbyshire		Key Holdings Include:. Barony of the Peak (Honour of Peverel). Bolsover Castle				
Barons of Horsley		William Brewer (justice) (1204–1226)				
Barony of Stavely		Ralph Musard (1185–1230)	Ralph II Musard (1230–1264)	Ralph III Musard (1264–1272)	John Musard (1272–1289)	Nicholas Musard (1289–1300)
Barony of Crick		Anker de Frescheville (~1200–1218)	Ralph Frescheville (1218–1261)	Anker II de Frescheville (1261–1266)	Ralph II de Frescheville (1266–1325)	

==== Devonshire ====
Barony of	Coats of arms	1st	2nd	3rd	4th	5th
Royal Demesne of Devonshire		Key Holdings Include:. Devon Castle. Honour of Barnstaple. Barony of Bradninch. Rougemont Castle (Probably). Lydford Castle (Until 1239)				
Barony of Plympton		(Honour, Held by the earls of Devon)				
Barony of Okehampton		Robert de Courtenay (1194–1242)	John de Courtenay(1242–1273)	Hugh Courtenay(1273–1291)	John de Courtenay II(1291~1340)	
Barony of Bampton		Fulk Paynel II (1199–1208)	William Paynel (1208–1228)	William Paynel II (1228–1248)	John de Ballon (1248–1275)	John de Cogan (1275–1303)
Barony of Berry Pomeroy		Henry II de la Pomeroy (1165–1207)	Henry III de la Pomeroy (1207–1222)	Henry IV de la Pomeroy (1222–1237)	Henry V de la Pomeroy (1237–1281)	Henry VI de la Pomeroy (1281–1305)
Barony of Totnes (Honour)		Henry FitzCount "Earl" of Cornwall (1209–1221)	Passes to Earls of Cornwall			
Barony of Barnstaple		Nicholas FitzMartin (1257–1260)	Geoffrey de Camville (~1260–1308)			
Barony of Great Torrington		de Torrington	Matthew de Torrington (~1170–1227)			

==== Dorset ====
Barony of	Coat of arms	1st				
Royal Demesne in Dorset		Key Holdings Include:. Corfe Castle. Dorchester castle. Royal Forest of Purbeck				
Barony Mandeville of Marshwood		Robert de Mandeville (1206–1242)?	Geoffrey de Mandeville II Baron of Marshwood (1242–1269)	John de Mandeville (died 1276) (1269–1276)	John III de Mandeville (1276–1297)	Roger de Mandeville IV (1297–1324)
Barony of Poorstock		Robert de Newburgh (Died 1246) (1194–1246)	Henry Newburgh (1246~1280)	John de Newburgh (~1280–1309)		
Barony of Winterbourne st Martin		Alfred de Lincoln (1198–1240)	Alfred de Lincoln (died 1264) (1240–1264)	Robert Fitzpayne (1264–1281)	Robert FitzPayne, 1st Baron FitzPayne (1281–1315)	

==== Essex ====
Barony of	Coats of arms	1st	2nd	3rd	4th	5th
Royal Demesne in Essex		Key Holdings Include: 1. Colchester Castle; 2. Fremlingham Manor; 3. Hatfield Broad Oak (Village)				
Barony of Little/Lidell Dunmow		Robert Fitzwalter (1198–1235)	Walter Fitzwalter (1235–1258)	Robert FitzWalter, 1st Baron FitzWalter (1268–1326)		
Barony of Stanstead		Richard de Montfichet (~1200–1267)				
Barony of Aveley		?				
Barony of Hedingham		de Vere				
Barony of Pleshy		Geoffrey Fitz Peter, 1st Earl of Essex (1199–1213)	Geoffrey FitzGeoffrey de Mandeville, 2nd Earl of Essex (1213–1216)	William FitzGeoffrey de Mandeville, 3rd Earl of Essex (1216–1227)		
Barony of Stansted Mountfitchet		William de Forz, 3rd Earl of Albemarle (1195–1242)	William de Forz, 4th Earl of Albemarle (1242–1260)	Thomas de Forz (1260–1269)	Aveline de Forz, Countess of Aumale (1269–1274)	Escheats to the crown
Barony of Writtle		Robert de Brus, 4th Lord of Annandale (1212–1245)	Robert de Brus, 5th Lord of Annandale (1245–1295)	Robert de Brus, 6th Lord of Annandale (1295–1304)		
Barony of Rayleigh		Henry of Essex (~1120–1170)	Henry II of Essex (Uncertain)			

==== Gascony ====
Barony of	Coats of arms	1st	2nd	3rd	4th	5th	6th	7th
Viscounty of Benauges		Jean ler de Grailly (~1265–1304)						
Viscounty of Châtellerault		Hugh III, Viscount of Châtellerault (1185–1203)	Hugues de Surgères (1205–1211)	Raoul I of Exoudun (1211–1218)	Aimeri II de Châtellerault (1218–1221)	Jean, son of Aimeri II (1240–1290)	Geoffroy III of Lusignan (1259–1274)	Jean II d'Harcourt (1274–1302)
Barony of Albret		Amanieu IV (~1174–1209)	Amanieu V d'Albret (1209–1255)	Amanieu VI d'Albret (1255–1270)	Bernard Ezi I (1270–1281)	Matte d'Albret (1281–1295)	Isabelle d'Albret (1295–1298)	Amanieu VII d'Albret (1298–1324)
Barony of Espelette								
Barony of Pons		Renaud II de Pons (1191–1252)						
Barony de Curton		Amanieu de Curton (12??–12??)						
Barony de L'Isle-Jourdain		Jourdain III (1196–1205)	Bernard II Jourdain (1205–1228)	Bernard III Jourdain (1228–1240)	Jourdain IV (1240–1271)	Jourdain V (1271–1303)		

==== Gloucestershire ====
Barony of	Coats of arms	1st	2nd	3rd	4th	5th	6th
Royal Demesne in Gloucestershire		Key Holdings Include:. Bristol Castle. Dymock? (Village)					
Barony de Berkeley (Later by writ)		Robert de Berkeley, 3rd feudal baron of Berkeley (1190–1220)	Thomas I de Berkeley, 4th feudal baron of Berkeley (1220–1243)	Maurice II de Berkeley, 5th feudal baron of Berkeley (1243–1281)			
Barony of Burford		Hugh Ferrers (1197–1204)	Robert Mortimer II (1211–1219)	William Stuteville (1219–1259)	Hugh Mortimer (13th century baron) (1259–1275)	Robert Mortimer (13th century baron) (1275–1287)	Hugh II Mortimer (13th century baron) (1287–1304)
Barony Giffard of Brimsfield		John Giffard, 1st Baron Giffard (~1255–1299)					
Barony of Beverston		Robert de Gournay (~1225–1269)	Anselm de Gournay (1269-1269-1286)	John de Gournay (1286–1291)	John Ap-Adam, 1st Baron Ap-Adam		
Barony of Kempford		Pain Chaworth (1199–1237)	Patrick de Chaworth (1237–1258)	Pain II de Chaworth (1258–1279)	Patrick de Chaworth (1279–1283)	Henry, 3rd Earl of Lancaster (1297–1345)	
Barony of Dursley		Roger de Berkeley (~1180–1220)	Henry de Berkeley (1220–1221)	John de Berkeley (1221–1245)	Henry de Berkeley (1245–1287)	William de Berkeley (Lord of Dursley) (1287–1300)	
Barony of Sudeley		Ralph de Sudeley (Baron) (1199–1221)	Ralph de Sufeley (died 1241) (1221–1241)	Bartholomew de Sudeley (1241–1280)	John Sudeley (1280–1336)		

==== Hampshire ====
Barony of	Coats of arms	1st	2nd
Royal Demesne of Hampshire		Key Holdings include: 1. Winchester Castle; 2.Odiham Castle: 3. Alton (Market town); 4.Basingbroke (Manor): 5. Portchester Castle; 6. Southampton Castle	
Barony of Basing		Robert St John (baron) (~1230–1267)	John St John (died 1302) (1267

==== Herefordshire ====
Barony of	Coats of arms	1st	2nd	3rd	4th
Barony of Snodhill		Robert de Chandos (Died 1220) (1193–1220)	Roger de Chandos (Died 1232) (1210–1232)	Roger de Chandos (Died 1266) (1232–1266)	Robert de Chandos (Died 1302) (1266–1302)
Barony of Kington		William de Braose (died 1230)	Humphrey de Bohun (Died 1265) (1230–1265)		
Barony of Richards Castle		Robert Mortimer II (1196–1219)	Hugh de Mortimer (Died 1274) (1219–1274)	Robert de Mortimer III (1274–1287)	Hugh Mortimer II (1287–1304)
Barony of Ewyas Harold		Robert de Tregoz (1175–1214)	Roger de Tregoz II (1214–1265)	John de Tregoz (1265–1300)	
Barony of Tarrington		Split into Moieties			
Barony of Weobley		De Laceys			
Barony of Much Marcle		John de Ballon (1203–1235)	John de Ballon II (1235–1275)	Reginald de Ballon (1275–1298)	

==== Hertfordshire ====
Barony of	Coats of arms	1st	2nd	3rd	4th
Kings Langley Palace		Eleanor of Castile (She purchased it giving the royal family direct power in that area)			
Barony of Walkern		William de Lanvallei (1204–1217)			
Barony of Flamstead		Roger de Toeni (Died 1209) (1162–1209)	Baldwin de Toeni (1209–1216)	Raoul de Toeni (1216–1239)	
Barony of Benington (Chamberlains of Scotland)		Philip de Valognes (1141–1215)	William de Valognes (1215–1219)	Robert Fitzwalter (1219–1235)	

==== Huntingdonshire ====
Barony of	Coat of arms	1st	2nd
Barony of Southoe		Nigel Lovetot (1191–1219)	Passes to Richard de Clare, 6th Earl of Gloucester

==== Kent ====
Barony of	Coats of arms	1st	2nd	3rd
Royal Demesne in Kent		Key Holdings Include:. Rochester Castle from 1216. Leeds Castle from 1278 (To the Queen). Stone Castle (Possibly). Sandwich Castle (Probably). Newenden Castle (Possibly)		
Barony of Chilham		Richard FitzRoy (~1214–1246)	Richard de Dover (1246–1270)	
Barony of Chatham		Baldwin Wake	Hamo de Crevecoeur (1216–1263)	John Wake, 1st Baron Wake of Liddell (~1285~1310)
Barony of Folkestone (Leeds)		Robert de Crevequer (1177–1216)	Hamo de Crevecoeur (1216–1263)	Split into Moieties
Barony of Shurland	?	?		
Barony of Aldington		Split into Moieties		

==== Lancashire ====
Barony of	Coats of arms	1st
Barony of Lancaster		John de Lancastre, 1st Baron Lancastre (~1291–1334)
Barony of Clitheroe (Honour)		Under the Earls of Lincoln
Barony of Hornby		Roger de Montbegon (~1200–1226)
Barony Boteler of Werrington		William Boteler, 1st Baron Boteler of Werington (1295–1328)

==== Leicestershire ====
Barons of	Coats of arms	1st	2nd
Royal Demesne in Leicestershire		Key Holdings Include: 1. Sauvey Castle; 2. Leighfield Forest	
Barony of Shere Belvoir		William d'Aubigny (rebel) (~1190–1236)	William d'Aubigny II of Clithroe (1236–1247)
Barony of Segrave		Stephen de Segrave (~1220–1241)	Nicholas Segrave, 1st Baron Segrave (~1270–1295)
Barony Ferrers of Groby		William Ferrers, 1st Baron Ferrers of Groby (1293–1325)	

==== Lincolnshire ====
Barony of	Coats of arms	1st	2nd	3rd	4th	5th
Royal Demesne in Lincolnshire		Key holdings include. Lincoln Castle. Cheddar Manor				
Barony of Brattleby		Nicola de la Haie (1169–1230)				
Barony of Winteringham		Robert Marmion (died 1242) (~1215–1241)	William Marmion, 2nd Baron Marmion of Winteringham (1241–1274)	John Marmion, 3rd Baron Marmion of Winteringham (1278–1322)		
Barony of Burghersh		Robert Burghersh, 1st Baron Burghersh				
Barony of Beke		Walter II Beke (~1240–1270)	John Beke, 1st Baron Beke (~1270–1304)			
Barony of Thoresway		Alan de Bayeux (1154–1210)	John de Bayeux (1210–1249)	Stephen de Bayeux (1249–1250)	Elias de Rabayne (1250–??)	
Barony of Tattershall		Robert de Tattershall (1185–1212)	Robert de Tattershall (died 1249) (1212–1249)	Robert de Tattershall (Died 1273) (1249–1273)	Robert de Tattershall (Died 1298) (1273–1298)	Robert de Tattershall (Died 1303) (1298–1303)
Barony of Nocton		Thomas Darcy (Died 1206) (~1185–1206)	Norman Darcy (1206–1254)	Philip Darcy (Baron) (1254–1264)	Norman Darcy II (1264–1296)	Philip Darcy II (1296–1333)
Barony of Freiston		Henry ap Longchamp (1211–1274)?				
Barony of Folkingham		Gilbert III de Gand (~1200–1242)	Gibert IV de Gand (1242–1273)	Gilbert V de Gand (1273–1298)	Split into Moeties	
Barony of Blythborough		Roger de Cressy (~1200–1246)	William de Cressy ? (1246-11311)			
Barony of Bourne		Baldwin Wake I (1172–1201)	Baldwin Wake II (1201–1213)	Hugh Wake of Bourne (1241)	Baldwin Wake III (1241–1311)	
Barony of Blankney		Oliver Deincourt (1183–1201)	Oliver Deincourt II (1201–1246)	John Deincourt II (1246–1257)	Edmund Deincourt (1257–1327)	
Barony of Bolingbroke		Under Earls of Chester	Split into Moeties			

==== Middlesex ====
Barony of	Coats of arms	1st	2nd
Royal Demesne in Middlesex		Key Holdings include: 1. The Tower of London; 2. Manor of Havering; 3. Hanworth Manor	
Barony of West-Greenwich		Geoffrey de Saye (~1200–1230)	William de Saye V (1230–1271)

==== Norfolk ====
Barony of	Coats of arms	1st	2nd	3rd	4th	5th
Barony of Wormegay		William Bardolf (leader) (1243–1276)				
Barony of Flockethorpe in Hardingham		Ralph Camoys (~1200–1259)	Ralph Camoys II (1259–1276)	John Camoys (1276–1298)	Ralph Camoys III (1298–1336, Lord Camoys)	
Barony of Dalston		Oliver de Vaux				
Honor of Bacton (Held under the Bishops of Norwich)		Philip de Valognes (1141–1215)	William de Valognes (1215–1219)	Split into Moieties		
Barony of Hockering		John Marshal of Hockering (1200–1235)	John Marshal II of Hockering (1235–1242)	William Marshal of Hockering (1242–1265)	John Marshal III of Hockering (1265–1282)	John Marshal IV of Hockering (1282–1315)
Barony of Old Buckenham		Held by the Earls of Arundel				

==== Northampton ====
Barony of	Coats of arms	1st	2nd	3rd	4th	5th
Royal Demesne in Northampton		Key Holdings Include: 1. Northampton Castle; 2. Rockingham castle & Forest; 3. Kings Cliffe & Kings House Lodge				
Barony of Chipping Warden		Richard Foliot (~1170–1203)	Wischard Ledet (1203–1222)	Christiana Ledet (1222–1271), her husbands	?	Thomas le Latimer (–1334)
Honour of Fotheringhay		Held by the earls of Huntingdon				
Barony of Crick		Anker de Frescheville (~1200–1220)	Ralph I de Frescheville (1220–1261)	Anker II de Frescheville (1261–1266)	Ralph de Freschville (~1266–1325, through regent until ~1285)	
Barony of Wedon-Pinkeney		Robert de Pinkeney (–1234)	Henry de Pinkeney (1234–1254)	Henry de Pinkeney (1254–1277)	Robert de Pinkeney (1277–1296)	Henry de Pinkeney (1296–1301)
Barony of Great Weldon		Richard Basset (Baron) (1180–1217)	Ralph Basset (Died 1258) (1217–1258)	Richard Bassat (1258–1276)	Ralph Bassat (1276–1291)	Richard Basset, 1st Baron Basset of Weldon (1291–1314)

==== Northumberland ====
Barony of	Coats of arms	1st	2nd	3rd	4th
Barony of Alnwick/de Vesci		Eustace de Vesci (1184–1216)	William de Vesci (d.1253) (1216–1253)	John de Vesci (1253–1289)	William de Vesci (d.1297) (1289–1297)
Barony of Morpeth		Roger de Merlay II (1188–1239)	Roger de Merlay III (1239–1265)		
Barony of Mitford		William Bertram, Lord of Mitford (1177–1205)	Roger Bertram II (1205–1242)	Roger Betram III (1242–1272)	
Barony of Wooler		Robert de Muschamp (1190–1205)	Robert II de Muschamp (1205–1250)	Split into Moieties	
Barony of Bothal		Robert Bertram I (Baron) (1176–1212)	Richard Bertram (Baron) (1212–1238)	Roger Bertram II (1238–1262)	Robert Bertram III (1262–1303)
Barony of styford aka Bolbec		Hugh de Bolebec (~1200–1240)	Hugh II de Bolebec (1240–1262)	Split into Moeties	
Barony of Hadstone		William Heron (baron) (1251–1257)	William Heron II (Baron) (1257–1296)	Walter Heron (Baron) (1296–1297)	Emmeline Heron (1297–1312), Passed to Husband
Barony of Hepple		Philip Chartney (~1230–1280)	Robert Chartney (~1280–1331)		
Barony of Callerton		Gilbert Delaval (~1150–1226)	Henry Delaval (1226–1270)	Robert Delaval (Baron) (1270–1297)	
Barony of Beanely		Patrick I, Earl of Dunbar (1182–1232)	Patrick II, Earl of Dunbar (1232–1248)	Patrick III, Earl of Dunbar (1248–1289)	Patrick IV, Earl of March (1289–1308)
Barony of Ellingham (Jesmond)		Ralf de Gaugi (1185–1243)	Ralph de Gaugi (1243–1279)	?	
Barony of Langley		William de Tunstal (~1220–1230)	Held by the Crown during Walter de Tunstals minority (He died Young)	Nicholas de Bolteby (1237–1273)	

==== Nottinghamshire ====
Barony of	Coats of arms	1st	2nd	3rd
Royal Demesne of Nottinghamshire		Key Holdings Include:. Barony of Ralph Tessun. Nottingham Castle. Sherwood Forest. Laxton Castle (1204–1230). Mansfield Manor		
Barony Everingham of Laxton		Adam de Everingham, 1st Baron Everingham (~1290–1340)		
Moiety of Shelford-Bardolf		Under the Bardolfs of Wormegay		
Moiety of Shelford-Birkin		John Birkin (Baron) (~1170–1227)	Robert de Everingham	
Barony of Tickhill				

==== Oxfordshire ====
Barons of	Coats of arms	1st	2nd	3rd	4th	5th	6th
Royal Demesne in Oxfordshire		Key Holdings Include. Beaumont Palace. Iffley (Manor)					
Barony of Wycombe		Alan Basset (~1190–1232)	Gilbert Basset (1232–1241)				
Barony of Wallingford (Honour)		John, King of England (~1200–1215)	Earls of Cornwall				
Barony Lovel de Tichmersh		John Lovel, 1st Baron Lovel (~1274–1311)					
Barony of Hook-Norton		Held by the Earls of Warwick					
Barony of Cogges		Alexander Arsic (~1190–1201)	John Arsic (Baron) (1201–1205)	Robert Arsic (Baron) (1205–1230)	Eustace de Greinville (1230–1241)	Gilbert Greinville (1241–1247)	John Engaine, 1st Baron Engaine (1247–1322
Barony of Headington		Thomas Basset (baron) (1182–1220)	Split into moieties				

==== Shropshire ====
Barony of	Coat of arms	1st	2nd	3rd	4th	5th	6th
Barony of Holgate		Roger Burnell (~1230–1259)	Robert Burnell (1259–1292)	Philip Burnell of Holgate (1292–1294)	John de Haudlo (1299–1346)		
Barony of Caus		Robert Corbet (Baron) (~1200–1222)	Thomas Corbet (Baron) (1222–1274)	Peter Corbet (Baron) (1274–1300)			
Barony of Diencourt		?					
Barony of Clun/Oswestry		William FitzAlan, 1st Lord of Oswestry and Clun (1160–1210)	John Fitzalan (died 1240) (1210–1240)	John Fitzalan (1223–1267) (1240–1267)	John Fitzalan (1246–1272) (1267–1272)	Richard Fitzalan (died 1302) (1272–1302)	
Barony of Pulverbatch		John de Kilpec (1173–1205)	Hugh de Kilpeck (1205–1244)	Split into Moieties			
Barony of Wem		Hugo Pantulf	William V Pantulf (~1200–1233)	Ralph III le boteler (~1250–1281)	Ralph le boteler of wem (1281–1283)	John le Boteler of Wem (1283–1287)	William le Boteler (~1287–1335)

==== Somerset ====
Barony of	Coats of arms	1st	2nd	3rd	4th	5th	6th
Royal Demesne in Somerset		Key Holdings Include: 1. Pitney Manor; 2. Wearne Manor					
Barony of Curry Mallet		William Malet (Magna Carta baron) (~1200–1215)					
Barony of Dunster (Honour, later barony de Mohun)		Reginald I de Mohun (1193–1213)	Reginald II de Mohun (1213–1258)	John de Mohun (1258–1279)	John de Mohun, 1st Baron Mohun (1279–1330)		
Barony of North Cadbury (Senior branch)		Henry William de Newmarch (1198–1204)	James de Newmarch (1204–1216)	Ralph Russell (Baron) (1216–~1240?)			
Barony of Castle Carrey		Henry II Lovel of Carrey (~1200–1218)	Richard I Lovel of Carrey (1218–1254)	Henry III Lovel of Carrey (1254–1262)	Henry IV Lovel of Carrey (1262–1280)	Hugh Lovel of Carrey (1280–1291)	Richard III Lovel of Carrey (1291–1325)
Barony of Blagdon		William FitzMartin II (1209–1215)	Nicholas FitzMartin (~1230–1282)	William Lord Martin (1282–1324)			
Barony of Hatch-Beauchamp		Robert de Beauchamp (1212–1250?)					
Barony of Stogursey		Warin II fitzGerold (~1210–1218)					
Barony of Nether Stowey		?					
Barony of Stoke Trister		Walter de Esselegh (1195–1245)	Richard (Lorti) Urtiaco (1245–1250)	Henry Urtiaco (1250–1321)			
Barony of Chiselborough		John Montague (Baron of Chiselborough) (~1200–1228)					
de Moels Moiety of North Cadbury		Nicholas de Moels (1230–1269)	Roger de Moels (1269–1294)	John de Moels, 1st Baron Moels (1294–1310)			
Poyntz Moiety of Curry Mallet		Hugh I Poyntz (1217–1220)	Nicholas I Poyntz (~1235–1273)	Nicholas I Poyntz (~1235–1273)			

==== Staffordshire ====
Barony of	Coats of arms	1st	2nd	3rd
Barony of Stafford (Later by writ)		Nicholas Stafford (Baron) (~1235–1287)	Edmund Stafford, 1st Baron Stafford (1287–1308)	
Barony Marmion of Tamworth (Hereditary Kings Champions)		Robert Marmion, 3rd Baron Marmion of Tamworth (~1200–1218)	Robert Marmion (died 1242) (1218–1242)	William Marmion (died 1274) (1242–1274?)
Barony of Drayton		Ralph Basset (died 1265)(~1250-65)	Ralph Basset, 1st Lord Basset of Drayton (1265–1299)	

==== Suffolk ====
Barony of	Coat of arms	1st	2nd	3rd	4th
Royal Demesne in Suffolk		Key holdings include: 1. Honour of Eye; 2. Mildenhall Manor; 3. Framlingham Manor; 4. Orford Castle; 5. Haughley Manor/Castle			
Barony of Ashfield/Ixworth		William Blund (~1195–1228)	William le Blount, 6th baron Ixworth (1228–1264)	Split into Moieties	
Barony of Framlingham		Held by the Earls of Norfolk			
Barony of Great Bealings & Liberty of Ipswhich		Gilbert de Pecche (1188–1212)	Hamon III de Pecche (1212–1241)	Simon Pecche (1241–1335)	

==== Surrey ====
Barony of	Coats of arms	1st	2nd
Barony of Shere		John Fitzgeoffrey (?1227–1258)	John FitzJohn (1258–1264, 1266–1275)

==== Sussex ====
Barony of	Coats of arms	1st	2nd
Royal Demesne in Sussex		Key Holdings Include: 1. Rye Castle; 2. Winchelsea (Town); 3. Peventsy Castle (Queens Castle); 4. Knepp Castle	
Barony of Hussey		Henry Hussey, 1st Baron Hussey (~1285–1332)	
Barony of Hastings		Henry de Hastings (died 1268) (1250–1268)	John Hastings, 1st Baron Hastings (1268–1313)
Barony of Lewes		Held by the Earls of Surrey	

==== Warwickshire ====
Barony of	Coats of arms	1st
Royal Demesne of Warwickshire		Key Holdings Include: 1. Kenilworth Castle; 2. Bidford on Avon (Town)
Barony of Astley		Andrew de Astley (~1285–1301)
Barony of Clinton		John Clinton, 1st Baron Clinton (~1290–1315)

==== Westmorland ====
Barony of	Coats of arms	1st	2nd	3rd	4th
Barony of Kendal		Gilbert fitz Roger fitz Reinfried (1196–1220)	William de Lancastre III (1220–1246)	Divided between heiresses: Helwise, wife of Peter de Brus II; Alice, wife of William de Lyndesey and Serota, wife of Alan de Multon.	
Barony of Appleby		Robert de Vieuxpont (~1203–1228)	John de Vieuxpont (1228–1241)	Robert de Vieuxpont II (1241–1264)	Divided between heiresses: Isabella, wife of Roger de Clifford and Idonea, wife of Roger de Leybourne

==== Wiltshire ====
Barony of	Coat of arms	1st	2nd	3rd	4th
Clarendon Forest		Part of the royal domain, used as a hunting grounds based at a royal lodge			
Barony of Westone (West Dean)		Split into moieties			
Barony of Castle Combe		Walter de Dunstanville II (~1200–1241)	Walter de Dunstanville III (1241–1270)	John de la Mare (Baron) (~1290–1313)	
Barony of Erlestoke		Matthew FitzHerbert (~1200–1231)	Herbert FitzMatthew (1231–1245)	John FitzMatthew (1245–1261)	Matthew Fitzjohn (1261–1309)
Barony of Keevil					
Barony of Trowbridge					
Barony of Chitterne					

==== Worcestershire ====
Barony of	Coats of arms	1st	2nd	3rd	4th
Barony of Elmley Castle or Salworpe		Walter de Beauchamp (justice) (~1210–1236)	William (III) de Beauchamp (1236–1269)	Walter de Beauchamp (Steward to Edward I) (1269–1306)	
Barony of Bisset		Henry Bisset (1177–1208)	William Bisset (died 1220) (1208–1220)	John Bisset (died 1240) (1220–1240)	Divided between heiresses: Margery, wife of Richard de Rivers; Ela, wife of John de Wotton; and Isabel, wife of Hugh de Plescy.
Barony of Dudley		Ralph de Somery I (1194–1210)	Roger de Somery II (1235–1272)	Roger de Somery III (1272–1291)	John de Somery (1291–1322)

==== Yorkshire ====
Barony of	Coats of arms	1st	2nd	3rd	4th	5th	6th	7th	8th
Royal Demesne in Yorkshire		Key Holdings Include:. Honour of Knaresborough. Honour of Tickill. Honour of Stuteville. Painel Barony. Newcastle. Scarborough Castle. Boroughbridge Manor							
Barony of Richmond (Honour, See Earls of Richmond above)		Peter II, Count of Savoy (1240–1268)							
Barony Percy (Topcliffe/Alnwick later by writ)		Richard de Percy (~1200–1244)	William de Percy, 6th Baron Percy (1197–1245) (1244–1245?)	Henry de Percy, 7th Baron Percy (1228–1272) (1245–1272?)	John de Percy, 8th Baron Percy (died 1285/93) (1272–1293?)	Henry Percy, 1st Baron Percy (1293–1314)			
Barony of Pontefract		Roger de Lacy (1170–1211) (1194–1211)	John de Lacy, 2nd Earl of Lincoln (1211–1240)	Edmund de Lacy, Baron of Pontefract (1248–1258)	Henry de Lacy, 3rd Earl of Lincoln (1258–1311)				
Barony of Skelton		Peter I de Brus (1188–1222)	Peter II de Brus (1222–1240)	Peter III de Brus (1240–1272)	Walter de Fauconberg, 1st Baron Fauconberg (1272–1304)				
Barony of Hallamshire		Gerard III de Furnival (~1195–1219)	Thomas I de Furnival (1219–1238)	Gerard IV de Furnival (1238–1261)	Thomas II de Furnival (1261–1291)	Thomas de Furnival, 1st Baron Furnival (1291–1332)			
Barony of Bedale/FitzAlan		Bryan FitzAlan (?–1242)	Alan FitzBrian (1242–1267)	Bryan FitzAlan, Lord FitzAlan (1267–1306)					
Barony of Mauley/Mulgrave		Peter de Maulay (~1210–1241)	Peter Mauley, 1st Baron Mauley (1249–1308)						
Barony of Hylton		Robert Hylton, 1st Baron Hylton (~1285–1322)							
Barony of Hazlewood		Robert le Vavasour (~1200–1230)	William Vavasour (13th century) (~1270–1295)	William le Vavasour, 1st Baron Vavasour (~1290–1313)					
Barony de Mowbray/Thursk		William de Mowbray (~1200–1224)	Roger II de Mowbray (1240–1266)	Roger de Mowbray, 1st Baron Mowbray (1266–1297)	John de Mowbray, 2nd Baron Mowbray (1297–1322)				
Barony of Wark (Honour)		Robert de Ros (died 1227) (1183–1227)	Robert de Ros, Baron Wark (1227–1269)	Robert de Ross II of Wark (1269–1274)	Robert de Ross III of Wark (1274–1310)				
Barony de Bywell		Eustace de Balliol (1190–1209)	Hugh de Balliol (1209–1229)	John I de Balliol (1229–1268)	John Balliol (1268–1314?)				
Barony of Hooton Levitt		William Levett (baron) (~1230–1270)							
Barony of Grimethorpe		Ralph Fitzwilliam (~1268–1317)							
Barony of Skipton		Held by the Earls of Aumale	Edmund Crouchback (1269–1296)						
Barony of Burstwick and Holderness		Held by the Earls of Aumale	Edmund Crouchback (1269–1296)						
Barony of Cottingham		William de Stuteville (1183–1203)	Robert de Stuteville (Baron) (1203–1205)	Nicholas I de Stuteville (1205–1218)	Nicholas II de Stuteville (1218–1233)	Hugh Wake (Baron) (1233–1241)	Hugh Bigod (Justiciar) (1244–1266)	Baldwin Wake (Baron) (1266–1282)	John Wake, 1st Baron Wake of Liddell (1282–1300)
Barony of Hooton Pagnell		Andrew Luttrell (~1230–1264)	Geoffrey Luttrell (Died 1270) (1264–1270)	Robert Luttrell (Died 1297) (1270–1297)	Geoffrey Luttrell (1297–1335)				
Barony of Skirpenbeck		Walter Chauncy (Baron) (1192–1228)	Roger de Chauncy (1228–1238)	Robert de Chauncy II (1238–1246)	Thomas de Canci (Baron) (1246–1309)				
Barony of Kirklington		Adam de Levington II (1175–1210)	Ralph de Levington (1210–1253)	Eustace de Balliol of Kirklington (1253~1274)	Split into moieties				

==== Unknown/Unclassifiable ====
Barony of	Coats of arms	1st	2nd	3rd	4th
Barony of Raby (Later Barons Neville by writ, possibly vassals of durham?)		Geoffrey de Neville (died 1242) (12??–1242)	Robert de Neville (1242–1283)	Ranulph Neville, 1st Baron Neville (1283–1331	
Barony of Alditheley		Henry Audley (~1200–1246)			
Barony of Huntercombe		Walter de Huntercombe, 1st Baron Huntercombe (1295–1313)			
Barony of le Despenser		Hugh le Despenser (sheriff) (1218–1238)	Hugh Despenser (justiciar) (1238–1265)	Hugh Despenser the Elder (1285–1326) [Later as Earl of Winchester]	
Barony de Ross		Robert de Ros (died 1227) (~1205–1227)			
Barony of Prudhoe		Richard Umfraville (1182–1226)	Gilbert Umfraville I (1245)	Gilbert Umfraville II (1245–1308) [Also ruled as Earl of Angus]	
Barony la Zouche		Alan la Zouche (died 1270) (~1237–1270)	Roger la Zouche (1270–1285)	Alan la Zouche, 1st Baron Zouche of Ashby (1285–1314)	
Barony de Furnivall		Gerard de Furnival (~1200–1219)	Thomas de Furnivall, 1st Baron Furnivall (~1290–1332)		
Barony de Montalt		Roger de Montalt, 1st Baron Montalt (~1285–1297)			
Barony de Grandison		Otto de Grandson (1277–1328)			
Barony de Clavering		Robert fitzRoger (1177–1214)	John FitzRobert (1214–1240)	Roger FitzJohn (1240–1249)	Robert fitzRoger (died 1310) (1249–1310)
Barony de Scales		Robert Scales, 1st Baron Scales (~1277–1304)			
Barony of Montagu		Simon Montagu, 1st Baron Montagu (~1280–1316)			
Barony of Manchester		Robert de Gresle (1182–1230)	Thomas de Gresle (1230 - 1261)	Robert de Gresle (1261 - 1282)	Thomas de Gresle (1282 - 1313

=== Barons by Service to the Crown ===
These were royal servants who were deemed to have held the status of baron even if they did not hold any land.

Barony of	Coat of arms	1st	2nd	3rd	4th	5th	6th	7th	8th
Lord warden of the cinque ports		William of Huntingfield (1203)	Peter de Rivaux (1232–1234)	Bertram de Criol (1242–55)	Roger Northwode (1255–1258)	Richard de Grey (1268)	Nicholas de Moels (1258–1269)	Henry de Montfort (1264–1265)	Stephen de Pencester (1267–1299)
Barons of the Exchequer		Roger Northwode (1255–1258)	John de Cobham						
Baron Butler (of Ireland)		Theobald Walter, 1st Chief Butler of Ireland (1185–1206)	Theobald le Botiller, 2nd Chief Butler of Ireland (1206–1230)	Theobald Butler, 3rd Chief Butler of Ireland (1230–1248)	Theobald Butler, 4th Chief Butler of Ireland (1248–1285)	Edmund Butler, Earl of Carrick (1285–1321)			
Baron of the Exchequer		Alexander de Swereford (C. 1216-1246)							

Under the Earls of Chester:

The earls of Chester were considered earls-palatine of the earldom of Chester. They had almost complete rights over their domain and ruled like kings: they had their own court with their own barons, and their own justices. Chester was last held be a non-royal by John the Scot who died in 1237. It then passed to the crown and was given to a royal relative.

Barony of	Coats of arms	1st	2nd	3rd	4th
Barony of Mold					
Barony of Halton		Roger de Lacy (1170–1211) (1194–1211)	Later held by the de lacey Earls of Lincoln		
Barony of Malbank		Split into 3 moieties			
Barony of Malpas		David Dan de Malpas (~1210–1260)			
Barony of Dunham-Massey		Hamon III de Massey Baron of Dunham Massey (1185–1216)	Hamon de Massey IV (1216–1250)	Baron Hamon de Massey V (1250–1278)	Hamon VI de Massey Baron of Dunham Massey
Barony of Shipbrook		Warin de Vernon 6th Baron of Shipbrook	Warine de Vernon 7th-Baron of Shipbrook	Warin de Vernon 8th Baron of Shipbrook	
Barony of Kinderton		William de Venables 4th Baron of Kinderton (1188–1228)	Hugh de Venables Baron of Kinderton (1228–1269)	William de Venables Baron of Kinderton (1269–1292)	
Barony of Lidell					
Barony of Fauconberg		Walter de Fauconberg, 1st Baron Fauconberg (~1285–1304)			
Barony of Montalt		Roger de Montalt, 1st Baron Montalt (~1285–1297)			

De Facto Under the Justiciar of Ireland:

These lords were the descendants of Norman adventurers who had come over to Ireland following Richard FitzGodbert de Roche, Strong-bow, and others who had originally come as mercenaries for an Irish prince. These Norman adventurers had continued their predecessors conquest by making alliances, truces, pushing wars, etc. Although briefly almost independent of England, royal authority was soon established in Ireland.

Barony of	Coat of arms	1st	2nd	3rd	4th
Barony of Desmond		John FitzGerald, 1st Baron Desmond (1259–1261)	Thomas FitzGerald, 2nd Baron Desmond (1261–1298)	Thomas FitzGerald, 3rd Baron Desmond (1296-1307)	
Barony of Offaly		Gerald FitzMaurice, 1st Lord of Offaly (1193–1204)	Maurice FitzGerald, 2nd Lord of Offaly (1204–1257)	Maurice FitzGerald, 3rd Lord of Offaly (1257–1286)	John FitzGerald, 1st Earl of Kildare (1286–1316)[In his last year of life he became earl of Kildare]
Barony of Ards		John de Courcy (1176–1205)			
Barony of Connaacht		Richard Mór de Burgh, 1st Baron of Connaught (1227–1243)			
Barony of Trim/Baron Geneville		Geoffrey de Geneville, 1st Baron Geneville (~1260–1314)			
Barony of Foliot		Jordan Foliot (~1290–1298)			
Barony of Barryscourt Castle		Robert de Barry	William de Barry		
Barony of Lackeen Castle		Kennedies			

Under the Barons of Fingal (lordship of Meath Ireland):

Hugh de Lacey was granted the lordship of Meath shortly after the invasion of Ireland. However there was an Irish king who claimed the land as his own. Hugh invited this king to parley but it went poorly and it ended in the Irish being slaughtered. Because of nature of the lordship Hugh had the authority to appoint his own barons and had similar powers to a marcher lord

Barony of	Coats of arms	1st	2nd	3rd			
Barony of Navan		Gilbert de Angulo (1195–1213)	Phillip de Angulo (1213–1245)	Miles de Angulo (1245–1259)	Hugh de Angulo (1259~1264)	Jordan de Angulo (~1264–1295)	John de Nangle (~1295–1335)
Barony of Galtrim		Held by a branch of the Hussey family					
Barony of Skryne		Richard de Feypo I (~1191–1240)	Richard de Feypo II (~1240–1290)	Simon de Feypo (~1295–1310)			
Barony of Castleknock		Richard Tyrell (Baron) (1199~1240)					

Under the earls of Pembroke:

Barony of	1st	2nd	3rd
Barons of Norragh	Peter de Norrach (~1200–1241)	Geoffrey de Norrach (1241~1260)	William de Norrach (~1260~1318) [Held in fealty to the Baron of Hastings strangely]

== Knights and Officials of the Royal household ==
These are companions of the Kings of England during the 13th century. The kings kept household knights and a variety of skilled noblemen including administrators, scribes, and judges in his court in order to do his bidding in administrative, military and judicial matters. In many cases noblemen would serve in more than one office depending on their favor with the king at the time. These nobles tended to be lesser nobles who acquired land, offices, and titles by service to the king. The office or Royal Steward was the highest office in the kings household who was responsible for managing the entire household including ensuring discipline within the ranks of the household knights.

Under King John:

Name	Coat of arms	Relations	Lived	Lands/Offices/Functions	Loyal to John in the Civil war?
Philip of Oldcoates			~1170–1220	1.Lord of lands in Northumberland: 2. Administrator of Durham during Vacancy; 3.Custodian of Guersney: 4. Sheriff of Northumberland (1212–1220); 5. Custodian of New Castle, Bamburgh Castle, & Durham Castle; 6. Household Knight	Loyalist
Falkes de Breauté			~1180–1226	1.Constable of Caermarthen, Cardigan & Gower (1207– 2.Royal Steward (1215): 3. Household Knight	Loyalist
Hugh de Neville			~1180–1236	1.Chief Forester (1198–1216, 1224–1234) 2.Sheriff of Oxfordshire (1196~1199) 3.Sheriff of Essex (1197–~1200) 4.Sheriff of Hertfordshire (~1197–1200): 5. Sheriff of Hampshire (1210–1212); 6. Sheriff of Cumberland (1210–1212); 7. Sheriff of Lincolnshire (1227); 8. Household Knight	Deserted in 1216 French invasion of England but returned to John
Geoffrey de Neville (died 1225)			~1170–1225	1.Royal Steward 2.Royal Chamberlain 3.Sheriff of Wiltshire (1207–1210) 4.Sheriff of Yorkshire (1216–1223) 5.Seneschal of Gascony (1214, 1218–1219) 6.Diplomat: 7. Household Knight	Loyalist
Philip d'Aubigny			1166–1236	1.Keeper of the Channel Islands: 2. Lord of Chewton Mendip, South Petherton, Bampton, Waltham, & Ingleby; 3.Tutor of Henry III 4.Royal Commander: 5. Household Knight	Loyalist
Henry de Grey			1155–1219	1. Court Favorite	Unknown
Henry de Longchamp			1150–1212	1.Sheriff of Worcestershire (1195–1197): 2. Former Advisor of Richard I of England	Dead before war
Engelard de Cigogné			~1180–1244	1.Constable of Loches Castle (1205): 2. Sheriff of Gloucestershire & Herefordshire (1210–1215); 3.Constable of Windsor Castle (1215, 1234–1242): 4. Sheriff of Oxfordshire & Berkshire (1233); 5.Lord of Benson in Oxfordshire 6.Keeper of Eleanor, Fair Maid of Brittany	Loyalist
Reginald de Cornhill		Brother of Reginald de Cornhill	~1165–1220	1.Sheriff of Surrey (1196–1215) 2.Collector of Import/Export taxes (1202–1204 3.Sheriff of Lancashire (1215) 4.Constable of Rochester Castle (1215) 5.Keeper of the kings ports and galleys (1216): 6. Household Knight	Traitor
John Russell (knight)			~1160–1224	1.Royal Steward 2.Custodian of Corfe Castle (1221–1224) and Sherborne (1224): 3. Sheriff of Somerset (1223–1224); 4. Household Knight	Probably a Loyalist
Geoffrey de Luterel			1158–1218	1. Courtier; 2. Household Knight	Incapacitated
Robert of Burgate			~1170–1220	1. Household Knight; 2. Kings Paymaster in Ireland; 3. Commander; 4. Castellan of Dover Castle (1211–1213); 5. Co-Custodian of Framlingham Castle (1216); 6. Custdian of the Archbishopric of York (Briefly); 7. Custodian of Knaresborough (Briefly); 8. Diplomat to Otto I, Duke of Brunswick-Lüneburg	Unknown
Robert of Ropsley			~1170–1230	1. Diplomat to Otto I, Duke of Brunswick-Lüneburg; 2. Castellan of Kenilworth Castle 1207–1210; 3. Custodian of the Honour of Leicester (1205–1209); 4. Household Knight	Traitor
Thomas Sturmy			~1170–1230	1. Custodian of the See of Chichester (1208–1209); 2. Member of the Kings Buttery (1213–1215); 3. Custodian of the Abbey of Hide; 4. Household Knight	Unknown
Oliver de Vaux			~1180–1244	1. Baron Dalston	Traitor from 1215
Robert of Thornham			~1170–1211		Dead before War
Simon of Pattishall			~11170–1217		Loyalist
Gérard d'Athée			~1170–1220	1.Mercenary Captain	Loyalist
Henry of Braybrooke			~1180–1234		Traitor
Gerard de Canville			~1150–1214		Loyalist
William of Wrotham			~1170–1217		Traitor
Brian de Lisle			~1180–1234	1. Custodian of the Manors Girton, Cambridgeshire & Barton, Cambridgeshire from 1204; 2. Household Knight	
Renaud de Pons (seneschal of Gascony)			~1170–1228		Probably Loyalist
William de Beauchamp (1185)			1185–1260		Traitor; reconciled

Under Henry III of England:

Name	Coat of arms	Relations	Lived	Lands/Offices/Functions	Loyal to Henry in the 2nd Barons war?
Bertram de Criol			~1190–1256	1. Constable of Dover, Keeper of the Coasts, Lord-Warden of the Cinque Ports; 2. Household Knight of Hubert de Burgh, 1st Earl of Kent; 3. Lord of the manor of Sarre; 4. Sheriff of Kent; 5. Constable of the Tower of London; 6. Keeper of the Receipts; 7. Steward; 8. Diplomat	Died Before War
Stephen de Segrave			1171–1241	1. Chief Justiciar of England (1232–1234); 2. Household Knight; 3. Constable of the Tower of London (1220); 4. Intermittently High Sheriffs of Hertfordshire & Essex (1221–1223), Lincolnshire (1222–1224), Bedfordshire and Buckinghamshire (1228–1234), Warwickshire (1229–1234), Leicestershire (1229–1234), & Northamptonshire (1229–1234); 5. Co-Castellan of Beeston Castle & Chester Castle (1236)	Died Before War
Nicholas de Moels			~1195~1269	1. Seneschal of Gascony; 2. Household Knight	N/A
Henry de Turberville			~1180–1239	1. Seneschal of Gascony (1227–1230, 1234–1238); 2. Household Knight; 3. Commander	Died Before War
Roger de Leybourne			1215–1271		Helped in the Original Arrest of the Bishop of Hereford which started the war, but switched sides and remained loyal to the king
Richard de Montfichet			~1200–1267	1. Baron of the Exchequer	N/A
Drogo de Barentyn			~1210–1265	1. Warden of Guernsey and Jersey; 2. Seneschal of Gascony	N/A
John de Havering			~1245–1309	1. Seneschal of Gascony; 2. Justiciar of Wales	N/A though his father was Steward for Simon de Montfort, 6th Earl of Leicester's estates.
John Maunsell			~1190–1265		Loyalist
John de Vaux			~1240–1288	1. Sheriff of Norfolk and Suffolk; 2. Justice Itinerant; 3. Kings Judge	Helped to Arrest the Bishop of Hereford along with de Montfort Partisans, but then switched sides to the king.
Philip Basset			1185–1271	1. Chief Justiciar (1261–1263)	N/A
Hugh de Vivonne			~1185–1249		Dead before the start of the war.
Thomas Moulton (knight)			~1175–1204		Dead before the start of the war
William Joynier			~1175–1248		Dead before the start of the war
Richard of Staines			~1185–1277		N/A
Henry of Bath			~1210–1260		Unknown
Robert of Lexinton			~1175–1250	1. Chief Justice of the Common Pleas (1236–144); 2. Warden of the Honour of Peak; 3. Itinerant Justice	Dead Before the Start of the war
Richard de Southchurch			~1235–1294		Loyalist, tried to burn London down by making Rooster's fly into the city while on fire
Martin of Littlebury			~1210–1274		Post-War Figure
Walter of Pattishall			~1200–1232		Probably Loyalist
Gilbert of Preston			1209–1274		Post-War Figure

Under Edward I:

Name	Coat of Arms	Lived	Relations	Lands/Offices/Functions
Walter de Beauchamp (Steward to Edward I)		~1242–1306	Younger brother of William de Beauchamp, 9th Earl of Warwick	1.Royal Steward 2.Lord of Powick, Beaumont's court, and
Walter de Merton		1205–1277		
John de Vaux		~1215–1268		
Ralph Sandwich		1235–1308		
Hugh de Turberville		~1240–1293	Vassal of Reginald FitzPiers	
Gunselm de Badlesmere		~1232–1301		
John Botetourt, 1st Baron Botetourt		1265–1324		
John St John (died 1302)		~1240–1302		
Marmaduke Thweng, 1st Baron Thweng		~1275~1315		
John de Bonvillars		~1215–1287		
Guillaume de Grandson		~1260–1335		
Gerard de St Laurent		~1240–1282		
Thomas Weyland		~1230–1298		
Ralph de Hengham		~1260~1330		
Henry de Cobham, 1st Baron Cobham		1260–1339		
Bartholomew Badlesmere, 1st Baron Badlesmere		1275–1322		
Luke de Tany		~1245–1282		
William de Cicon		~1250–1311		
William Bereford		~1260–1326		
Stephen de Rognon		~1260~1320		

== Other Nobles ==
Note: Since these nobles generally did not hold a title the dates which they are marked by is when they lived, not when the reigned.

Royal Relatives:
Name	Coats of arms	Lived	Title	Relation to Royalty & Job
Henry of Almain		1235–1271	Cornwall?	Son of Richard Earl of Cornwall, his wavering loyalties during the second barons war eventually resulted in his assassination in 1271 by Simon de Montfort the Younger and Guy de Montfort, Count of Nola.
Philip of Cognac		~1180–1230	Lord of Cognac	Bastard of Richard I of England
Meiler Fitzhenry		~1170–1220	Lord Chief-Justice of Ireland	Grandson of King Henry I through his illegitimate son Henry FitzHenry, Served as Lord Chief Justice of Ireland
Ralph Gernun				He was King John's Nephew
William Longespée the Younger		1212–1250	Sire	Crusader knight and Grandson of Henry II through his bastard son William Longespee
Stephen Longespée		1216–1260	Justiciar of Ireland, Seneschal of Gascony, Sire	A knight and Justiciar of Ireland, and seneschal of gascony who was a Grandson of Henry II through his bastard son William Longespee
Nicholas Longespee		~1220–1297	Bishop of Salisbury	A bishop of Salisbury 1291–1297 and a Grandson of Henry II through his bastard son William Longespee

Other Nobles:
Name	Coats of arms	Lived	Native Shire/County	Profession/Accomplishments
Giles de Argentine		~1220–1283	Normandy	Justice Itinerant 1253 & 1258, Constable of Windsor 1263, fought for the rebels at the battle of Evesham
Robert de Auberville		~1180–1245	Sussex	Justiciar in kent, keeper of the coast
Henry Audley		1175–1246	Staffordshire	Constable of Hugh de Lacey, apparently later a baron
John de Baalun		~1180–1235	Gloucestershire	Apparently a minor English baron who served as Justice itinerant
Guy de Balliol		1222–1265	Scotland	A knight who fought in the battle of Evesham on the rebel side.
John de Bayeux		~1190–1249	Lincolnshire	A nobleman, murderer, and justice itinerant
Stephen de Bayeux		~1200–1260	Lincolnshire	Brother & Heir of John de Bayeux
Eustace de Balliol, Sheriff of Cumberland		~1215–1274	Yorkshire	A nobleman, uncle of the king of Scotland, John Balliol, sheriff of Cumberland, governor of Carlisle castle and participant in Edward I of England's crusade.
William de Beauchamp (1185)		1186–1260	Bedfordshire?	A nobleman, judge, and high sheriff
Robert Bracey		1192~1270?	?	Disgraced former holder of high office who joined the rebel side and fought for the Rebels at the Battle of Evesham
John Botetourt, 1st Baron Botetourt		1265–1324	?	Upcoming nobleman serving as admiral in the 1290s
Geoffrey de Buckley		12??–1265	?	He was a rebel who was killed in the Battle of Evesham.
Thomas Butler, 1st Baron Dunboyne		1271–1329	Dublin?	He was the third son of the fourth Baron-Butler. He later came to be baron of Dunboyne by writ of summons in 1324
John Charlton, 1st Baron Charlton		1268–1353	Shropshire	At this point he was a young nobleman receiving his education at the king's court
Sir Peter Compton		(~1190–1230)	Devonshire	Lord of Compton Castle
John de Courcy		(1150–1219)	Normandy	He was an influential Anglo Norman knight who arrived in Ireland in 1176 as part of a group of mercenaries sent to conquer Ireland. He branched off on his own assembling a private army of 300 infantry and 22 knights. By working with Gaelic allies he was able to conquer large areas of land, by marrying the daughter of the king of the isles he was on his way to becoming a king himself. He built castles and founded religious houses, acting as de facto earl of ulster. However in 1204 (under the authority of the king of England) he was captured by the Lords of Meath on Good Friday when he was in church unarmed. He spent the rest of his life in prison
Nicholas de Crioll		~1220–1272	Kent	A knight who held at least 5 fiefs, briefly served as keeper of the coast, and was a member of the royal household listed as a valet
Hugh Despenser the Younger		~1287–1326	Hampshire	At this point he was a youth, possibly in the kings household
Sir John Deyville		1234–1291		An outlaw loyal to Simon de Montfort
Robert Deyville		~1236–12??		His brother
Adam de Everingham		~1225–1280	Yorkshire	Keeper of Sherwood Forest, lord of Everingham, Shelford, & Fairburn. Fought at the battle of Evesham for the rebels.
Robert de Everingham		~1190–1236	Yorkshire	Keeper of Sherwood Forest
Guy Ferre the Elder		?	?	?
Richard FitzJohn		~1245–1297	Surrey?	Knight who fought in Gascony and Wales, Leader of the garrison as Captain of Bourg during the siege led by Henry III de Sully, relieved by Simon Montagu, 1st Baron Montagu
Peter FitzReginald		~1275–1310	Wales?	Younger son of a Marcher lord. Lord of Chewton.
Reginald FitzReginald		~1275–1328	Wales?	Younger son of a Marcher lord. Lord of Hinton Martell.
Eustace Folville		~1288–1347	Leicestershire	He was a child of John Folville and would eventually go on to be a bandit
John Folville		~1255–1310	Leicestershire	He was a knight of the shire for Rutland
Maurice de Gaunt		~1180–1230	Gloucestershire?	Nobleman and knight who founded Beverston Castle in Gloucestershire under a royal license
Pierre I de Grailly		~1265~1315?	Gascony	He was the son of Jean ler de Grailly and viscount of Benauges.
Pierre II de Grailly		1285–1356	Gascony	Son of Pierre I de Grailly, at this point he was a child and a teenager but he would go on to become the Viscount of benauges
Hugh Gubyon		1222–1275	Durham?	He was taken prisoner by Roger Mortimer's army at Northampton. He fought for the king in Battle of Lewes and The Battle of Evesham proving himself a loyal royalist.
William Hardell		~1170–1220?	Middlesex?	Mayor of london and Magna Carta surety
Robert Holland, 1st Baron Holand		~1283–1328	Lancashire	At this point he was a young noble
Hugh de Hoyeville		1210–1265?	Hampshire	He was a rebel who complained to Henry III regarding the unfair inheritance of debt he suffered which may have been the reason for his support of Simon de Montfort, 6th Earl of Leicester. He fought in Battle of Evesham and probably died there.
Sir John Ingham		1260–1309	Norfolk	He served Edward I against the Scots
Roger de Leybourne		1215–1271	Oxfordshire?	English knight who took part in the second baron's war
John de Lilburn		1279-1355	Northumbria	Household knight, grandson of the II Baron of Westmoreland and possibly son of the above. Took part in the Earl of Lancaster's rebellion against Edward II in 1315-16. Pardoned, he became Constable of Dunstanburgh Castle in 1323, Commissioner of Array in Northumberland in 1325 and Sheriff of Northumberland from 1327 to 1329. As Supervisor of the Northern Ports he helped provide ships to defend against Isabella of France's invasion.
Jourdain de l'Isle		~1260–1323	Gascony	A Gascon Knight, founder of the town of Vianne, he was known for his foul temper and his violent acts against monks, merchants, and even nobles. He was the lord of Cazaubon, Cornillon, and Mongaillard Castle. He was accused of murder and rape along with theft and other crimes but avoided capture until 1326 when he was hanged.
Savari de Mauléon		1181–1236	Poitou	Ally of John, King of England and seneschal of Poitou for John, also part of the Regency council for Henry III of England
William Maltravers		?	?	An excellent knight who was favored by the king, apparently allowed some noble prisoners to escape after The Battle of Evesham, something of a chivalrous act
Adam de Mohaut		~1220~1265		He is credited with having recognized and saved Henry III of England in the onslaught following the Battle of Evesham
Amaury de Montfort (priest)		1243–1301	England?	Third son of Simon de Montfort 6th earl of Leicester, outlived his brothers
Henry de Montfort		1238–1265	England?	Son of Simon de Montfort 6th earl of Leicester, killed at the battle of Evesham
Peter de Montfort		1205–1265	Warwickshire?	Supporter of Simon de Montfort, Served as de facto "Speaker of the house of commons" under Simon's government
Simon de Montfort the Younger		1240–1271	England?	Second son of Simon de Montfort 6th earl of Leicester, died a fugitive having murdered Henry of Almain
Ralph de Monthermer, 1st Baron Montherme		1270–1325	Durham	At this point he was a squire for Gilbert de Clare, 7th Earl of Gloucester
Roger de Morteyn (predeceased his father)		~1240–1274	Bedfordshire	Elder son of Roger I de Morteyn who predeceased his father.
Robert de Morteyn		1227–12??	Bedfordshire	Nobleman, son of Eustace II de Morteyn
John de Morteyn		~1190–??	Bedfordshire	Nobleman
John de Morteyn (younger)		1230–1284	Bedfordshire	Nobleman, son of Eustace II de Morteyn
William de Morteyn		1197–??	Bedfordshire	Nobleman brother of
William de Morteyn (Knight)		1221–1283	Bedfordshire	Knight, son of Eustace II de Morteyn
Humbert de Pairaud		~1230–1280	England & France	Master of the knights Templar for England and France
Thomas Pinkeney		~1250–1300	Northamptonshire?	Relative of Robert de Pinkeney
Richard de Poncelis		~1200–1260	Gascony	He was a Bailiff who served under Henry de Turberville in Gascony and quarreled with Hugh de Vivonne in 1234 apparently having been deprived of his Bailiwick. He refused to surrender his office and the property of the office including armor, furniture, and other goods and received the protection of a cathedral. He was encouraged by his success in his defiance and tore down a tower of a royal castle to use the stones for his own tower. de Vivonne was forced to invoke the authority of the king in order to counter him and on 27 January the king ordered the archbishop of Bordeaux to surrender the rebel who was under his protection.
Walter Prouse		~1180–1200	Devon	Devonshire knight and lord of Gidleigh Castle
William de Ros of Helmsley		~1190–1240?	Yorkshire?	Son of Robert de Ros (died 1227), Lord of Helmsley, Rebel captured at the Battle of Lincoln (1217)
Henry le Scrope		1268–1336	England?	English nobleman, probably a squire (later a Lord-Chief Justice)
Barrau de Sescas		~1270–1325	Gascony	He was a Gascon Knight, vassal of Albret and a supporter of the English, he served as admiral of Bayonne fleet and captain of the coast
Richard Stapledon		~1260–1326	Devon	A knight, judge, and elder brother of Walter de Stapledon. In 1326 he died a valiant death trying to save his brother from an angry mob of Londoners.
Walter de Stapledon		1261–1326	Devon	At this point he was a young nobleman probably studying for his future ecclesiastical career.
Hamo le Strange		~1240~1272	Shropshire?	Crusader Knight who fought for Edward I of England at the Battle of Evesham
John Lestrange		~1190–1269	Shropshire	He was a knight who took part in John, King of England's failed campaign in Poitou, later he backed the King in the second barons war
Randulf de Talemont		~1200–1260	Gascony	He was probably a nobleman. He was responsible for holding onto lances, bows, targes, and crossbows out of the castle of Oleron. It required a special order from the king in order to convince him to surrender the arms.
Richard Trussel		1215–1265	Warwickshire	He was a rebel who fought alongside Simon de Montfort, 6th Earl of Leicester at the Battle of Lewes and later at the Battle of Evesham where he was killed and had his head chopped off.
John de Valognes		?	?	Lord of Orford
Hugh de Vere, 1st Baron Vere		~1270–1318	Kent?	The second son of Robert de Vere, 5th Earl of Oxford he served as a knight in gascony (1294–1297), and in Scotland (1299–1318)
Walter de Washington		1212–1264	Durham	A knight who died in Battle of Lewes

== See also ==
- List of nobles and magnates of France in the 13th century
- List of nobles and magnates within Scandinavia in the 13th century
- List of nobles and magnates within the Holy Roman Empire in the 13th century
