= Baron Lucy =

The canting arms of the Anglo-Norman de Lucy (or de Luci) family display three Esox lucius

Baron Lucy (anciently Lucie or Luci) is a title that has been created four times, three times by tenure and once by writ, which means that the peerages could descend through both male and female lines. The first creation by tenure came in the 12th century with Chief Justiciar Richard de Luci. In 1320, the title Baron Lucy was created in the Peerage of England by writ of summons dated 15 May 1320. The title Baron Lucy has been dormant since 1398.

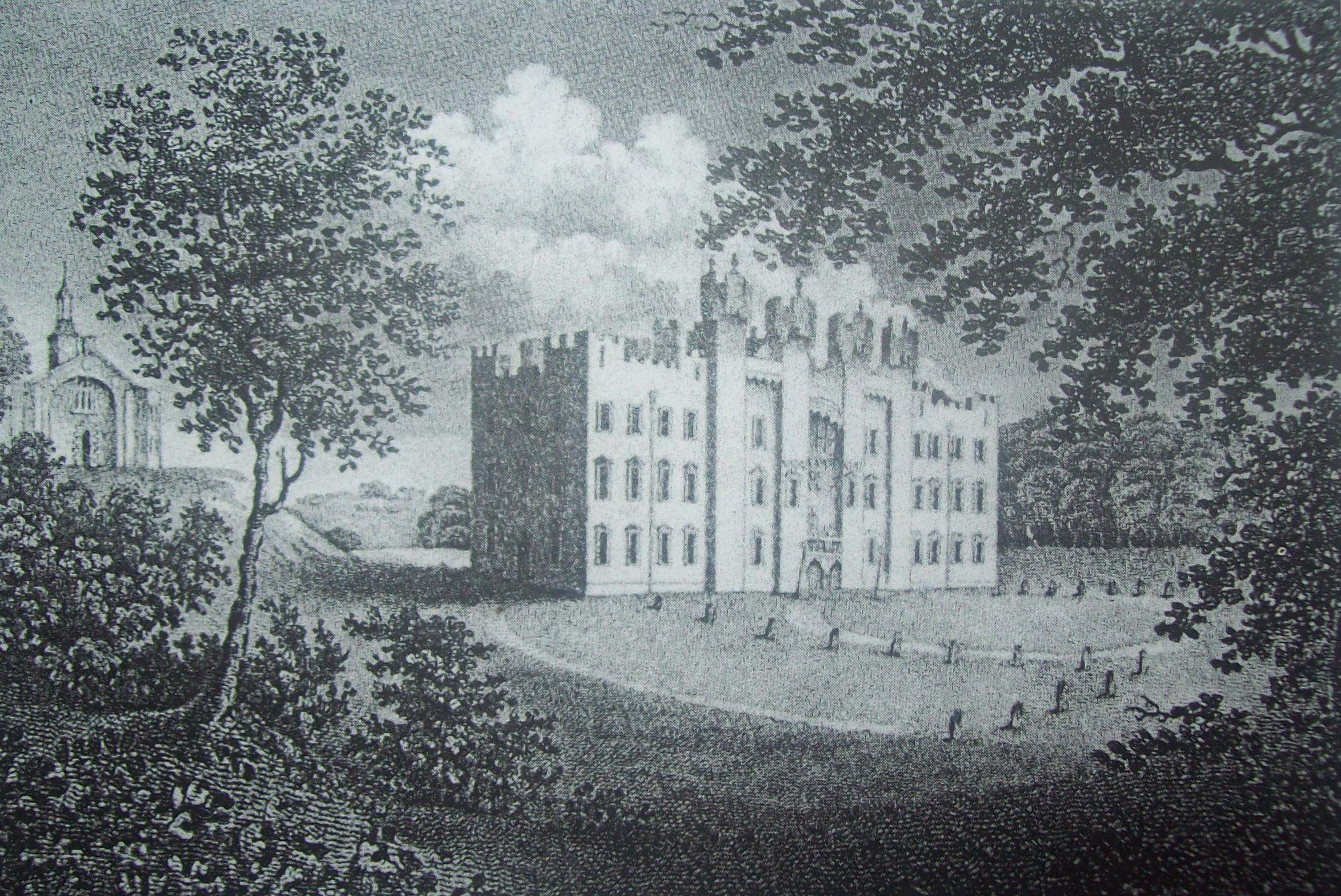
Hylton Castle and St Catherine's Chapel (on the left); unknown artist, c. 1800

== Barons de Lucy ==
=== Barons de Lucy (also Lucie or Luci) by tenure ===
- Richard de Luci, Governor of Falaise (Normandy), Lord of Diss, Chief Justiciar of England (died 1179)
- Richard de Luci, son of Geoffrey de Luci, 2nd and last Baron Lucy by tenure (died ante 1196)

=== Barons de Lucy/Luci (of Egremont) by tenure ===
- Reginald de Luci, Lord of Egremont (died ante 1199)
- Richard de Luci, Reginald's son, Lord of Egremont (died 1213)

=== Barons de Lucy (of Cockermouth) by writ (1320) ===
- Anthony de Lucy, 1st Baron Lucy (died 1343)
- Thomas de Lucy, 2nd Baron Lucy (Anthony's son; d. 1365)
- Anthony de Lucy, 3rd Baron Lucy (d. 1368)
- Joan de Lucy, 4th Baroness Lucy (daughter of Anthony, 3rd Baron; d. 1369 in infancy)
- Maud de Umfraville, 5th Baroness Lucy, Countess of Angus (sister of Anthony, 3rd Baron; d.1398). Following her death on 24 December 1398 the peerage passed to her nephew William Melton, 6th Baron Lucy of Cockermouth.
- William Melton, 6th Baron Lucy (son of Joan Lucy, younger sister of Anthony, 3rd Baron; d. 1398). This is listed as a continuation of the baronage following the death of Maud de Umfraville, 5th Baroness Lucy, Countess of Angus (younger sister of Maud and sister of Anthony, 3rd Baron; d.1398)
- John Melton, 7th Baron Lucy (died 24th May 1455)
- John Melton, 8th Baron Lucy (died 23rd Oct 1474)
- John Melton, 9th Baron Lucy (died 23rd Apr 1458)
- John Melton, 10th Baron Lucy (died 11th Jul 1510)
- John Melton, 11th Baron Lucy (died 26th Feb 1545). Following his death in 1545 his son-in-Law and Husband of his only Daughter Dorothy Melton, Baroness of Aston was called to parliament to be given the title of 1st Baron of Aston of which Melton Hall was renamed in respect of the new title. The Melton family had lived at this same residence as then was known prior to this as Melton Hall as there was no male heir of the 11th Baron Lucy of Cockermouth. His only daughter and child Dorothy brought the residence of Melton Hall in Aston-cum-Aughton, Yorkshire into the new baronage and hence continued to be passed down to the Barons of Aston. The residence hence became known as Aston Hall from this point. Aston Hall (Formerly Melton Hall burnt down in a fire in 1770 but was rebuilt in 1771-72.

== See also ==
- De Lucy

== Bibliography ==
- John Burke, A general and heraldic dictionary of the peerages of England, Ireland, and Scotland, extinct, dormant, and in abeyance, Henry Colburn & Richard Bentley, London 1831
- Nicholas Harris, William Courthope, The historic peerage of England, John Murray, London 1857
