= Henry de Pinkeney, 1st Baron Pinkeney =

Arms of Henry de Pinkeney, 1st Baron Pinkeney:Or, five fusils in fess gules.

Henry de Pinkeney, 1st Baron Pinkeney (died 1301), Lord of Weden-Pinkeney, was an English noble. He served in the wars in Scotland and was a signatory of the Baron's Letter to Pope Boniface VIII in 1301.

== Biography ==
Henry was a younger son of Henry de Pinkeney and Mary de Wahul. He succeeded to his brother's estates and titles upon the death of his brother Robert de Pinkeney in 1296. His brother Robert was a competitor for the Crown of Scotland in 1290, from their great-grandmother Marjorie, an alleged natural daughter of Henry, Earl of Huntingdon, son of King David I.

He died in 1301, without any issue. His will granted his lands to King Edward I of England.
