= Weedon Lois Castle =

Castle in Northamptonshire, England

Coordinates: 52.1182°N 1.1217°W

Weedon Lois Castle was a castle in the village of Weedon Lois, Northamptonshire, England. The castle was the caput baroniae of the barony of Weedon or Weedon Pinkeney.

A ringwork castle was constructed around the late 11th century by Ghilo of Picquigni, a Norman soldier. The surname was anglicised as Pinkeney, with the Pinkeney family holding the castle until the late 13th century.
