= Richard, Earl of Pembroke =

Richard, Earl of Pembroke may refer to

- Richard de Clare, 2nd Earl of Pembroke (1130–1176), Lord of Leinster, Justiciar of Ireland; Cambro-Norman leader in the Norman invasion of Ireland
- Richard Marshal, 3rd Earl of Pembroke (1191–1234), Lord Marshal of England
