= Robert de Pinkeney =

13th-century English noble

Arms of Baron Pinkney:Or, four fusils in fess gules.

Sir Robert de Pinkeney, Baron Pinkeney was a 13th-century English noble. He was a competitor for the Crown of Scotland and died in 1296.

Robert was the son of Henry de Pinkeney, Baron of Pinkeney, Lord of Wedon-Pinkeney and Mary de Wahull. He succeeded to his father's estates and titles upon the death of his father in 1277. Wedon-Pinkney is located in Northamptonshire, England. The family also had lands at Ballencrieff and Luffness in Lothian, Scotland.

Upon the death of Margaret, Maid of Norway, in 1290, Robert became one of the competitors for the Crown of Scotland, deriving his claim from his great-grandmother Marjorie, an alleged natural daughter of Henry, Earl of Huntingdon, son of King David I.

Robert died in 1296 and was succeeded by his brother Henry.
