= Lord of Skelton =

English title

The Lord of Skelton was a title in the Peerage of England held by:

- Robert de Brus (??-1141/1142)
- Adam I de Brus (1142-1167)
- Adam II de Brus (1167-1188)
- Peter I de Brus (1188-1222)
- Peter II de Brus (1222-1240)
- Peter III de Brus (1240-1272)
