= Battle of the Curragh =

Battle of the Curragh Irish: Cath an Churraigh
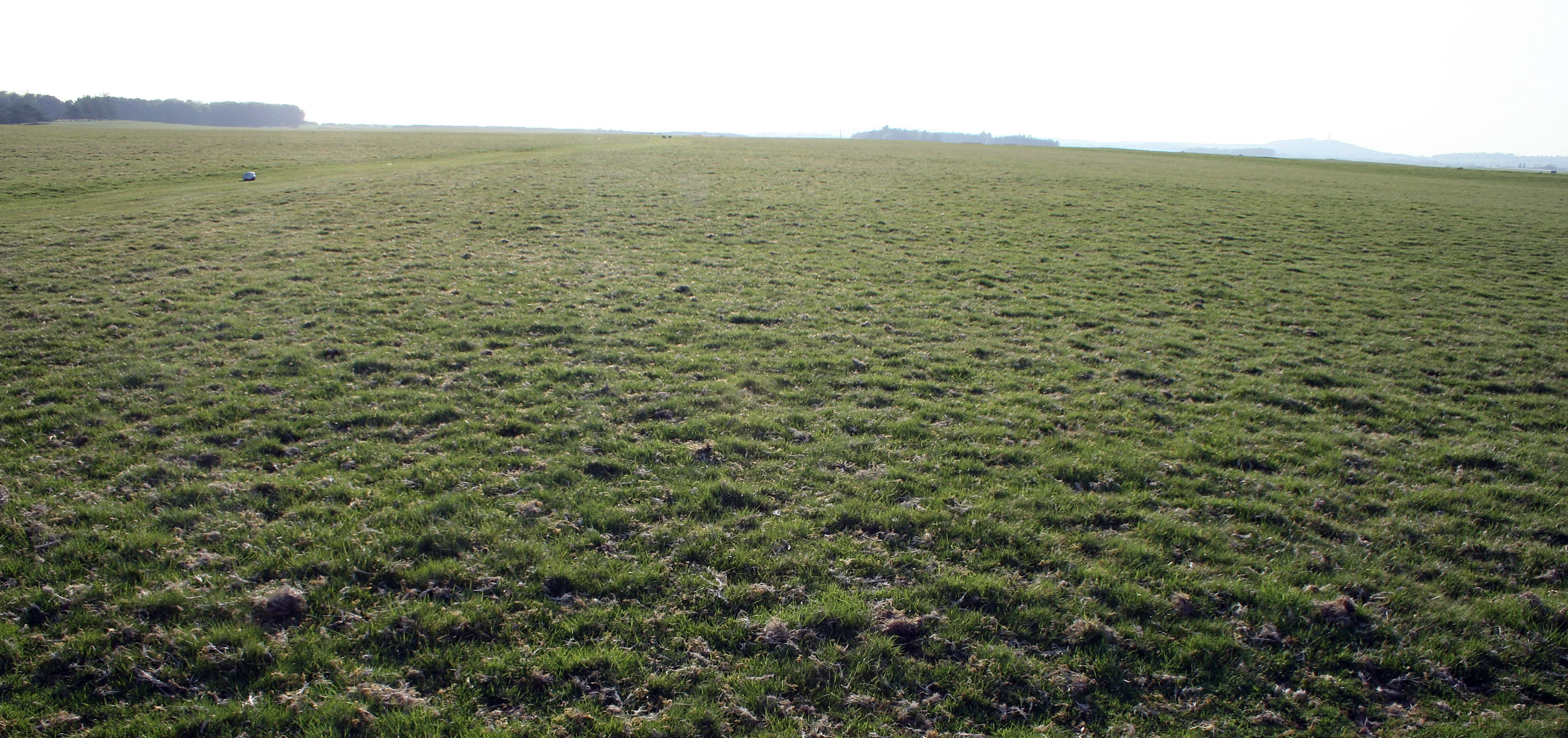
- The Curragh plains
| Date | 1 April 1234 |
| Location | The Curragh, Ireland |
| Result | Royalist victory |

Belligerents
| (Lordship of Ireland) Royalist forces | Richard Marshal's rebels |

Commanders and leaders
| Lord Offaly; Lord Meath; Earl of Ulster | Earl of Pembroke |

Strength
| 140 Knights | 15 Knights |

The Battle of the Curragh (Irish: Cath an Churraigh) was fought on 1 April 1234 on the Curragh plain in County Kildare, Ireland. The adversaries were men loyal to King Henry III of England on one side, and on the other side Richard Marshal, Earl of Pembroke and Lord of Leinster, who lost the battle and later died from the wounds he suffered. The battle was a small affair in the number of knights involved, but was still significant because it ended the career of the popular Richard Marshal.

The conflict between Richard Marshal and Henry III went back several years, and centred particularly on the earl's discontent with the influence that certain foreigners held over the king. Most prominent among these was the Poitevin Peter des Roches, bishop of Winchester. In March 1234, a truce was reached between the king and Marshal, the condition of which was the removal of Peter des Roches from court. In the meantime, however, conflict had broken out in Ireland between Marshal's brothers and some of the king's supporters. These included Maurice FitzGerald, justiciar of Ireland, Walter de Lacy, Lord of Meath and Hugh de Lacy, Earl of Ulster. Richard Marshal crossed to Ireland to assist his brothers, where he met with the enemies at the Curragh on 1 April. Here he was defeated and captured. He was taken to his castle at Kilkenny, where he died from his injuries on 16 April.

Richard Marshal had become highly popular in England because of his fight against foreign influence at court, and for this reason the accounts of the battle were idealised and not necessarily reliable. According to contemporary accounts, he was tricked into meeting his enemies at the Curragh, and then deserted by his own forces. Rather than flee, he remained to fight against the odds, allegedly with only fifteen knights against 140. Marshal's popularity also meant that his death was mourned in England, while the Poitevins—who were rumoured to have instigated the Irish war—fell further into disregard. Henry III nevertheless rewarded Marshal's Irish opponents richly.

The Curragh plains were later used as a location to recreate the Battle of Stirling Bridge in Mel Gibson's 1995 film Braveheart.

== Sources ==
- Frame, Robin (2007). Oxford Companion to Irish History. Oxford: Oxford University Press. ISBN 978-0-19-923483-7.
- Power, D. J. (2004). "Marshal, Richard, sixth earl of Pembroke (d. 1234)". Oxford Dictionary of National Biography. Oxford: Oxford University Press. doi:10.1093/ref:odnb/18124.
- Powicke, F. M. (1962) [1953]. The Thirteenth Century: 1216–1307 (2nd ed.). Oxford: Clarendon Press.
- Brendan, Smith (2001). "Irish Politics, 1220–1245". In Michael Prestwich; Richard Britnell; Robin Frame (eds.). Thirteenth Century England VIII: Proceedings of the Durham Conference 1999. Woodbridge: Boydell. ISBN 0-85115-812-9.
