= Henry de Turberville =

13th-century English soldier

Turberville arms: Argent, a lion rampant gules, crowned or.

Sir Henry de Turberville (died 1239) was a noted English soldier and Seneschal of Gascony (1227–1230, 1234–1237 and 1238).

== Origins and early years ==
He was the son of Robert Turberville. In the latter part of King John of England's reign Trubleville had already gained a reputation as a famous soldier. He was loyal to John to the end. In the last year of that king's reign he was employed to pay soldiers at Rochester, and rewarded with forfeited lands, some of which were in Devon.

== Battle of Sandwich ==
Trubleville continued to be employed under Henry III of England. In 1217 he took a prominent share in helping Hubert de Burgh to win his victory over the French fleet commanded by Eustace the Monk in the Straits of Dover. Grants of land in Wiltshire, Suffolk, Lincolnshire, Bedfordshire, and Devon were now made to him.

== First Seneschalship of Gascony ==
Before 19 October 1226 Trubleville was appointed seneschal of Gascony, holding the post until 1231. The rule of the young Richard of Cornwall had distracted the country; and Trubleville's correspondence with Henry III shows him contending with want of money, a revolt in Bayonne, a conspiracy in Bordeaux, disputes with the viscount of Béarn, and unsettled relations with the French king. In June 1228 he was the chief negotiator of a truce with France signed at Nogent. He importuned the king to relieve him of his governorship; but Henry answered that he must retain it until the king himself visited Gascony. However, on 1 July 1231 Trubleville was superseded, and in 1232 he was again in England.

== Revolt of Richard Marshal ==
In 1233 Turberville distinguished himself in the Welsh war that resulted from the revolt of Richard Marshal, 3rd Earl of Pembroke. Carmarthen was besieged by Rhys Grug and the Welsh forces who had risen in the interests of the Marshals. Turberville took a force of soldiers on shipboard from Bristol and sailed up the River Towy to the beleaguered castle and town. The bridge over the river, which was immediately below the castle, was held by the Welsh rebels. Turberville broke the bridge by the impact of his ship and captured its defenders or immersed them in the river.

== Second Seneschalship of Gascony ==
Turberville was reappointed seneschal of Gascony on 23 May 1234, and was ordered to be at Portsmouth by Ascensiontide to command a force destined to help Peter, Count of Brittany. He was expected to bring four other knights with him to Portsmouth. The writ of summons survives and reads;

"Henry king of England, etc., greets his beloved and faithful Henry de Turberville. We send you this instruction, asking that, as you love and honor us, you be at Portsmouth with four other knights promptly at the feast of the Ascension in the eighteenth year of our reign (June 1, 1234). Depart fully equipped with horses and arms to cross the sea to the aid of the count of Brittany and ready to remain in our service as the said count may more fully instruct you on our behalf, so that we may owe you our gratitude"

He fought actively in this cause, but Peter proved faithless, and Turberville was soon again in Gascony. He was seneschal, with a short break in 1237, until the end of November 1238.

== Sent to Help Frederick II ==
After Easter 1238 Turberville was sent by Henry III at the head of an English force destined to help his brother-in-law, the Emperor Frederick II, against the rebellious Lombards. He was subsequently joined by William, bishop-elect of Valence, Queen Eleanor of Provence's uncle, who seems to have assumed the command. They fought successfully for the whole summer against the Lombards. A victory over the citizens of Piacenza was won on 23 August. They were recalled before the renewal of Frederick's excommunication. The emperor testified by letter his great obligations to Turberville.

== Death ==
Turberville returned to England, and on 12 November 1239 was one of the numerous band of nobles who, headed by Richard of Cornwall, bound themselves by oath to go on crusade. He died, however, on 21 December 1239.

== Family ==
Turberville had a wife named Hawise, who survived him, and had her dower assigned from his Devon estates. He also left a daughter named Edelina, who married a Saintongeais named Elie de Blénac. Grants of money and kind from the Bordeaux exchequer were bestowed on her after her father's death. She was apparently illegitimate: the Melcombe estates of her father went to the Binghams through Lucy, Henry's sister, who married into that family.

== Notes ==
Attribution

This article incorporates text from a publication now in the public domain: "Turberville, Henry de". Dictionary of National Biography. London: Smith, Elder & Co. 1885–1900.
