= Peter de Maulay =

13th-century English baron and sheriff

Sheriff of Dorset and Somerset
- In office 1216–1221

Sheriff of Northamptonshire
- In office 1236–1236

Personal details
- Died: 1241 probably the Holy Land
- Spouse: Isabella
- Children: Peter de Maulay; Robert; Stephen; Hilary

Peter de Maulay or Peter de Mauley (Note: Another name was Peter de Malo Lacu.) (died 1241) was a nobleman and administrator who was one of King John of England's "evil counsellors". First appearing in the historical record in 1202, Maulay was in England by 1204 and serving as an official of John. During the rebellions of the end of John's reign, Maulay supported the king and was given custody of the king's younger son as well as important prisoners. Maulay continued to serve the new king, Henry III, after 1216 but ran into difficulties with the young king's regents and was accused of treason in 1221. Maulay was cleared of the charges, but retired to his lands in late 1221. In 1223, Maulay's lands at Upavon were confiscated by the king but were returned within a few months. Upavon was again confiscated in 1229 and given to another noble, but in 1233 King Henry regranted the manor to Maulay, an event which led to a revolt by Richard Marshal, the Earl of Pembroke, against the king. In 1241, Maulay went on crusade, and died late that year, probably in the Holy Land.

== Early life ==
Maulay's parentage is unknown, but he originated from the Maulay region in Poitou. He appears to have had a younger brother named Aimery, who possibly was the same as an Aimery de Maulay who owned lands in Quinçay and La Rochelle between 1218 and 1259. In a monastic chronicle, Peter is said to have relinquished his lands in France to Aimery in 1204, after the overlordship of the lands passed from King John of England to King Philip II of France. Peter's first appearance in the historical record was in 1202, when he received land around Loudun in exchange for Moncontour. Under John, he was appointed an usher in the king's household, where he soon became a close advisor of the king. He was considered one of the "evil counsellors" of John by the chronicler Roger of Wendover.

After John's loss of Normandy, Maulay went to England and was given the manor of Upavon in Wiltshire. His grant of the manor was at the king's pleasure, because the manor, which had been held by a noble who forfeited his land in England by staying in Normandy after its loss, would need to be restored to its rightful holder if John recovered Normandy. He served as an envoy to Rome in 1213 and in 1214 was in command of royal forces at La Rochelle in France. In 1214 he married Isabella, the daughter and heiress of Robert of Thornham. Robert had died in 1211, so through his wife, Maulay acquired the Barony of Mulgrave in Yorkshire. Maulay paid the king 7000 marks as a fine for the right to marry Isabella, one of the highest fines paid for the right to marry under John. (Note: A higher one was the 20,000 marks offered by Geoffrey de Mandeville to marry Isabella of Gloucester, John's ex-wife, which also occurred in 1214. Isabella was heiress to the earldom of Gloucester.) According to the medieval chronicler Ralph of Coggeshall, Maulay was the murderer of John's nephew Arthur of Brittany.

When the barons of England revolted against John in 1215, Maulay was given command of Corfe Castle by John. Along with Corfe, Maulay was given custody of John's younger son, Richard of Cornwall. He was also given Gomshall in Surrey. In 1216 he was given the office of Sheriff of Dorset and Somerset, where he made a name for himself with his exactions and heavy profiteering. Besides the custody of Richard of Cornwall, Maulay was also responsible for supervising the confinement of John's niece, Eleanor of Brittany, who, as elder sister of Arthur, had a strong claim to the English throne and had been held captive since 1202. At times, he was also responsible for keeping John's wife, Isabella of Angouleme and his heir, Prince Henry, safe from rebels, as long as they were at Corfe.

== Under Henry III ==
Maulay remained in office under the new king, Henry III, who succeeded to the throne in late 1216. While at Corfe, he had custody of William of Lancaster, who had been captured by the royalist side at Rochester in 1215. Ranulf de Blondeville, the Earl of Chester, attempted to secure William's freedom but was rebuffed by Maulay, leading the earl to threaten to depart England and the king's cause and go on crusade. (Note: William of Lancaster was eventually freed, but in 1217 was still paying on his ransom. At that point, he still owed over 2000 marks and was petitioning the government to persuade Maulay to allow installment payments on the ransom.) In early 1217 Maulay was ordered by the regent, William Marshal, to surrender control of Sherborne Castle and Somerset to William Longespee, the Earl of Salisbury, to help secure the return of Longespee to the royal cause. But Maulay refused to do so. In October 1217, Maulay was summoned to the royal court to answer charges that he had waged a private war against the earl over control of Somerset and that he had broken a truce that had held between the two men. The dispute was finally solved in February 1218 when Maulay was confirmed by the regent as custodian of Sherborne Castle and in the office of Sheriff of Somerset. Maulay compensated Longespee for his loss with a payment of 500 pounds, and a further payment of 1000 pounds by the government and custody of a royal ward.

Maulay received a total of 6561 marks by 1221 from ransoms paid by 16 prisoners he held at Corfe. (Note: This included 1850 pounds from William of Lancaster.) He also paid nothing into the Exchequer from Somerset or Dorset for the period from 1218 to 1220, with the total owed to the government amounting to a bit over 1500 pounds. (Note: This number did not include any expenses or other allowances that would have been credited to Maulay, because Maulay did not actually do a complete accounting for his time in office.) Maulay's extortions, however, led to him losing custody of Richard of Cornwall in 1220.

Maulay brought Richard of Cornwall to London to attend his brother's second coronation, which occurred on 17 May 1220.

== Treason accusations ==
On 20 May 1221, Maulay was accused of treason by Richard Mucegros and Hubert de Burgh before the king. The specific crime was alleged to be a plot to hand over Eleanor of Brittany, still held at Corfe Castle, to King Louis IX of France. Maulay was imprisoned for a short time, but on 4 June was released after surrendering Corfe to the king. He was allowed to retain his sheriffdom. The accusation may have owed more to the fact that Maulay had recently taken Mucegros' lands into custody because Mucegros had failed to make a payment due for a royal fine. The event may also have been used by de Burgh as an opportunity to weaken Peter des Roches, Maulay's patron and de Burgh's rival, while des Roches was out of England, by taking Corfe from one of des Roches' primary supporters. In July, Peter des Roches returned to England and, in late July, was instrumental in clearing Maulay of the charges. Maulay was not given back custody of Corfe, but on 29 July the royal government discharged the 7000 marks that Maulay still owed for his marriage fine. The stated reason for the release of this debt was to compensate Maulay for his expenses while controlling Corfe, but the real reason appears to have been to compensate for its loss. In late 1221 Maulay agreed to go on crusade with Peter des Roches and Falkes de Breauté, another of des Roches supporters. The loss of the city of Damietta in Egypt in September meant that the three men postponed their departure, and in November 1221 Maulay was replaced as sheriff. In return for Maulay's agreement to the ouster, the Exchequer wrote off more debts that Maulay owed the government, this time over 8800 marks. Maulay retired to his lands in Yorkshire.

== Upavon case ==
In February 1223, Maulay forfeited Upavon to the king. This was part of a string of confiscations that struck at supporters of des Roches, including William de Cantilupe, Breauté, and Robert de Vieuxpont, by taking back grants that had been made earlier and which were held at the king's will. The seizures were made to teach the nobles a lesson and curb their dissension from the royal government, which was in the hands of Roches' rival de Burgh. Most of the manors, including Upavon, were returned to their previous holders in April after a settlement between de Burgh and those who resented his government. Around this time, Maulay began work on Mulgrave Castle, in Yorkshire, which was part of his wife's inheritance. In June and July 1224, Maulay was present on the royal side at the siege of Bedford Castle, which was held by de Breauté against the government. (Note: The castle surrendered on 15 August 1224.) In 1225, Maulay claimed that he had sworn to King John that he would not give up custody of the royal castles until after John's son came of age. Maulay lost Upavon to the king again in 1229, with the king regranting Upavon to Gilbert Basset. This grant to Basset was by charter, with the lands to be held in fee. Maulay claimed that he only gave up his tenure because of threats by de Burgh.

Maulay returned to royal service in 1230 (Note: Maulay had last witnessed a royal charter in 1227.) when he joined the royal expedition to Brittany and was once more at the royal court in 1232 as a follower of Peter des Roches. Maulay regained Upavon in 1233, after the king reopened the case. Henry justified his action as being exercised "per voluntatem nostrum", or through his own will. Henry opened a case of quo warranto and then declined to recognise his own charter as valid, thus granting the manor to Maulay. Although the case could be made that Maulay's right to the manor was better than Basset's, it is more probable that the dispute over Upavon and its ownership was the opening move in an effort to curtail the influence of Richard Marshal, the Earl of Pembroke. It was also an attempt to turn back grants made by the king to de Burgh's supporters, now that de Burgh had fallen from power. The royal actions led to conflict between Henry III and the barons, because of Henry's grant of the manor to Basset. The restoration to Maulay and Basset's deprivation were considered illegal by many of the nobles and led to a revolt by Basset and Marshal, who was Basset's overlord. Maulay was seen as a non-Englishman who was profiting over a popular English noble, Basset. Maulay was briefly in disgrace but managed to return to favour, and was named constable of Devizes Castle in January 1234, his first royal appointment since 1221. He was granted the office of Sheriff of Northamptonshire in 1236, perhaps owing these offices more to his former ward, Richard of Cornwall, than to his patron des Roches, who fell from power in 1234. Des Roches' loss of power did not adversely affect Maulay's royal service. Maulay was present at the baptism of Prince Edward, and was one of the nobles who raised the infant from the baptismal font.

== Last years and legacy ==
Maulay had vowed to go on crusade in 1220, and in 1241 he finally set out for the Holy Land, along with Richard of Cornwall. Maulay died later in 1241, probably while still in the Holy Land. (Note: He was dead by 21 December.) His wife died before him and his heir was his son Peter de Maulay. Besides his heir, Maulay had two other sons, Robert and Stephen, and a daughter, Hilary, who married Piers de Brus, son and heir of Piers de Brus, the Lord of Skelton. (Note: Hilary's brother Peter married Joan, a daughter of Piers de Brus the elder.) Maulay had endowed a chantry at Meaux Abbey in Yorkshire in memory of his wife. He also confirmed grants of lands to Eskdale Priory, a Grandmontine house founded by Isabella's father, and to Nostell Priory. Maulay was also a benefactor of the Knights of Saint Thomas, a military religious order for Englishmen.
