= Thomas Moulton (knight) =

English landowner, knight, and judge (d. 1240)

Sir Thomas Moulton, Moleton, Muleton, or Multon (died 1240), also recorded as Thomas de Moulton, Thomas of Moulton, etc., was an English landowner, knight, and judge during the reigns of King John and King Henry III. From a family with landholdings in the south of Lincolnshire, he was the son and heir of Thomas Moulton (died before 1198) and his wife Eleanor Boston. After initial military service, he became a senior judge and held important government positions, in the process extending his inherited estates and accumulating considerable wealth.

== Career ==
As a knight, he served in King John's forces in the Normandy campaigns of 1202–04, against Llywelyn the Great in Wales in 1211 and in Poitou in 1214. In between, he obtained administrative posts, becoming sheriff of Lincolnshire from 1205 to 1208 and serving on royal enquiries in 1213 and 1214. Siding with the rebels when civil war broke out in the First Barons' War in 1215, he was captured by the king's forces at Rochester and imprisoned at Corfe Castle. His lands were forfeited and he was excommunicated. However, he made his peace with the new regime in 1217 and in 1218 was appointed an itinerant justice in the five northern counties. From 1224 to 1236 he served as a justice at Westminster, ending as the senior justice of the common pleas. At the same time, from 1233 to 1236, he was sheriff of Cumberland and constable of Carlisle Castle.

== Family ==
Before 1200 he married Sara, daughter of Richard Fleet (from Fleet in Lincolnshire), who was dead by 1218 after they had had three sons and a daughter:

- Lambert de Multon (died 1246), married Mabel Lucy, sister of Alice, he and his wife eventually acquiring the barony of Egremont in Cumberland.
- Alan de Multon, married Alice Lucy, he and his wife receiving half the honour of Papcastle in Cumberland.
- Thomas, a cleric.
- Juliana de Multon, in 1209 married Robert Vavasour.

In 1218 he married Ada, who was the daughter of Hugh Morville of Burgh by Sands in Cumberland, the widow of Richard Lucy of Egremont and the mother of Alice and Mabel Lucy, his daughters-in-law. They had one son:

- Thomas II de Multon (died 1271), married Maud Vaux, with her acquiring the barony of Gilsland in Cumberland.

Legal offices
Preceded by Martin of Pattishall	Chief Justice of the Common Pleas; 1229–1233	Succeeded by William de Raley
Preceded by William de Raley	Chief Justice of the Common Pleas; 1233–1236	Succeeded by Robert of Lexinton
Honorary titles
Preceded by Unknown	High Sheriff of Lincolnshire; 1205–1208	Succeeded by Unknown
Preceded by Unknown	High Sheriff of Cumberland; 1233–1236	Succeeded by Unknown
