= John Melton =

English merchant, writer and politician (died 1640)

Sir John Melton (died 1640) was an English merchant, writer and politician.

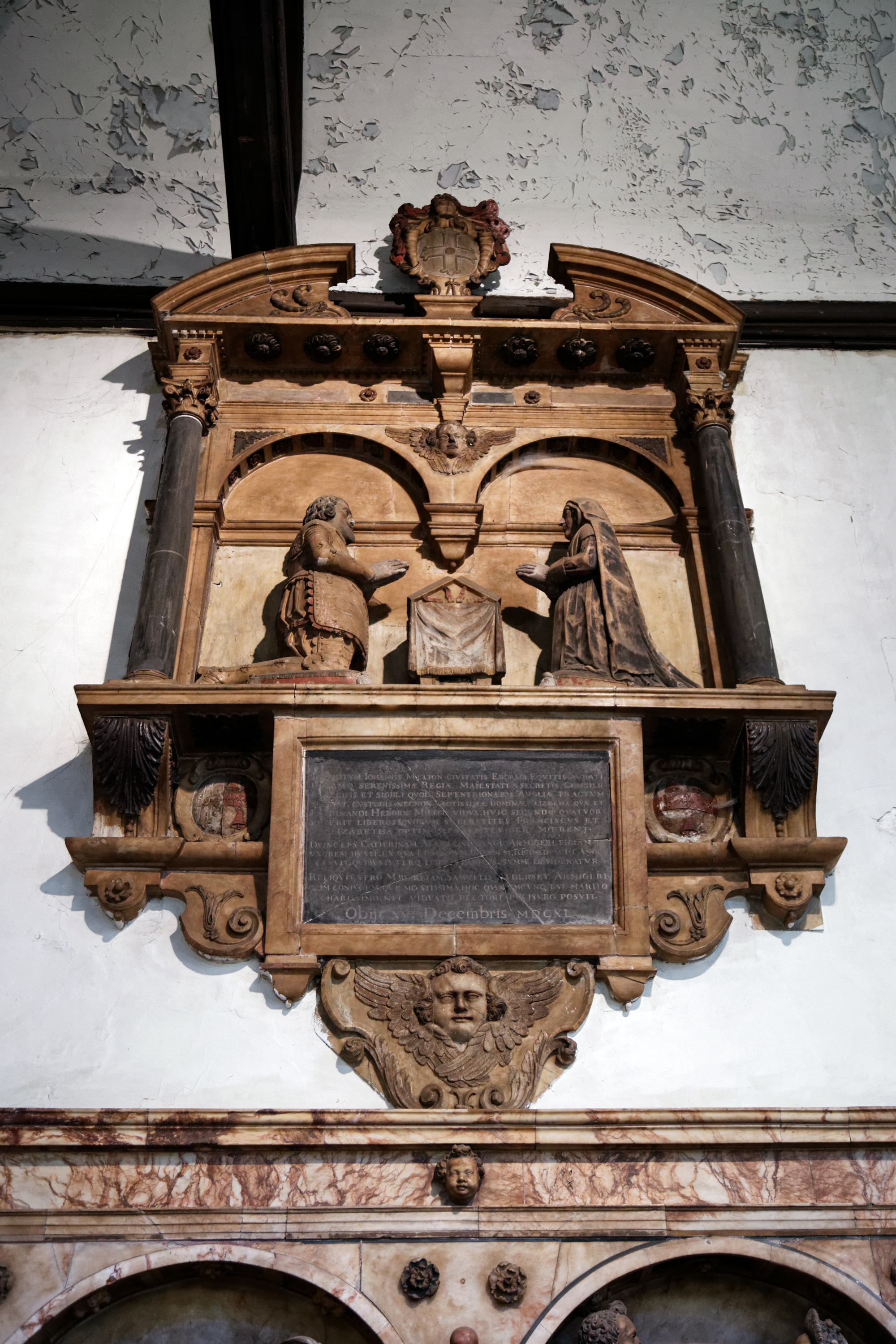
Monument to Sir John Melton in All Hallows Church, Tottenham

Melton was appointed Secretary to the Council of the North in 1635, by Charles I of England. He was elected Member of Parliament for Newcastle-upon-Tyne in the year of his death; it is unknown whether he has a connection to the Melton line of Aston, several members of which held the position of Lord Lucy.

Melton's works include A Six-Folde Politician (1609), and the satirical play Astrologaster (1620), against astrologers.

== Sources ==
- "Melton, John" . Dictionary of National Biography. London: Smith, Elder & Co. 1885–1900.
