= Alan de Multon =

- Died: 1256

Alan de Multon (died 1256), Lord of Papcastle, who held lands in Cockermouth, was an English noble.

He was the second son of Thomas de Multon and Sarah de Flete. His father paid one thousand marks to the crown for the wardship of the daughters and heirs of Richard de Luci and married them to his sons. Alan died in 1256 and was succeeded by his son Thomas.

== Marriage and issue ==
He was married first to Alice, daughter of Richard de Luci and Ada de Morville; they are known to have had the following known issue:

- Thomas de Multon, married Isabel de Botelby, had issue. Thomas assumed the name and arms of Lucy.
- Joan de Multon, married Ralph Dacre, had issue.
