= John de Bayeux =

English justice itinerant (died 1249)

John de Bayeux or de Baiocis (died 1249), was an English justice itinerant.

John was a son of Hugh de Baiocis, a Lincolnshire baron, by Alienora his wife. He had property in Bristol and Dorset, but in 16 and 17 John forfeited it on outlawry for murder. In 1218 he paid a relief of £100 and took possession of the family estates in Lincolnshire, and in the same year was judge itinerant for the counties of Cornwall, Devon, Somerset, and Dorset, along with "J. Bathon. et Glascon. Episc.."

The next year, an inquisition was held before the chief justice as to whether an appeal by Robert de Tillebroc against him, his mother, brother, and three others, was malicious. Nevertheless, in the great assizes of 1224–5, he was again itinerant justice in Dorset, and in the same year was also justice of forests and constable of the castle of Plympton. In 1234 he was charged with the homicide of Roger de Mubray, but on payment of 400 marks obtained leave to compound with the widow.

He died in 1249, leaving no male child, and his brother Stephen succeeded to his estates as heir.
