= Reginald FitzReginald =

13th-14th century English noble

Reginald FitzReginald (died 1328), also known as Reynold FitzReynold, Lord of Hinton Martell, was an English noble.

He was a younger son of Reginald FitzPiers and Joan de Vivonne. Reginald held from his mother, her share of the lands in Midsomer Norton, from William de Forz, her father. He was recorded as having fought at the Battle of Boroughbridge on 16 March 1322.

Reginald died in 1328, he was succeeded by his grandson Herbert from his second son.

== Marriage and issue ==
Reginald married Joan, the daughter and heir of Robert Martel. They are known to have had the following known issue.

- John FitzReginald, died without issue.
- Herbert FitzReginald (died 1318), married Lucy Peverell, had issue.

He married secondly Margaret, of whom little is known and thirdly Alice, daughter of John Cribbe. Alice later married to John Caunterel, after Reginald's death.
