= Peter III de Brus =

13th century English noble

Arms of Peter de Brus:Argent, a lion rampant, azure.

Peter de Brus (died 18 September 1272), Lord of Skelton, Danby, Kirkby, Constable of Scarborough Castle, was an English noble.

He was the son of Peter II de Brus and Hawise de Lancaster. Peter married Hillaria, daughter of Peter de Maulay, Lord of Mulgrave and Isabella de Thornham and died without issue on 18 September 1272. His properties were split between his sisters, Agnes, the wife of Walter de Faucunberge, Margaret, the wife of Robert de Ros, Ladereyna, the wife of John de Bellew, and Lucy, the wife of Marmaduke de Twenge. Agnes received Skelton, Marske, Upleatham and Kirkleatham. Lucy received Yarm, Danby and Brotton. Margaret received half the barony of Kendall. Ladereyna received Carlton and Kentmere.

== Bibliography ==
- Burke, John Bernard (1866). A Genealogical History of the Dormant: Abeyant, Forfeited, and Extinct Peerages of the British Empire. London: Harrison. OCLC 457204792.
- Hammond, Peter W. Complete Peerage or a History of the House of Lords and All its Members From the Earliest Times, Volume XIV: Addenda & Corrigenda, Sutton Publishing, Stroud, Gloucestershire, 1998.
