= Peter FitzReginald =

13th-14th century English noble

Peter FitzReginald (died 1310), also known as Piers FitzReynold, Lord of Chewton was an English noble.

He was a younger son of Reginald FitzPiers and Joan de Vivonne. Peter held from his mother, a share of Chewton, from William de Forz, her father. Peter was later able to purchase Chewton.

Peter died in 1322. He was succeeded by his grandson Herbert, by his eldest son, from his first marriage.

== Marriages and issue ==
Peter married firstly Ela, the daughter and co-heir of Roger Martel and Joan. They are known to have had the following known issue.

- Roger FitzPeter, also known as Martel, married Joan de Lorety, had issue.

He married secondly Alice, daughter and heir of Blethin Broadspere, Lord of Llanlowell. They are known to have had the following known issue.

- Herbert FitzPeter, married Margaret Walsh, had issue.

Peter married thirdly Maud (died 1349), of unknown parentage, without known issue. Maud remarried after Peter's death, Nicholas de Odecombe.
