= Lambert de Multon =

English noble

- Baron of Copeland
- Died: 1246

Lambert de Multon (died 1246) Baron of Copeland, Lord of Egremont, Lord of Moulton who also held lands in Fleet, Moulton and Sutton, was an English noble.

He was the eldest son of Thomas de Multon and Sarah de Flete. His father, paid one thousand marks to the crown for the wardship of the daughters and heirs of Richard de Luci and married them to his sons. Lambert died in 1246 and was succeeded by his son Thomas.

== Marriage and issue ==
He was married firstly to Amabil, daughter of Richard de Luci and Ada de Morville, they are known to have had the following known issue:

- Thomas de Multon
- Richard de Multon

Lambert married secondly Ida, widow of Geoffrey d'Oyry.
