= Reginald FitzPiers =

13th century English noble

- Arms of Reginald FitzPiers: Gules, three lions rampant or.

Sheriff of Hampshire
- In office 1261–1262

Personal details
- Died: 1286
- Spouse(s): 1. Alice de Standford; 2. Joan de Vivonia
- Parent(s): Peter FitzHerbert; Alice de Warkworth

Reginald FitzPiers (died 1286), also known as Reynold FitzPiers, Lord of Blenlevenny was a 13th-century English nobleman and Sheriff of Hampshire. He was the second son of Peter FitzHerbert and Alice de Warkworth, and following the death of his brother inherited the minor Marcher Lordship of Blaenllynfi from him.

== Life ==
FitzPiers was the second son of Peter FitzHerbert and Alice de Warkworth. He succeeded his brother Herbert FitzPiers upon Herbert's death in 1248. FitzPiers was ordered to march against the Welsh in 1258, and in 1260, was ordered to reside in those parts. During 1261, FitzPiers was made sheriff of Hampshire, and governor of Winchester Castle. In 1282, he participated in the campaign of King Edward I of England in Wales against Llywelyn ap Gruffudd. FitzPiers died in 1286.

== Marriage and children ==
Fitzpiers first wife was Alice, daughter and heir of William de Standford, they had the following known children:

- Lucia FitzReginald
- Katherine FitzReginald, married John Picard of Stradewy, had issue.
- John FitzReginald, a signatory of the Barons' Letter of 1301
- Beatrice FitzReginald

After de Standford's death Fitzpier married Joan, daughter and coheir of William de Vivonia and Maud de Ferrers, they had the following known children:

- Eleanor FitzReginald, married William Martin, 1st Baron Martin, had issue, and married Sir John de Mohun and had issue John de Mohun, 1st Baron Mohun.
- Alice FitzReginald
- Joan FitzReginald
- Reginald FitzReginald
- Peter FitzReginald
- Matthew FitzReginald
- William FitzReginald
- Isobel FitzReginald
