= Thomas Sturmy =

Thomas Sturmy was a 13th-century landowner, nobleman, and household knight for John, King of England.

== Origins ==
He was the younger son of Geoffrey Sturmy who held land from the king by Serjeanty. This family has its origins from the Norman Baron Richard Stirmud, although they had declined since then in wealth and power.

== Life and career ==
Geoffrey was likely a close associate to John, King of England when he was count of mortain (before he was king of England). This conclusion is reached from the fact that Sturmy had his lands confiscated temporarily for the part he played in the revolt against Richard I of England in 1194. He began his royal service as a squire in King Johns court.

He was given the custody of the lands of the bishopric of Chichester briefly in March 1208 – 1209. He was also given temporary custody of the Abbey of Hide along with the Breosa priories. Thomas played an important role in the service of the kings buttery. The kings buttery was a royal department responsible for the storage, transportation, and acquisition of barreled goods, primarily wine. It was headed by the Kings Butler (Bottler). From June 1213 to April 1215 Thomas acquired and transported wine for the kings use from various storage places. It is probable that Thomas Sturmy was awarded with money and food from his services in the buttery

== Family ==
He married Lucia, widow of Hugh de Montviron, probably with help from the king due to his royal services.
