= Reginald de Luci =

12th century English noble

- Died: 1198
- Noble family: Lucy family

Reginald de Luci (died 1198), also known as Reynold, was an English noble.

He was a son of William de Luci and Cecilia. He served as an itinerant judge in the Counties of Nottingham and Derby in 1173. He was governor of Nottingham Castle when it was captured by William de Ferrers, Earl of Derby in the rebellion against King Henry II of England, during 1174.

== Marriage and issue ==
Reginald married Amabel, daughter of William FitzDuncan and Alice de Rumilly, they are known to have had the following issue:

- William de Luci
- Reynold de Luci
- Richard de Luci of Egremont, married Ada de Morville, had issue.
- Cecily de Luci, married Roger de St. John, had issue.
- Alice de Luci
