= Walter de Fauconberg, 1st Baron Fauconberg =

13th-14th century English noble

Coat of arms of Walter de Fauconberg, Lord of Fauconberg, Or, a fess Azure, three pales in chief Gules.

Walter de Fauconberg, 1st Baron Fauconberg (died 1304), Lord of Rise, Withernwick and Skelton, was an English noble. He fought in the wars in Flanders and was a signatory of the Baron's Letter to Pope Boniface VIII in 1301.

== Biography ==
He was the eldest son of Piers de Faucomberg and Margaret de Montfitchet. He was summoned to parliament in 1295. Through his wife Agnes, he inherited the Barony of Skelton. He fought in the wars in Flanders and was a signatory of the Barons' Letter to Pope Boniface VIII in 1301. Walter died in 1304 and was buried at Nunkeeling Priory, Yorkshire.

== Marriage and issue ==
Walter married Agnes, daughter of Peter II de Brus and Hawise de Lancaster, they are known to have had the following known issue:

- Peter de Fauconberg, died young.
- Walter de Fauconberg, married firstly Isabel de Ros and secondly Alice de Killingholm, had issue.
- Frank de Fauconberg
- Peter de Fauconberg, a cleric.
- Alexander de Fauconberg, a cleric.
- John de Fauconberg, married Eve de Bulmer, had issue.
- Patrick de Fauconberg
- Avice de Fauconberg
- Lorette de Fauconberg
- Hawise de Fauconberg
- Agnes de Fauconberg, married Nicolas d'Engaine, had issue.

Peerage of England
New creation	Baron Fauconberg; 1295–1304	Succeeded by Walter de Fauconberg
