= Weedon Lois =

Village in Northamptonshire, England

Coordinates: 52.118°N 1.124°W

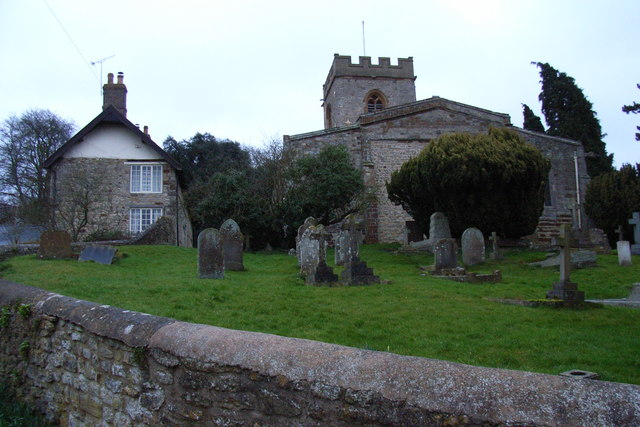
- SS Mary and Peter parish church

- Location within Northamptonshire
- OS grid reference: SP601470
- Civil parish: Weston and Weedon
- Unitary authority: West Northamptonshire
- Ceremonial county: Northamptonshire
- Region: East Midlands
- Country: England
- Sovereign state: United Kingdom
- Post town: Northampton
- Postcode district: NN12
- Dialling code: 01327
- Police: Northamptonshire
- Fire: Northamptonshire
- Ambulance: East Midlands
- UK Parliament: South Northamptonshire
- Website: Weston and Weedon Parish Council

Weedon Lois (or Lois Weedon) is a village and former civil parish, now in the parish of Weston and Weedon, in West Northamptonshire, England. It is about 5.5 miles (9 km) west of Towcester. In 1931 the parish had a population of 296.

== History ==
The villages name means 'Heathen temple hill'. There is a well in the parish, named after St. Loys or Lewis, whose waters apparently cured the Blind and Leprous.

Before Christianity came there may have been an Anglo-Saxon pagan temple here.

The oldest parts of the Church of England parish church of SS Mary and Peter date from about 1100. It is a Grade II* listed building. Michael Aris is buried in the churchyard, while the authors Edith Sitwell, her brother Sacheverell Sitwell, and American novelist James Purdy are buried in the churchyard extension.

On 1 April 1935 the parish was abolished and merged with Plumpton to form "Weston & Weedon".
