= Richard Marshal, 3rd Earl of Pembroke =

English nobleman

Richard Marshal
- 3rd Earl of Pembroke
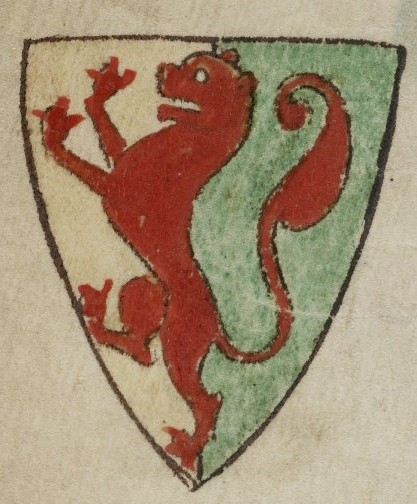
- Arms of Marshal by Matthew Paris: Party per pale or and vert, overall a lion rampant gules.
- Born: c. 1191
- Died: 15 April 1234; Kilkenny Castle
- Noble family: Marshal of Hamstead
- Spouse: Gervasia de Dinan (died 1238 or 1239)
- Father: William Marshal, 1st Earl of Pembroke
- Mother: Isabel, Countess of Pembroke

Richard Marshal, 3rd Earl of Pembroke (c. 1191 – 15 April 1234), was the son of William Marshal, 1st Earl of Pembroke and brother of William Marshal, 2nd Earl of Pembroke, whom he succeeded to the Earldom of Pembroke and Lord Marshal of England upon his brother's death on 6 April 1231.

== Early life ==
Richard was the son of William Marshal and his wife Countess Isabel, meaning that he was a member of the Marshal family. His father's biography calls Richard his 'second-born child' after his elder brother William Marshal the younger, who was born in 1190. Like all of Marshal's sons, he was educated to a high standard in the liberal arts. During his father's troubles in 1207 or 1208 with King John, Richard was demanded by the king as a hostage for his father. Though later liberated, he was required again by the king in 1212. He was knighted soon after by King John himself, and remained a knight in the king's household, accompanying the king on his expedition to Poitou in 1214, during which he had a serious bout of illness. Following the end of the Barons' War in 1216, he appears to have crossed over to France, and when news of his father's death reached the court of King Philip II Augustus of France in 1219, Richard was in the household of the French king. His placement there was no doubt because his parents had already determined he was to succeed to his mother's Norman lands, as was provided for in his father's last testament.

== Capetian Baron ==
Following his mother's death in March 1220, Richard Marshal came into her considerable Norman lands centered on the castles of Longueville and Orbec. However, his parents did not take the opportunity in their final dispositions to resolve the problem of the divided Marshal allegiance between the kings of England and France, as Richard was also allotted an English lordship of Long Crendon in Buckinghamshire. In June 1220, Richard and his elder brother met King Philip II at Melun where the king accepted the arrangement and took Richard's homage. Around 1222, Richard's links to France were increased by his marriage to the twice-widowed Gervasia de Dinan, heir to the eastern Breton lordship of her father Andrew de Vitré. Richard was able to use the marriage to secure control of Gervasia's claims to the manors of Ringwood in Hampshire and Burton Latimer in Northamptonshire. In 1230, on campaign in Brittany, Richard's elder brother, Earl William, for whatever reason, extracted from his friend King Henry III a promise that should he not survive the campaign the king would not resist Richard's succession to the Marshal English lands, despite his being a sworn man of King Louis of France. As it happened, the earl contracted an illness after his return from Brittany in 1231 and died childless on 6 April, leaving the earldom to Richard.

== Earl of Pembroke ==
King Henry III was as good as his word to the late earl and readily welcomed Richard Marshal into his court on his arrival in England on 25 July 1231. It was the new earl's bad fortune that his brother's death helped clear the way for King John's exiled favourite, Peter des Roches, bishop of Winchester, to return to England, and plot the downfall of the justiciar, Hubert de Burgh. One of the bishop's first victims on seizing power in 1233 was Gilbert Basset, one of the former followers of the late Earl William. Peter de Maulay, one of Des Roches's foreign followers, demanded a manor back which had passed in the meantime to Basset. The king backed Des Roches against Basset. When Basset resisted, the king abused him as a traitor and after a failed demonstration against the decision, Basset fled to the shelter of the southern March of Wales, where Earl Richard felt obliged to give his brother's ally shelter and adopt his cause. Richard was too suspicious to meet with the king at Gloucester in mid-August 1233 for requested peace talks, and the Bishop of St Davids, one of the earl's cousins, was sent by the king to add to the pressure by threatening to break off their relationship as lord and man. As temperatures rose, Richard was faced by demands from royal bailiffs in September for his garrison to surrender Usk Castle which it did. For a while, negotiations were attempted as the earl hesitated on the brink of open rebellion. But the die was cast in late September when Basset and his ally Richard Siward with what has to have been Earl Richard's consent made a spectacular cavalry raid across England, which at one point threatened London.

== The Marshal War ==
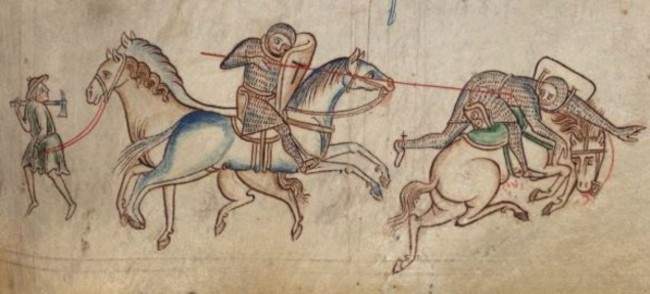
Richard Marshal portrayed by Matthew Paris as unhorsing Baldwin of Guines at a skirmish before the Battle of Monmouth in 1233

Earl Richard may have been hesitant about committing to open rebellion, but once the decision was made, he did what he could to win. He took the strategic decision to ally with Prince Llywelyn ab Iorwerth of Gwynedd, otherwise his family's long-term enemy. With Welsh support, in mid-October 1233, his army swept across South Wales, besieging and seizing the castles of Usk, Abergavenny, Newport and Cardiff in quick succession. Not all went well, however. According to the chronicler Roger of Wendover in his Flores Historiarum (Flowers of History), Marshal and his knights then came to Monmouth to reconnoitre the town before besieging it. However, they were seen coming towards the castle walls by Baldwin III, Count of Guînes. He was a nobleman of Flanders who, with his mixed force of Flemings and Poitevins, had been entrusted by King Henry with defending the town. The local lord, John of Monmouth, was absent from the battle. Baldwin wrongly thought that Marshal had only a few followers with him, and rode out with his forces to pursue him, but Marshal turned the tables. It was said of Marshal that he put up a gallant defence against Baldwin's men in this skirmish, but though his army repulsed Baldwin's forces the castle remained defiant. However, despite these local successes, Earl Richard failed to gain any wider support amongst his fellow earls and barons, and—apart from some daring mounted raids out of the March and deep into England—he did not have the resources or allies to carry the war to the king and his hated advisers.

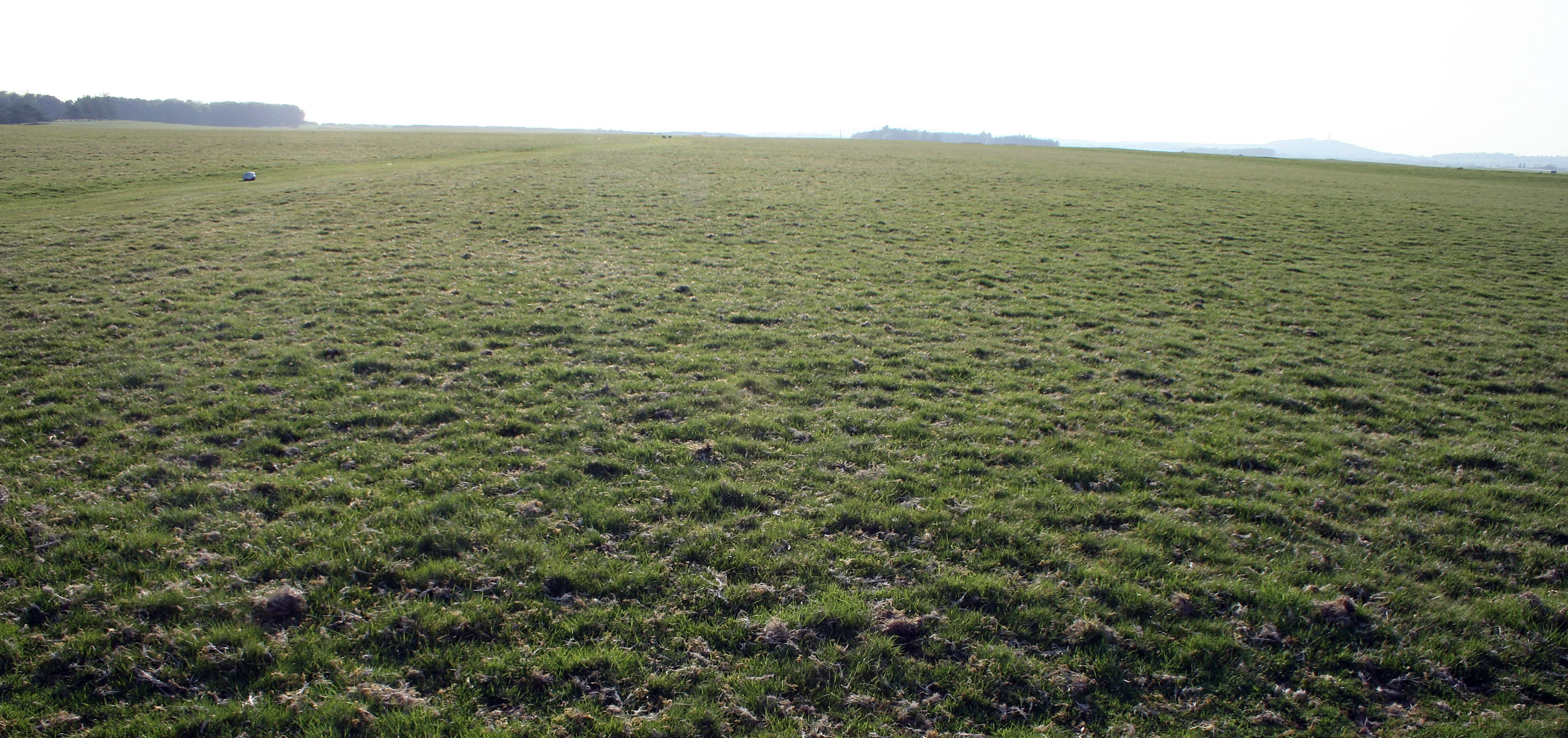
The Battle Plain of the Curragh outside Kildare

It may have been the stalemate in the war in England that persuaded Earl Richard to sail for Ireland on 2 February 1234, finding his province of Leinster to be loyal and committed. Here he found that his able younger brother, Gilbert Marshal, had managed since summer 1233 to institute a truce between his party and the king's justiciar Maurice fitz Gerald and his allies, the rival regional lords Walter de Lacy and Richard de Burgh. This appears to have frustrated the earl, but around mid-March, he seized the opportunity to attack de Burgh who had come out more strongly for the king, and so he organised a raid against him, in alliance with the Irish of the province of Thomond which alarmed the earl's enemies by taking several de Burgh castles in quick succession. De Burgh and de Lacy retaliated by their own rapid strike out of Meath which besieged the Marshal castle of Kildare. On 1 April 1234, Earl Richard and a small column of cavalry reached the siege lines on the Curragh. Attempted negotiations by the Templar brothers failed and in the succeeding mêlée the earl was cut off from his men, surrounded and unhorsed. He suffered a fatal wound during his capture. He lingered for two weeks but died of his injuries on 15 April 1234, while the justiciar and his allies subdued Leinster. Richard was buried in the Franciscan friary of Kilkenny. He was succeeded by his brother, Gilbert, at the time a clergyman, who had to deal with the aftermath of salvaging the Marshal fortunes and prosecuting the inevitable formal feud between his family and his brother's killers.

The death of Richard Marshal ended the long connection between the Marshals and their Continental lands, as his brother Gilbert did not succeed to them. Little is known subsequently of Richard's widow Gervasia, who died in 1238 or 1239. She was childless by him, though had several heirs from her two previous husbands.

== Sources ==
- Frame, Robin (2007). Oxford Companion to Irish History. Oxford: Oxford University Press. ISBN 978-0-19-923483-7.
- Power, D. J. (2004). "Marshal, Richard, sixth earl of Pembroke (d. 1234)". Oxford Dictionary of National Biography. Oxford: Oxford University Press. doi:10.1093/ref:odnb/18124.
- Daniel Power, 'The French Interests of the Marshal Earls of Striguil and Pembroke', Anglo-Norman Studies, 25 (2003), 199-25.
- Acts and Letters of the Marshal Family 1156-1248: Earls of Pembroke and Marshals of England, ed. David Crouch, Camden Society 5th series, 47 (Cambridge: CUP, 2015).
- Powicke, F. M. (1962) [1953]. The Thirteenth Century: 1216-1307 (2nd ed.). Oxford: Clarendon Press.

Political offices
Preceded by William Marshal	Lord Marshal; 1231–1234	Succeeded by Gilbert Marshal
Peerage of England
Preceded by William Marshal	Earl of Pembroke; 1231–1234	Succeeded by Gilbert Marshal
