= Richard de Luci of Egremont =

12th-13th century English noble

Richard de Luci
- Baron of Egremont and Copeland
- Arms of Baron de Lucy of Egremont: Gules, three lucies in pale argent, two and one.
- Died: 1213
- Buried: St Bees Priory
- Noble family: Lucy family

Richard de Luci (died 1213), sometimes spelt Lucy, Baron of Egremont and Copeland, was an English noble.

He was the third son of Reginald de Luci and Amabel filias Duncan. Richard inherited Egremont from his mother. He refused service to King John of England in 1201 and paid 15 marks scutage. Richard and his wife Ada were benefactors of the priories of St. Bees, Wetheral and Calder. He died in early 1213 and was buried in the Priory of St. Bees. Thomas de Multon, paid one thousand marks to the crown for the wardship of the daughters and heirs of Richard and married them to his sons. Multon also married Ada, Richard’s widow, without license and was required to pay £100 to the crown.

== Marriage and issue ==
Richard married Ada, daughter of Hugh de Moreville and Helewise de Stuteville, they are known to have had the following issue:

- Amabil de Luci, married Lambert de Multon, had issue.
- Alice de Luci, married of Alan de Multon, had issue.
