= Battle of Saint-Martin-Lalande =

Battle during the Albigensian Crusade

Battle of Saint-Martin-Lalande (1211)
- Part of the Albigensian Crusade
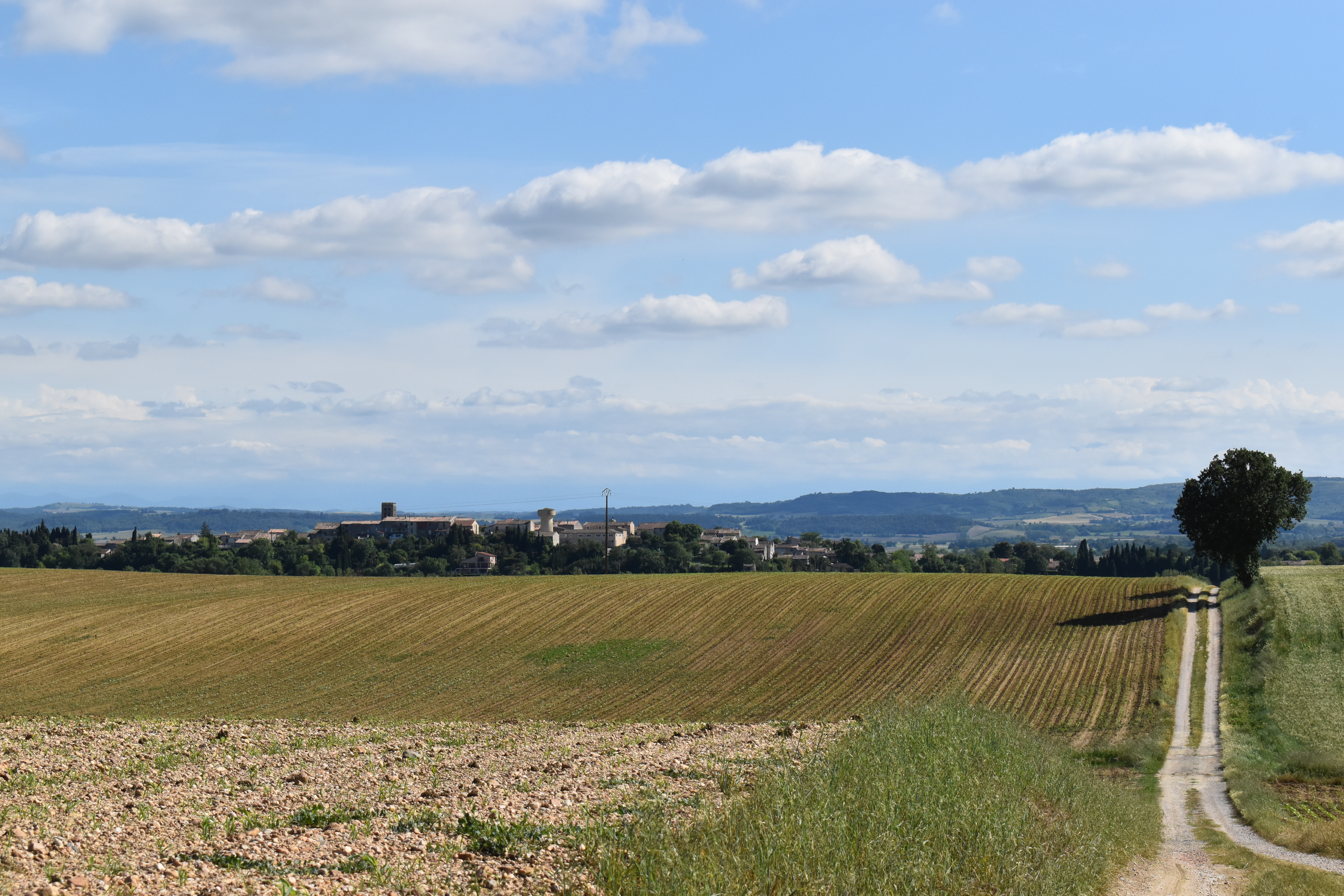
- Fields outside Saint-Martin-Lalande
Date	September 1211
Location	Saint-Martin-Lalande, Occitania
Result	Crusader victory

Belligerents
Crusaders	County of Foix

Commanders and leaders
Guy de Levis; Bouchard de Marly; Simon de Montfort	Raymond-Roger, Count of Foix

Strength
~750	~2000

Casualties and losses
Light	Heavy

The Battle of Saint-Martin-Lalande was a military engagement which took place in September 1211 during the Albigensian Crusade. The battle took place in the Occitania region of Southern France near the town of Saint-Martin-Lalande. A southern army led by Raymond-Roger, Count of Foix was defeated by a crusader army led by Guy de Levis and Bouchard de Marly.

== Background ==
In September of 1211 a southern army led by Raymond VI, Count of Toulouse besieged the crusader leader, Simon de Montfort, at Castelnaudary. The southern army numbered around 5000 men, and besieged the crusader garrison of about 500 knights and sergeants. During the siege Simon sent his marshal, Guy de Levis, to gather reinforcements and organize supplies for Castelnaudary.

Guy traveled to Narbonne to raise troops, but the citizens only agreed to fight if the viscount, Aimery, went with them. Aimery, who previously fought at the Siege of Minerve, refused and so Guy was only able to gather around 300 soldiers. Recruitment around Carcassonne raised another 500 men but most deserted. In Lavaur, Bouchard de Marly was able to recruit 100 knights and the Navarrese mercenary Martin Algai brought 20 knights with him. Bouchard and Martin travelled to Carcassonne and joined Guy where they escorted a supply train making its way to Castelnaudary. The supply train contained wine, biscuit, wheat, oats, and other supplies that were needed by Simon's besieged forces.

William Cat, a southern knight who was fighting for the crusaders at Castelnaudary, informed the southern army about the supply train and its location. Some of the southern nobles tried to ambush the supply train but the crusaders avoided this by taking an alternate route. As the supply train was nearing Castelnaudary, the Count of Foix gathered his forces to intercept the convoy. The other leading southern nobles and their troops present at the siege camp did not join him. Aware that a southern force was moving to intercept the convoy, Simon sent a detachment of 40 knights from Castelnaudary to join them. The next day, on the road between Saint-Martin-Lalande and Castelnaudary, the crusader convoy found the road blocked by the Count of Foix's army.

== Opposing sides ==
The crusader army was estimated to be no more than 750 men. This army was a combination of the several hundred recruits gathered by Guy de Levis, the 100 knights under Bouchard de Marly, the 20 knights under Martin Algai, and the 40 knights dispatched by Simon de Montfort. The army under the Count of Foix contained around 2000 men. The Count of Foix deployed his army into 3 formations. He placed his knights and heavy cavalry in the center, his light cavalry on one flank, and his infantry on the other flank. The exact formation of the crusader army is not known, though their main force was placed in the center to oppose the southern knights. Anxious as to the outcome of the battle, Simon de Montfort rode out of Castelnaudary with 50 or 60 mounted men, leaving only his infantry and 5 knights to hold the town.

== Battle ==
=== Account by Peter of Vaux-de-Cernay ===
One account of the battle comes from the monk and chronicler Peter of Vaux-de-Cernay. This account is favored by Laurence Marvin in The Occitan War: A Military and Political History of the Albigensian Crusade. In this account, the crusaders could see Simon leaving Castelnaudary which boosted their morale. The crusader knights charged at the center of the southern army and routed them with Peter saying they were "beaten in an instant." At some point during the opening engagement, Martin Algai fled the field with his knights fearing that the battle was lost. With the southern cavalry defeated, the crusader cavalry charged into the infantry on the flank, killing many of them and forcing them to flee. By the time Simon arrived with his horsemen, the battle had already been won. Instead he joined in pursuing the fleeing enemies in what Peter called "an enormous slaughter."

=== Account by William of Tudela and William of Puylaurens ===
Another account of the battle comes from the poet William of Tudela and is supported by the chronicler William of Puylaurens. This account is favored by Jonathan Sumption in The Albigensian Crusade. In this account, the crusader knights charge at the southern center and succeed in pushing them back, but do not immediately break them. Despite a successful charge, the crusader center is slowly pushed back by the greater numbers of the Count of Foix. Bouchard de Marly is forced to retreat but does so in good order, while Martin Algai flees the field believing the battle is lost. Part of the southern army, rather than chasing the retreating crusaders, turns to loot the now unprotected baggage train.

Both Tudela and Puylaurens claimed that Simon's appearance turned the tide in favor of the crusaders. Puylaurens wrote that the crusaders "by now had almost succumbed" and Simon "found a few of them still resisting." Tudela does not put the crusaders in a state of near defeat but does have them disengaged until they see Simon. Bouchard and his knights, seeing Simon approach with reinforcements, turned and rejoined the battle. The southern army had become disorganized with much of the army, particularly the mercenaries, looting the baggage train. Foix's army was charged from two directions by Bouchard and Simon, causing most of them to rout. The Count of Foix, his son, and many faidit knights continued to fight until they were also forced to flee. The crusaders chased the southern army, killing many in the rout.

== Aftermath ==
Accounts of the battle attribute heavy losses to the southern army whereas crusader losses were comparatively lighter. With the baggage train saved, Simon was able to return to Castelnaudary with reinforcements and supplies. An attack on the gates by Savari de Mauléon withdrew once news reaches them that Foix had been defeated. With his position secure, Simon went to Narbonne to raise more reinforcements, but the southern army raised the siege and withdrew before he could return.

Despite the victory by the crusaders, the southern army was able to successfully spread a rumor that the crusaders were defeated and Simon killed. Tudela blames this on the Toulousians while Peter blames the Count of Foix, but the result is that dozens of towns and castles defect from the crusaders. Simon is forced to spend the rest of 1211 and the winter of 1212 retaking lost territory.

The betrayal of the southern knight, William Cat, was another heavy blow for Simon. Both Puylaurens and Peter wrote that he was a close friend to Simon and godfather to his child. Peter goes further to say that Simon had knighted him and trusted him more than any other of the native southerners. The betrayal of William and the defection of so many regions at the rumor of his defeat led to Simon developing a deep distrust and hatred of the southerners and changed his priorities from combating heresy to defeating his enemies and conquering new lands.

== Bibliography ==
=== Secondary Sources ===
- Marvin, Laurence W. (2008). The Occitan War: A Military and Political History of the Albigensian Crusade, 1209-1218. Cambridge, UK: Cambridge University Press. ISBN 978-0521123655.
- Sumption, Jonathan (1999). The Albigensian Crusade. London, UK: Faber. ISBN 978-0571200023.

=== Primary Sources ===
- Peter of les Vaux de Cernay (1998) [1212-1218]. The History of the Albigensian Crusade: Peter of les Vaux-de-Cernay's Historia Albigensis. Translated by Silby, W.A.; Silby, M.D. Suffolk, UK: Boydell & Brewer. ISBN 0-85115-807-2.
- William of Tudela; Anonymous (2000) [1213]. The Song of the Cathar Wars: A History of the Albigensian Crusade. Translated by Shirley, Janet. Burlington, VT: Ashgate Publishing Company. ISBN 9780754603887.
- William of Puylaurens (2003) [1200s]. The Chronicle of William of Puylaurens: The Albigensian Crusade and its Aftermath. Translated by Silby, W.A.; Silby, M.D. Suffolk, UK: Boydell & Brewer. ISBN 978-1-84615-043-2.
