= Esclarmonde (disambiguation) =

Esclarmonde is an 1889 French opera by Jules Massenet.

Esclarmonde may also refer to :

- Esclarmonde of Foix (1151–1215), lady of L'Isle-Jourdain and prominent figure in Catharism in France
- Esclaramunda of Foix (1255–1315), Queen consort of Majorca island, grand niece of the first one
- Esclarmonde de Foix, daughter of Roger-Bernard II, Count of Foix
- Esclarmonde de Babylone, a fictional character of the 13th-century French epic Huon of Bordeaux
