= John Harpeden =

John Harpeden may refer to:

- John Harpeden I ([fl. 1371–1389), seneschal of Saintonge and Aquitaine
- John Harpeden II (fl. 1372–1415), French courtier
- John Harpeden (died 1438), English knight
