= Siege of Castelnaudary =

1211 Albigensian Crusade siege

Siege of Castelnaudary (1211)
- Part of the Albigensian Crusade
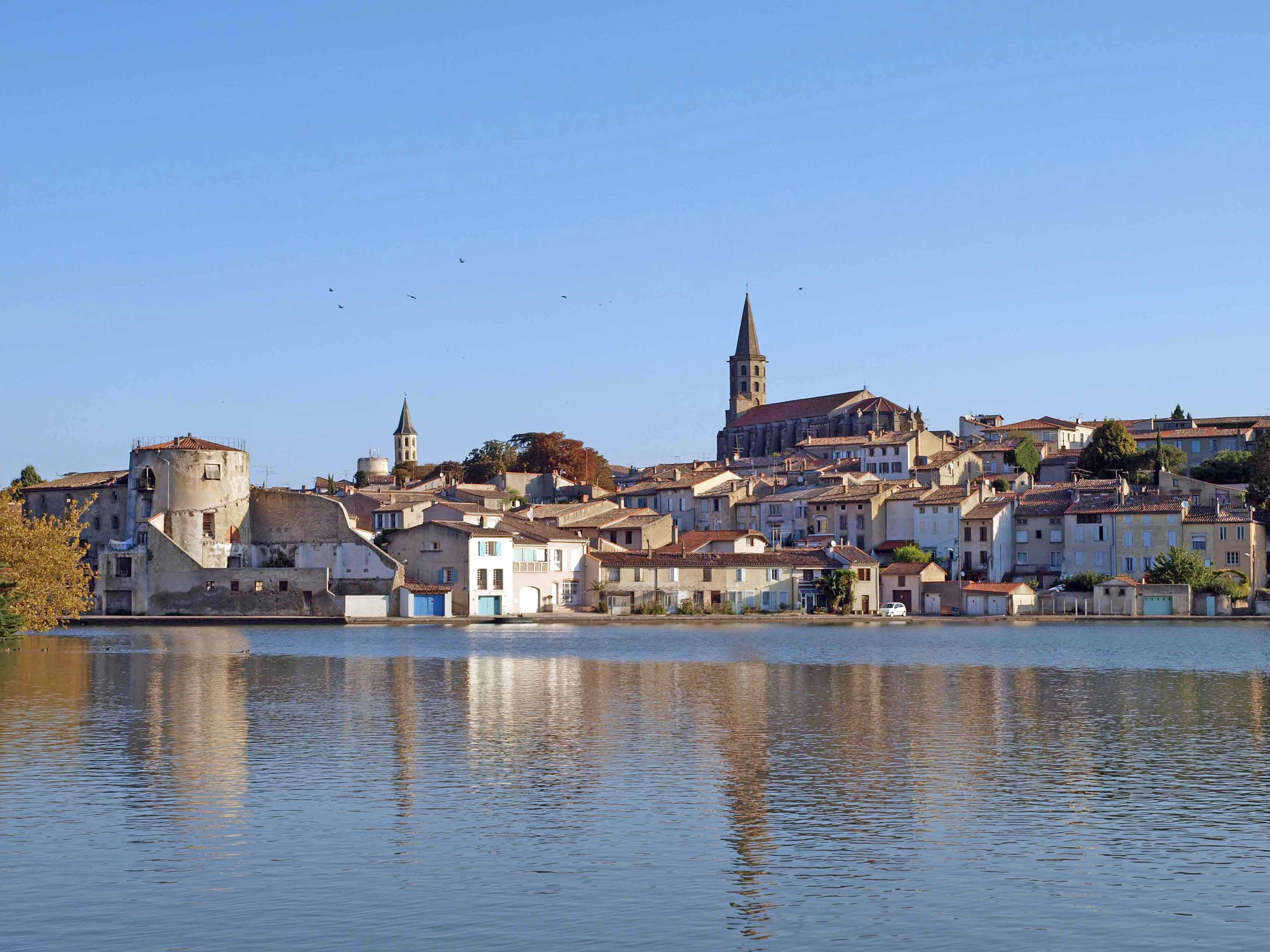
- Modern view of Castelnaudary
Date	September 1211
Location	Castelnaudary, Occitania
Result	Crusader victory

Belligerents
Crusaders	County of Toulouse; County of Foix; Viscounty of Béarn

Commanders and leaders
Simon de Montfort	Raymond VI, Count of Toulouse; Raymond-Roger, Count of Foix; Gaston VI, Viscount of Béarn; Savari de Mauléon

Strength
500	5000

Casualties and losses
Minimal	Moderate

The siege of Castelnaudary was a military engagement which took place in September 1211 during the Albigensian Crusade. It took place in the Occitania region of southern France against the town of Castelnaudary. The siege was led by Raymond VI, Count of Toulouse against Simon de Montfort. After less than a month, the southern army lifted the siege.

== Background ==
The Albigensian Crusade began in 1209 in an effort to eliminate heretics from southern France and was resisted by the southern nobility. After the southern victory over Simon de Montfort at the Siege of Toulouse and the subsequent departure of many crusaders, Raymond VI and his allies decided to go on the offensive against Simon. He began gathering an army which Laurence Marvin calls "perhaps the largest army fielded by southern lords up to this point in the war". The news of such a large southern force prompted defections by fortresses that had previously surrendered to the crusaders.

Simon de Montfort called a council of war to determine the next course of action. Hugh de Lacy, 1st Earl of Ulster suggested that rather than stay in Carcassonne and allow Raymond to take the initiative, Simon should defend his weakest possession, which was the recently burned town of Castelnaudary. The plan was that rather than allow Raymond to ravage his lands, he would purposefully expose himself at Castelnaudary and force a confrontation. Simon agreed and led a small crusader army to garrison it.

== Opposing forces ==
The Occitan army was gathered from across Raymond's territories along with contingents led by his allies the Viscount of Béarn, the Count of Foix, and Savari de Mauléon. It was also accompanied by a large force of mercenaries. Jonathan Sumption gives an estimate of 5000 soldiers for the southern army. The crusader army was much smaller, with an estimated 500 knights and sergeants.

== Siege ==
=== Initial phase ===
As the Southern army arrived outside the town in September 1211, the town militia defending Saint Peter's suburb fled and the attackers entered the suburb without a fight. Since the crusaders were eating, they were not initially aware of what happened. When Simon learned that the suburb has fallen, he led an assault and recaptured it. The attackers again recaptured Saint Peter's suburb and created gaps in the walls to allow for an easy escape if the garrison counter attacked. The next day, the crusaders pushed the southern forces out of the suburb.

Raymond adopted a defensive posture and set his camp on a hill to the North, too far away to effectively pressure the garrison. He also did not surround the town, allowing the defenders to collect food and water from the surrounding area. Instead he heavily fortified the siege camp with trenches and palisades. Simon was much more aggressive, leading constant raids against the enemy camp. Peter of Vaux-de-Cernay wrote that it seemed as if the defenders were the "besiegers rather than besieged."

At some point, the Count of Foix led a large attack on the gate. The crusaders counter-attacked and drove the attackers back to their camp. As the siege continued the southerners launched further assaults, but these were also repelled. The Count of Toulouse built mangonels and a trebuchet to bombard the walls. The mangonels were ineffective and the attackers were initially unable to find rocks for the trebuchet that would not break on impact. They were eventually able to find better ammunition for the trebuchet and it began to cause extensive damage to the walls. The trebuchet was enough of a threat that Simon led a sortie against it, but the siege engine was so well defended that the crusaders were forced to withdraw.

=== Battle of Saint-Martin-Lalande ===
While Simon was not in immediate danger, he knew he required more supplies and more soldiers. He sent his marshal, Guy de Levis, to bring reinforcements and supplies. The effort to find reinforcements was mostly a failure and Guy was only able to gather 500 men, many of whom deserted. Besides this, Simon also sought reinforcements from Bouchard de Marly and the Spanish mercenary Martin Algai, who were able to gather 100 and 20 knights respectively. Guy, Bouchard, and Martin all gathered to escort a supply train which was making its way to Castelnaudary from Carcassonne. William Cat, a southern knight who Simon deeply trusted and considered a close friend, defected from the crusaders and shared this information with the southern army.

The Count of Foix led his force of about 2000 men to intercept the convoy at Saint-Martin-Lalande. Simon sent 40 knights from Castelnaudary to assist the supply train, bringing the Crusader army to around 750 men in total. The Count of Foix blocked the road from Saint-Martin-Lalande, forcing the crusader reinforcements to fight through them to reach Castelnaudary. He deployed his army into 3 formations with his knights and heavy cavalry in the center, light horsemen on one flank, and infantry on the other. The crusader knights charged the southern knights in the center, pushing the southerners back. On the flanks, things went poorly for the crusaders. On one flank, Bouchard de Marly was forced to retreat but was able to do so in good order. On the other flank, Martin Algai fled the field entirely, believing the battle was lost.

Anxious of the outcome of the battle, Simon de Montfort rode out of Castelnaudary with 50 or 60 mounted men, leaving his infantry and five knights to hold the town. At this point, the southern force had become disorganized with part of it looting the unprotected supply convoy. Simon charged into the rear of the southern army and pinned them between his own group and the remaining crusaders. This charge routed the southern army and allowed the supply convoy to reach the town.

=== End of the siege ===
As the rest of the southern army awaited for news of the battle, Savari de Mauléon led an attack on Castelnaudary. When news reached them that the Count of Foix had been defeated, the attackers withdrew back to their camp. Simon wanted to use the momentum to launch an assault against the siege camp, but with his men tired from battle and the camp heavily protected with ditches and palisades, he instead withdrew to Castelnaudary. Despite the heavy loss at Saint-Martin-Lalande, Count Raymond continued the siege. Count Simon, believing his victory would inspire more men to join him, left to recruit further reinforcements. While he was in Narbonne, Count Raymond raised the siege and burned what could not be carried.

== Aftermath ==
Despite the tactical victory by the crusaders at Saint-Martin-Lalande and the withdrawal of the siege at Castelnaudary, the southern forces dealt a blow to Simon by spreading disinformation about the battle. The retreating southern army sent messengers to spread the news that the crusaders had actually been defeated and that Simon had been killed. Dozens of towns and castles defected from Simon and many of the territorial gains made by the crusaders were lost.

Simon de Montfort was forced to spend the rest of the year and the winter of 1212 retaking rebellious fortresses and renewing oaths of loyalty. The Counts of Toulouse and Foix continued to spread the news of the crusader defeat while keeping pressure on the crusader army and recovering lost territory. Reinforcements of 100 knights under Robert Mauvoison in the winter of 1211 helped stabilize Simon's position. As further reinforcements arrived in the Spring of 1212, Simon was once again able to take the offensive.

The siege and battle demonstrated the lack of strategic unity between the southern nobles. Joseph Strayer writes that their lack of coordination in the campaign of 1211 was their "fatal weakness" and meant their "superior numbers were useless." He also claims that if Raymond of Toulouse had besieged Castelnaudary aggressively and assisted the Count of Foix, it was likely that Simon would have been badly defeated. Marvin writes that the inactivity of the southern army and their strategy of remaining on the defensive, even when on the tactical offensive demonstrated their "fear of Simon of Montfort and his small army." Sumption writes that for Count Raymond VI, the siege of Castelnaudary was a "humiliating fiasco."

The campaign of 1211 also signaled a further shift in the war from a religious war against heresy to a political war of conquest. Sumption writes that Simon had come to believe the South could not be "rallied against the Albigensian heresy." He also claims that the defection of William Cat and the rebellion of so many fortresses left Simon with a deep hatred and distrust of the southerners. Marvin writes that it was "increasingly obvious" that uprooting heresy had become less important to Simon than conquering territory and defeating those who defied him. The chronicler William of Puylaurens wrote that the betrayal of William Cat caused Simon to "eschew association" with the southern knights.

== Bibliography ==
=== Secondary Sources ===
- Marvin, Laurence W. (2008). The Occitan War: A Military and Political History of the Albigensian Crusade, 1209-1218. Cambridge, UK: Cambridge University Press. doi:10.1017/CBO9780511496561. ISBN 978-0521123655. Full access available to users of The Wikipedia Library.
- Sumption, Jonathan (1999). The Albigensian Crusade. London, UK: Faber. ISBN 978-0571200023.
- Evans, Austin P (1962). "VIII THE ALBIGENSIAN CRUSADE". In Wolff, Robert Lee; Hazard, Harry W. (eds.). A History of the Crusades, Volume 2: The Later Crusades. University of Pennsylvania Press. pp. 277–324. ISBN 978-1-5128-2023-2. JSTOR j.ctv4s7mwv.17.
- Strayer, Joseph R (1992). The Albigensian Crusades. Ann Arbor, MI: University of Michigan Press. ISBN 978-0472064762.
- Pegg, Mark Gregory (2008). A Most Holy War: The Albigensian Crusade and the Battle for Christendom. New York, NY: Oxford University Press. ISBN 978-0195171310.

=== Primary Sources ===
- Peter of les Vaux de Cernay (1998) [1212-1218]. The History of the Albigensian Crusade: Peter of les Vaux-de-Cernay's Historia Albigensis. Translated by Silby, W.A.; Silby, M.D. Suffolk, UK: Boydell & Brewer. ISBN 0-85115-807-2.
- William of Tudela; Anonymous (2000) [1213]. The Song of the Cathar Wars: A History of the Albigensian Crusade. Translated by Shirley, Janet. Burlington, VT: Ashgate Publishing Company. ISBN 9780754603887.
- William of Puylaurens (2003) [1200s]. The Chronicle of William of Puylaurens: The Albigensian Crusade and its Aftermath. Translated by Silby, W.A.; Silby, M.D. Suffolk, UK: Boydell & Brewer. ISBN 978-1-84615-043-2.
