= Bertrand III de Cardaillac =

French knight and administrator

Sir Bertrand III de Cardaillac was a 13th-century French knight and administrator who served as Seneschal of Gascony, Limousin, Quercy and Périgord.

== Life ==
Cardaillac was the eldest son of Hugues III de Cardaillac and Soubirane de La Roche. He served as the Seneschal of Gascony, Limousin, Quercy and Périgord. He was succeeded by his son Bertrand.
