= Allerion =

Allerion may refer to:

- Alerion, a heraldic bird
- Allerion, Inc., formerly Ultimate, developer of the second implementation of the Pick database
