= Wisham =

Wisham is the surname of:

- John de Wisham (died 1332), English knight, Constable of St Briavels Castle, Justice of North Wales, Seneschal of Gascony and Captain of Berwick-upon-Tweed
- Mary Nesbitt Wisham (1925–2013), American pitcher and first basewoman in the All-American Girls Professional Baseball League
- Alex and Missy Wisham, characters in The Code, an Australian TV series

== See also ==
- Al Wisham, a neighbourhood in Riyadh, Saudia Arabia
- Washim district, a district in Maharashtra, India
  - Washim, a city and Municipal Council in the district
