= William de Boell =

13th century Norman knight and administrator

William de Boell (Note: Also William de Bueles, Boeles, Bueles, Buelles.) was a 13th-century Norman knight and administrator who served as Warden of the Cinque Ports (1240), Seneschal of Gascony (1245–1247) during the reign of King Henry III of England.

== Life ==
Boell was formerly a marshal of the king's household. In 1233, Montgomery Castle and the Honour of Montgomery was granted to William de Boeles along with all related property. William served as Warden of the Norman Isles for six months from January 1240. Appointed on 16 July 1245 as Seneschal of Gascony, replacing Nicholas de Moels, Boell served until he was replaced by Drogo de Barentyn in 1247.
