= Roger-Bernard I of Foix =

French noble

Count of Foix
- Tenure: 1148 – 1188
- Predecessor: Roger III
- Successor: Raymond Roger
- Born: c. 1130
- Died: 1180
- Spouse: Cecilia Trencavel
- House: House of Foix
- Father: Roger III
- Mother: Jimena of Barcelona

Roger Bernard I the Fat (c. 1130 – November 1188) was the fifth Count of Foix from 1148.

At Pamiers in 1149 and again in 1163, he had to make restitution of confiscated lands to the church of Saint-Antonin of Fredelas. He made a paréage with the church dividing the government of the lands between them. The count was to have charge of defence and justice. Another pareage was established with the abbey of Saint-Volusien in 1168, where rents were split between the ecclesiastic and comital authorities.

On 11 July 1151, Roger Bernard married Cecilia, daughter of Raymond Trencavel, and became a vassal of the County of Barcelona. However, he avoided involving himself in the count's war of 1159 and concentrated on expanding his own zone of influence, as by a treaty with the lords of Dun in 1162. In 1185, he was finally constrained to fight alongside the count of Barcelona, Alfonso the Chaste, in southern France. Only Bernard IV of Comminges successfully remained neutral. It seems that the count intended to confide the government of Provence to him.

Roger Bernard was buried in the abbey of Boulbonne and succeeded by his son Raymond Roger. He was also the father of Esclarmonde de Foix and Rohese de Foix.

== Sources ==
- Viader, Roland (2003). L'Andorre du IXe au XIVe siècle: montagne, féodalité et communautés (in French). Presses du Universitaires du Mirail.
- (in French) Histoire des comtes de Foix.

Preceded by Roger III of Foix	Count of Foix; 1148–1188	Succeeded by Raimond-Roger of Foix
