= Saissac =

Commune in Occitanie, France

- Commune
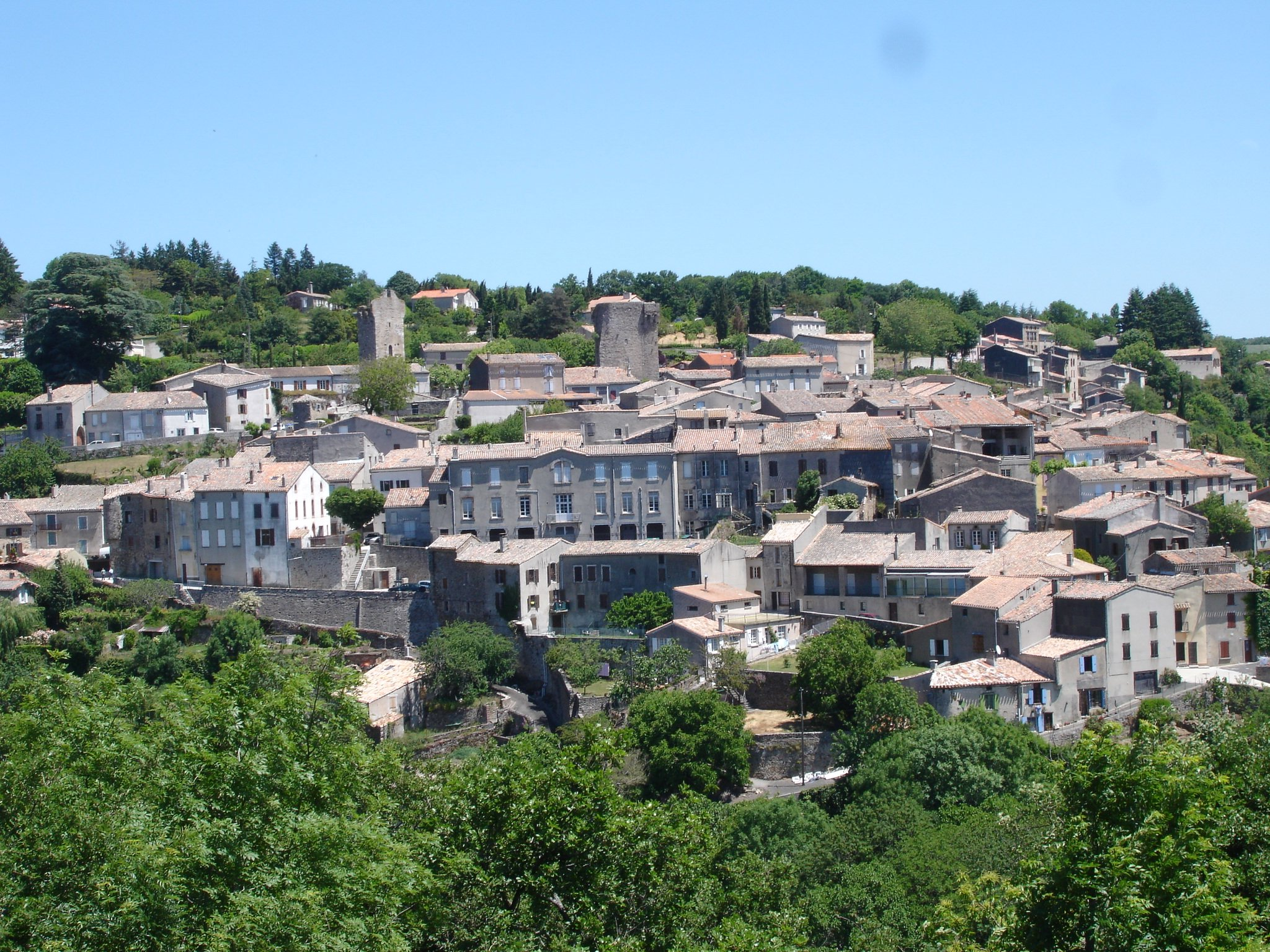
- A general view of Saissac

- Coat of arms
- Location of Saissac
- Location within France Location within Occitanie
- Coordinates: 43°21′42″N 2°10′10″E
- Country: France
- Region: Occitania
- Department: Aude
- Arrondissement: Carcassonne
- Canton: La Malepère à la Montagne Noire

Government
  - Mayor (2020–2026): Eric Beteille
- Area^{1}: 57.03 km^{2} (22.02 sq mi)
- Elevation: 500 m (1,600 ft)
- Highest elevation: 742 m (2,434 ft)
- Lowest elevation: 166 m (545 ft)
- Population (2023): 904
  - Density: 15.9/km^{2} (41.1/sq mi)
- Time zone: UTC+01:00 (CET)
  - Summer (DST): UTC+02:00 (CEST)
- INSEE/Postal code: 11367 /11310
- ^{1} French Land Register data, which excludes lakes, ponds, glaciers > 1 km^{2} (0.386 sq mi or 247 acres) and river estuaries.

Saissac (French pronunciation: [sɛsak]) is a commune in the Aude department in southern France.

== Geography ==
The village is perched in the foothills of the Montagne Noire (Black Mountain) at an altitude of 467 m and has views of the Vernassonne Gorge as well as the valley plain which stretches between Carcassonne and Castelnaudary.

== History ==
The name of the village first appeared in the 10th century and originates from the Gallo-Romain Saxiago. The history of the village is strongly linked to the Château built in the 10th century.

== Population ==
Historical population
Year	Pop.	±% p.a.
1968	705	—
1975	652	−1.11%
1982	709	+1.20%
1990	867	+2.55%
1999	923	+0.70%
2007	1,007	+1.09%
2012	918	−1.83%
2017	929	+0.24%
2023	904	−0.45%
Source: INSEE

== Sights ==
Near Saissac, there is a transmitter for broadcasting messages to submerged submarines, the La Regine Transmitter. Its mast was built in 1973 and is 330 metres tall – as tall as the Eiffel Tower.

- Arboretum du Lampy

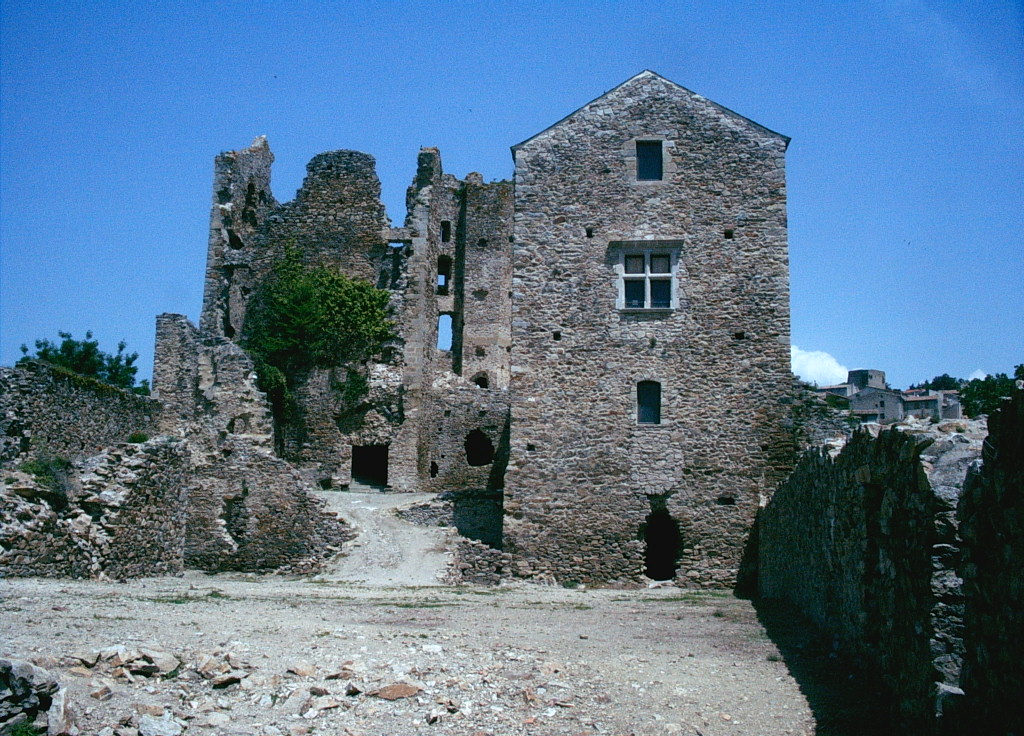
Château de Saissac

== See also ==
- Communes of the Aude department
