= Esclarmonde of Foix =

French Cathar figure (died 1215)

- Born: after 1151/ 1165–1167; Occitania, France
- Died: 1215; Occitania, France
- Other names: La Grande Esclarmonde
- Occupation: Albigense Delegate to Council at Pamiers 1207
- Spouse: Jordan III of L'Isle-Jourdain
- Parent(s): Roger-Bernard I of Foix and Cecile Trencavel
- Family: House of Foix

Esclarmonde of Foix (French: Esclarmonde de Foix; Occitan: Esclarmonda de Fois), was a prominent figure associated with Catharism in thirteenth century Occitania (in the south of modern-day France).

Her biography is difficult to establish since several noblewomen in the same area at the same time had the same rare first name. The name Esclarmonde means "clarity of the world" in the Occitan language.

== Family ==
Esclarmonde of Foix was the daughter of Roger Bernard I, Count of Foix, and Cécile Trencavel, daughter of Raymond I Trencavel. Raymond-Roger of Foix, Count of Foix was her brother.

In 1175, she married Jourdain III, lord of L'Isle-Jourdain. They had:

- Bernard-Jourdain de l'Isle-Jourdain, the eldest and heir
- Escaronia
- Obica
- Jordan
- Othon-Bernard
- Philippa

== Spiritual life ==
Esclarmonde was widowed in October 1200 and turned to Catharism sometime thereafter. (Note: Mundy states Esclarmonde converted to either Catharism or Waldensian.) Catharism was a Christian dualist or Gnostic movement which thrived in Southern Europe, particularly in northern Italy and southern France. The religion was seen as heresy by the Catholic church.

Esclarmonde received the Cathar sacrament, the consolamentum, for becoming a Cathar Perfect from the Cathar bishop Guilhabert de Castres in 1204 in Fanjeaux, along with three other women of high rank, Aude de Fanjeaux, Fays de Durfort, and Raymonde of Saint-Germain. The ceremony was conducted in the presence of her brother, Raymond-Roger of Foix.

Esclarmonde settled in Pamiers and was probably involved in an initiative to rebuild the fortress of the Château de Montségur. She participated in the Conference of Pamiers of 1207, which followed the Conference of Montreal of the previous year. It was the last debate between the Cathars and the Roman Catholic Church, represented by Dominic Guzman, founder of the Dominican order and later known as Saint Dominic, and Diego de Acebo, the bishop of Osma.

The following year, in 1208, Pope Innocent III launched the Albigensian Crusade against the Cathars after the murder of his delegate Pierre de Castelnau.

== Legacy ==
Esclarmonde is remembered differently by different groups in France. For the Catholics, she spread heresy in the country and forced people to adopt the rules of the Cathars. For others, she was remembered for the creation of schools and hospitals in the region, earning the nickname "la Grande Esclarmonde" – "The Great Esclarmonde".

The significance of her name's meaning, i.e. "clarity of the world", is explored in several medieval epic poems including one referred to as "Esclaramonde", by Bertran de Born, and in "Parzival" by Wolfram von Eschenbach.

In her memory, in 1978, the University of Winnipeg created the Esclarmonde de Foix Memorial Travel Scholarship.

== Sources ==
- Graham-Leigh, Elaine (2005). The Southern French Nobility and the Albigensian Crusade. Boydell Press.
- Huey, Whitney (2012) [2011]. "Cathars". The Encyclopedia of Christian Civilization. Chichester, West Sussex: Wiley-Blackwell. doi:10.1002/9780470670606.wbecc0246. ISBN 9781405157629.
- Mundy, John Hine (1990). "2, A: Public Office and Law". Men and women at Toulouse in the age of the Cathars. Pontifical Institute of Mediaeval Studies.
- Tuten, Belle S. (2022). Daily Life of Women in Medieval Europe. ABC-CLIO.
- University of Winnipeg (2006). "Esclarmonde de Foix Memorial Travel Scholarship". www.uwinnipeg.ca. Archived from the original on 2006-09-28.
- William of Puylaurens (2003). Sibley, W.A.; Sibley, M.D. (eds.). The Chronicle of William of Puylaurens: The Albigensian Crusade and Its Aftermath. The Boydell Press.
