= Seneschal of Gascony =

The Seneschal of Gascony was an officer carrying out and managing the domestic affairs of the lord of the Duchy of Gascony. During the course of the twelfth century, the seneschalship also became an office of military command. After 1360, the officer was the Seneschal of Aquitaine. There was an office above the seneschalcy, the Lieutenancy of the Duchy of Aquitaine, but it was filled only intermittently (in times of emergency).

The seneschal managed the household, coordinating between the receivers of various landholdings and the chamber, treasury, and the chancellory or chapel. The seneschals of Gascony, like those appointed in Normandy, Poitou, and Anjou, had custody of demesne fortresses, the regional treasuries, and presidency of the highest court of regional custom. Detailed records of the Gascon Exchequers during the reign of Henry III of England indicate that there most likely was a functioning exchequer.

== List of Seneschals ==
- Geoffroy de Celles (1195)
- Brandin (1199–1201)
- Robert of Thornham (1201–1202)
- Martin Algai (1202–1204)
- Geoffrey de Neville (1214) – first appointment
- Reginald of Pons (1214–1217)
- Guillaume Amanieu (1217–1218)
- Geoffrey de Neville (1218–1219) – second appointment
  - Philip of Oldcoates (1220) – died while enroute in October 1220
- Hugh de Vivonne (1221) – first appointment
- Savari de Mauléon (1221–1224)
- Richard of Cornwall (1225)
- Henry de Turberville (1227–1230) – first appointment
  - Richard de Burgh (1231) – never took office
- Hugh de Vivonne (1231–1234) – second appointment
- Henry de Turberville (1234–1237) – second appointment
- Hubert Hoese (1237–1238)
- Henry de Turberville (1238) – third appointment
- Rustan de Solers (1241–1242)
- John Maunsell (1242–1243)
- Nicholas de Moels (1243–1245)
- William de Boell (1245–1247)
- Drogo de Barentyn (1247–1248) – first appointment
- Simon de Montfort (1248)
- Richard de Grey (1248)
- Drogo de Barentyn (1250) – second appointment, held jointly
- Peter de Bordeaux (1250) – held jointly
- John de Grey (1253–1254)
  - Richard de Grey – acting during the seneschal's absence in 1253
- Stephen Bauzan (1254–1255)
- Stephen Longespée (1255)
- Bertrand de Cardaillac (1259–1260)
- Drogo de Barentyn (1260) – third appointment
- Jean I de Grailly (1266–1268) – first appointment
- Thomas d'Ippegrave (1268–1269)
- Fortaner de Cazeneuve (1269)
- Hugh de Turberville (1271–1272)
- Luke de Tany (1272–1278)
- Jean I de Grailly (1278–1283) – second appointment
  - John de Vaux (1283) – never took office
- Jean I de Grailly (1283–1287) – third appointment
- William Middleton (1287–1288)
- John de Havering (1288–1294) – first appointment
- John St John (1294–1297)
- John de Hastings (1302–1305) – first appointment
- John de Havering (1305–1308) – second appointment
- Guy Ferre (1308–1309) – first appointment
  - Amanèu du Foussat (1309–1310) – acting during the seneschal's absence from September 1309 to February 1310
- John de Hastings (1309–1312) – second appointment
  - Assiu de Galard – acting during the seneschal's absence from August 1311 to February 1312
- John de Ferrers of Chartley (1312) – died in office
  - Jordan Morant – his lieutenant
- Estèbe Ferréol (1312–1313)
- Amaury III de Craon (1313–1316) – first appointment
  - Gaucelm de Campagne his lieutenant
- Gilbert Peche (1316–1317)
- Antonio di Pessagno (1317–1318)
  - Amanèu du Foussat (1317–1318) – acting during the seneschal's absence from November 1317.
- William de Montague (1318–1319) – died in office
- Amanèu du Foussat (1319–1320)
- Maurice de Berkeley (1320–1320)
- Amaury III de Craon (1320–1322) – second appointment
- Fulk le Strange (1322)
- Ralph Basset of Drayton (1323–1324) – first appointment
- Robert de Shirland (1324)
- Richard Grey (1324)
- Ralph Basset of Drayton (1324) – second appointment
- John de Wisham (1324–1325)
- John de Segrave (1324–1325) – probably never took up office
- Henri IV de Sully (1325–1326)
- Oliver Ingham (1326–1327) – first appointment
- John de Hausted (1327–1331)
- Oliver Ingham (1331–1343) – second appointment
  - John de Norwich (1338) – lieutenant of above
- Nicholas de la Beche (1343–1345)
- Ralph Stafford (1345–1347)
  - Hugh Hastings (1347) – did not act
- Thomas Coke (1347–1349)
- Frank van Hallen (1349)
- John de Cheverston (1350––?1351) – first appointment
  - Arnold Savage (1350) – lieutenant of above
  - John de Charneles (1351) – lieutenant of above
- John de Cheverston (1354) – second appointment
- Richard de Stafford of Clifton (1361)
- John Chandos (1361–1362)
- John de Cheverston (1362) – third appointment
- Thomas Felton (1363–1377)
- William le Scrope (1383–1384) – first appointment
- John Harpeden (1385–1389)
- John Trailly (1389–1390) – first appointment
- William le Scrope (1390–1394) – second appointment
- John Trailly (1397) – second appointment
- Archambaud de Grailly (1397–1399)
- Gaillard II de Durfort (1399–1415)
- John Tiptoft (1415–1423)
- John Radcliffe (1423–1436)
- Thomas Rempston (1440–1441; 1442)
- Robert Vere (1441) – first appointment
- Robert Roos (1442–1443)
- William Bonville (1442–1445) – first appointment
- Robert Vere (1445) – second appointment
- William Bonville (1450) – second appointment
- Richard Woodville (1450–1453)
- William Bonville (1453) – third appointment, did not act
- Roger Camoys (1453)
