= Hugh de Turberville =

Historic British noble

- Died: 1293
- Children: Thomas; Sybil

Hugh de Turberville (died 1293) was an English noble and soldier.

== Life ==
Turberville arms: Argent, a lion rampant gules, crowned or.

Hugh de Turberville was from the Turberville family of Crickhowell, Brecknockshire, Wales. From 1271 to 1272, he served as the Seneschal of Gascony. Hugh held Crickhowell Castle from 1273, as mesne lord, the vassal of Reginald FitzPiers.

As a knight of the royal household of King Edward I of England, he was one of the commanders during the campaign against Wales during 1277. During the campaign of 1282 during the conquest of Wales, he was one of the leader of eight lances of the cavalry, before appointment as a Knight banneret, commander of 6000 Foot soldiers from the Welsh Marches.

In 1283, he was commander of 1000 foot soldiers and was elevated to Deputy Constable. In 1284, he briefly served as commander of Castell y Bere in Merionethshire, Wales. Turberville was granted Hasfield, Gloucestershire by his daughter's father-inlaw, Grimbold Paunceforte, for life, reverting on Hugh's death to Grimbold's son, Grimbold. During the rebellion of Rhys ap Maredudd he participated in the siege of Dryslwyn Castle in 1287, after which he served in 1288 for a few months as Deputy Justiciar of North Wales. Hugh was again the commander of Castell y Bere, which he held until his death in 1293.

Turberville appears to be the father of Thomas, who was executed as a spy in 1295. His daughter Sybil married Grimbold Paunceforte, who inherited Crickhowell Castle.
