= Pierre-Jean Fabre =

French doctor and alchemist (1588–1658)

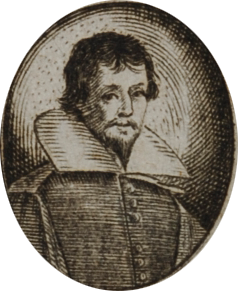
Portrait detail from title page of Palladium spagyricum, 1624

Pierre-Jean Fabre (1588 – 9 January 1658) was a French doctor and alchemist. Born in Castelnaudary, France in 1588, he studied medicine in Montpellier, France. He became a practitioner of the iatrochemical medicine of Paracelsus. Beginning in 1610 he practiced medicine in Castelnaudary. He became famous as a specialist in the plague which was particularly severe in central Europe during the Thirty Years' War. Fabre prescribed chemical medications for the treatment of the plague and was at one time the private physician of King Louis XIII.

Fabre was a practising alchemist, and claimed to have succeeded in the alchemical transmutation of lead into silver on 22 July 1627. He was strongly attracted to mystical aspects of chemistry, drawing parallels between the chemical operations of alchemy and the sacraments of the Christian church, particularly in his Alchymista Christianus (1632).

Fabre died in Castelnaudary on 9 January 1658.

== Alchymista Christianus ==
"He saw valid correspondences between the sacraments and chemical operations: calcination symbolised penitence; fire and water corresponded to baptism; and the Philosopher's Stone could be compared to nothing less than the Eucharist. Assuming this, Fabre thought that true alchemists were like priests; the spirit of mercury was like the angels; the earth was like the Virgin Mary; and the life-giving properties of salt gave it a valid connection to Christ. These correspondences could be visualised because they were sculpted on the great churches of France, whose artist-architects had presented their esoteric knowledge to the viewer." -

== Bibliography ==
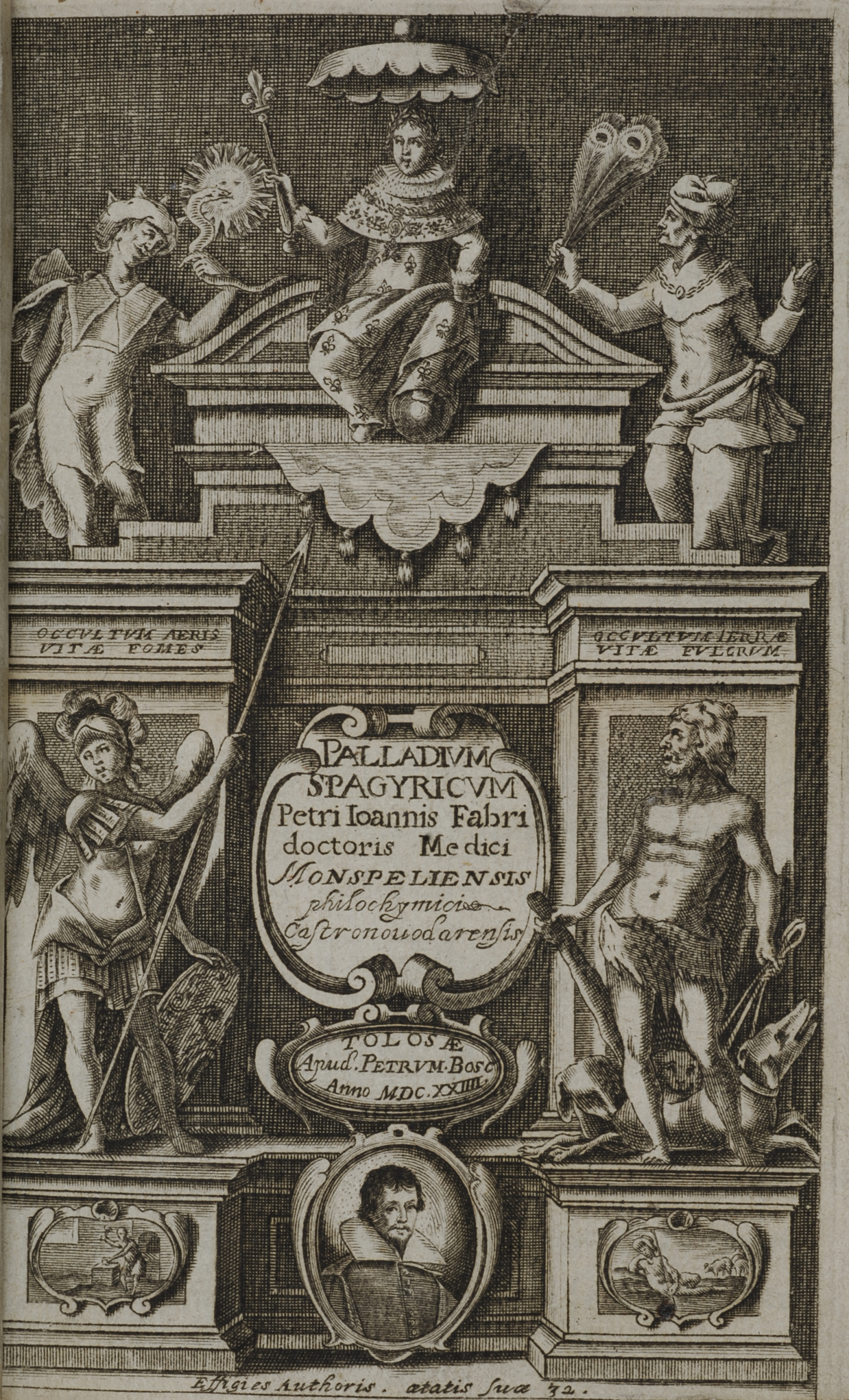
Palladium spagyricum, title page, 1624

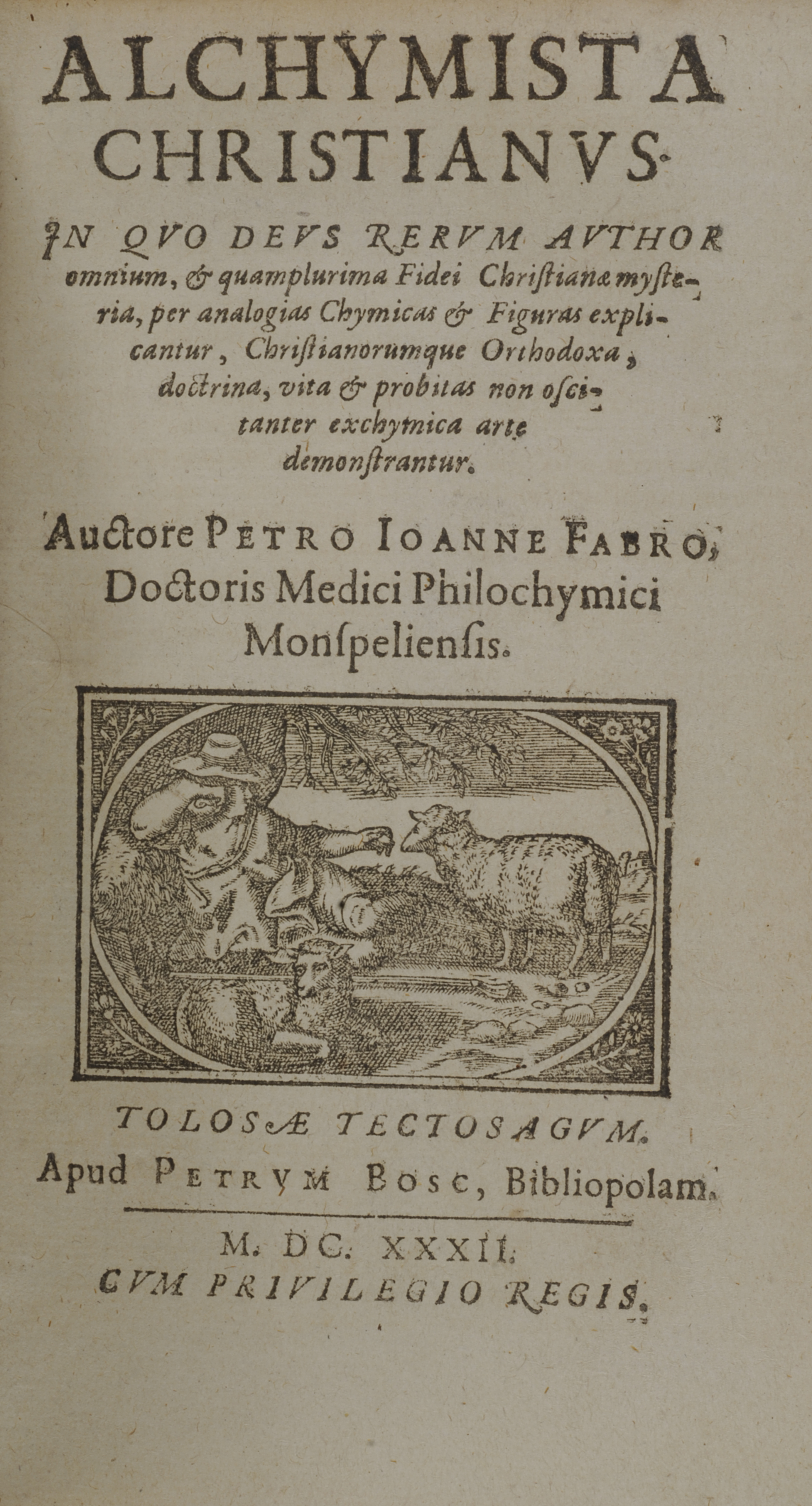
Alchymista Christianus, title page, 1632

- Palladium Spagyricum, Toulouse, Bosc, 1624, 276 p.
- Chirurgica spagyrica, Toulouse, Bosc, 1626, 176 p. Traduction française manuscrite de Pierre Mallet, Chartres, 1649.
- Insignes curationes variorum morborum quos medicamentis chymicis jucundissima methodo curavit, Toulouse, Bosc, 1627.
- Myrothecium spagyricum, Toulouse, Bosc, 1628, 448 p.
- Traité de la peste selon la doctrine des médecins spagyriques, Toulouse, 1629, Castres, 1653.
- Alchymista christianus, Toulouse, Bosc, 1632. Trad. (XVIII° s.) : L'alchimiste chrétien (édition de Frank Greiner), Paris et Milan, Archè, 2001, 732 p. Paraphrase alchimique de la Theologia naturalis de Raymond Sebond. Texte latin 1632, 32-236-4.
- Hercules pio-chymicus, Toulouse, Bosc, 1634.
- L'Abrégé des secrets chymiques, où l'on voit la nature des animaux, végétaux et minéraux entièrement découverts, avec les vertus et propriétés des principes qui composent et conservent leur être; et un traité de la médecine générale, Paris, Pierre Billaine, 1636. Gutenberg Reprints, 1990.
- Hydrographum spagyricum, Toulouse, Bosc, 1639, 260 p.
- Propugnaculum alchymiae adversus quosdam misochymicos..., Toulouse, Bosc, 1645, 128 p. Traduction française manuscrite en 1790 par le chevalier Dernelon : Rempart de l'alchimie.
- Traduction et notes du Cursus triomphalis Antimonii de Basile Valentin, Toulouse, Bosc, 1646.
- Panchymicus, seu Anatomia totius Universi Opus, Toulouse, Bosc, 1646.
- Sapientia Universalis quatuor libris comprehensa. Videlicet 1. Quid sit sapientia, & de modiis ad eam perveniendi, 2. De cognitione hominis, 3. De medentis morbis hominum, 4. De Meliorandis metallis, Toulouse, Bosc, 1654.
- Remèdes curatifs et préservatifs de la peste donnez au public en 1652 par Pierre-Jean Fabre, Réimprimé en 1720 à Toulouse, 16 p.
- Manuscriptum ad Serenissimum Fridericum...res alchymicorum explanans, 1653, édité par G. Clauder dans les Miscellanea Curiosa de l'Académie impériale léopoldine de Nuremberg, 1690; in J. J. Manget, Bibliotheca Chemica Curiosa, 1702.
- Opera reliqua volumine hoc posteriore comprehensa, Francfort, Beyer, 1652; Francfort, Beyer, 1656.

== Resources ==
- Greiner, Frank, Introduction à L'Alchimiste chrétien (Alchymista christianus), Paris, S.É.H.A. et Milan, ARCHÈ, 2001, p. VII-CXVII.
- Greiner, Frank, "Pierre-Jean Fabre", in Dictionnaire de réseaux culturels toulousains en Europe entre 1480 et 1780, Bibliotheca Tholosana
- Joly, Bernard, "La réception de la pensée de Van Helmont dans l'œuvre de Pierre-Jean Fabre", in Z.R.W.M. von Martels (éd.), Alchemy Revisited, Brill, Leiden, 1990, pp. 206–214.
- Joly, Bernard, Rationalité de l'alchimie au XVIIe siècle, Vrin, 1992.
- Joly, Bernard, "Pierre-Jean Fabre", apud The dictionary of seventeenth-century french philosophers, Thoemmes Press, 2004.
- Nelly, René, "Un médecin alchimiste : Pierre-Jean Fabre", La Tour Saint-Jacques, n° 16, Paris, 1958.
- Ricalens, Henry, "Pierre-Jean Fabre, médecin et alchimiste de Castelnaudary (1588-1658) et son traité de la peste selon la méthode des médecins spagyristes", Bulletin de la société d'études scientifiques de l'Aude, 2003, vol. CIII, p. 113-120.
- Secret, François, "Pierre-Jean Fabre, médecin spagirique et alchimiste", Bibliothèque d'humanisme et Renaissance, Genève, t. XXXV, 1973.
