= John de Charneles =

English knight and administrator

John de Charneles (Note: Also John de Charnel, Charnels.) was a 14th-century English knight and administrator who served as Keeper of the Great Wardrobe (1344), lieutenant of the Seneschal of Gascony (1351) and Constable of Bordeaux (1351).

== Life ==
Charneles was the son of William de Charneles of Bedworth and Margaret. He served as Keeper of the Great Wardrobe in 1344. Appointed on 13 September 1350, as Constable of Bordeaux. John was captured by the French in 1351 at Sainte-Foy-la-Grande and spent a period in captivity before being ransomed. He died without issue with his wife Elizabeth surviving him.
