= Bouchard de Marly =

French knight and crusader

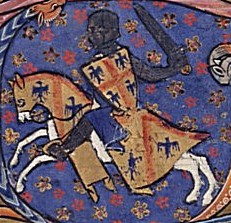
Bouchard de Marly in a 13th-century miniature from the Chansonnier du Roi

Bouchard I de Marly (c. 1180s – 1226) was a French knight and crusader, lord of Marly, Montreuil-Bonnin, Saissac, Saint-Martin-en-Languedoc and Picauville. He was a member of the Montmorency family,

== Background ==
He was the son of Mathieu, lord of Marly, and grandson of Mathieu I, baron of Montmorency. Bouchard is a Norman form of the German name Burchard, carried by his 10th-century ancestor, Bouchard I of Montmorency. His father had participated in the Fourth Crusade and, unlike the French contingent led by Simon IV of Montford, had ventured as far as Constantinople, where he died shortly after the sack of the city on 27 August 1204.

Bouchard de Marly in 1204 sponsored the foundation of the abbey of Port-Royal des Champs. In 1209, he participated in the Albigensian Crusade, where he joined Simon of Montford who was married to Alix de Montmorency, one of his cousins. In c. 1209, he married Mathilde de Châteaufort, a daughter of Gasce de Poissy, with whom he had five children, the oldest being abbot and saint Theobald of Marly.

Bouchard was given the possessions of Saissac and of Saint-Martin-en-Languedoc by Simon. In late 1209, Bouchard is captured by Pierre-Roger de Cabaret and kept as prisoner at Lastours for two years. Simon laid siege to Lastours in the spring of 1211, and Pierre-Roger de Cabaret released Bouchard as an emissary presenting his terms of surrender. Bouchard then participated in the siege of Lavaur (May 1211), and relieved Simon at the siege of Castelnaudary. He was present at Simon's siege of Toulouse (June 1211), the Battle of Muret (12 September 1213) and the second siege of Toulouse (1217/8). Simon died when this siege was in its ninth month, on 25 June 1218, and Bouchard now followed Simon's son, Amaury VI de Montfort, and later participated in the renewed crusade declared by Louis VIII of France in 1225. He was killed in this campaign, during Louis' siege of Avignon, on 13 September 1226. He was buried at Port-Royal des Champs.

Bouchard used the coat of arms of the lords of Montmorency, or a cross gules, quarterly four eagles (alerions?) azure, attested (without tincture) in a heraldic seal used in 1225.

He was succeeded as lord of Marly, Montreuil-Bonnin and Picauville by his son Pierre (d. 1240), who was in turn succeeded by his younger brother, Bouchard II (d. 1250). Bouchard II was succeeded by his son, Mathieu II, Grand Chamberlain of France (d. 1280). Mathieu II was succeeded by his son, Mathieu III (d. 1305), who was in turn succeeded by his son, Louis de Marly. Louis died without issue in c. 1356, and the possession of Marly and Picauville passed to the House of Lévis. Marly was acquired by Louis XIV in 1676, from which time it came to be known as Marly-le-Roi.

== Bibliography ==
- Dominique Paladilhe, Simon de Montfort, Librairie Académique Perrin, 1988, p. 140.
- Anselme de Sainte-Marie, Ange de Sainte-Rosalie, Histoire de la Maison Royale de France, et des grands officiers de la Couronne (1728), p. 657.
