= Arboretum du Lampy =

Arboretum in Le Lampy-Neuf, France

Coordinates: 43.36°N 2.169°E

The Arboretum du Lampy, also known as the Arboretum du Domaine du Lampy-Neuf, is a private arboretum located in Le Lampy-Neuf, Saissac, Aude, Languedoc-Roussillon, France. It is open daily.

The arboretum was first established in the 19th century as the Canal du Midi administration's experimental site for exotic trees. After forty years of neglect, restoration began in 1995. Older trees include araucarias, Lawson cypresses, sequoiadendrons, thujas, and Virginia tulip trees; these have been augmented with new plantings of cedar of Lebanon, Ginkgo biloba, liquidambar, Negundo maple, etc.

== See also ==
- List of botanical gardens in France
