= Martin Algai =

French mercenary captain (fl. 1196–1212)

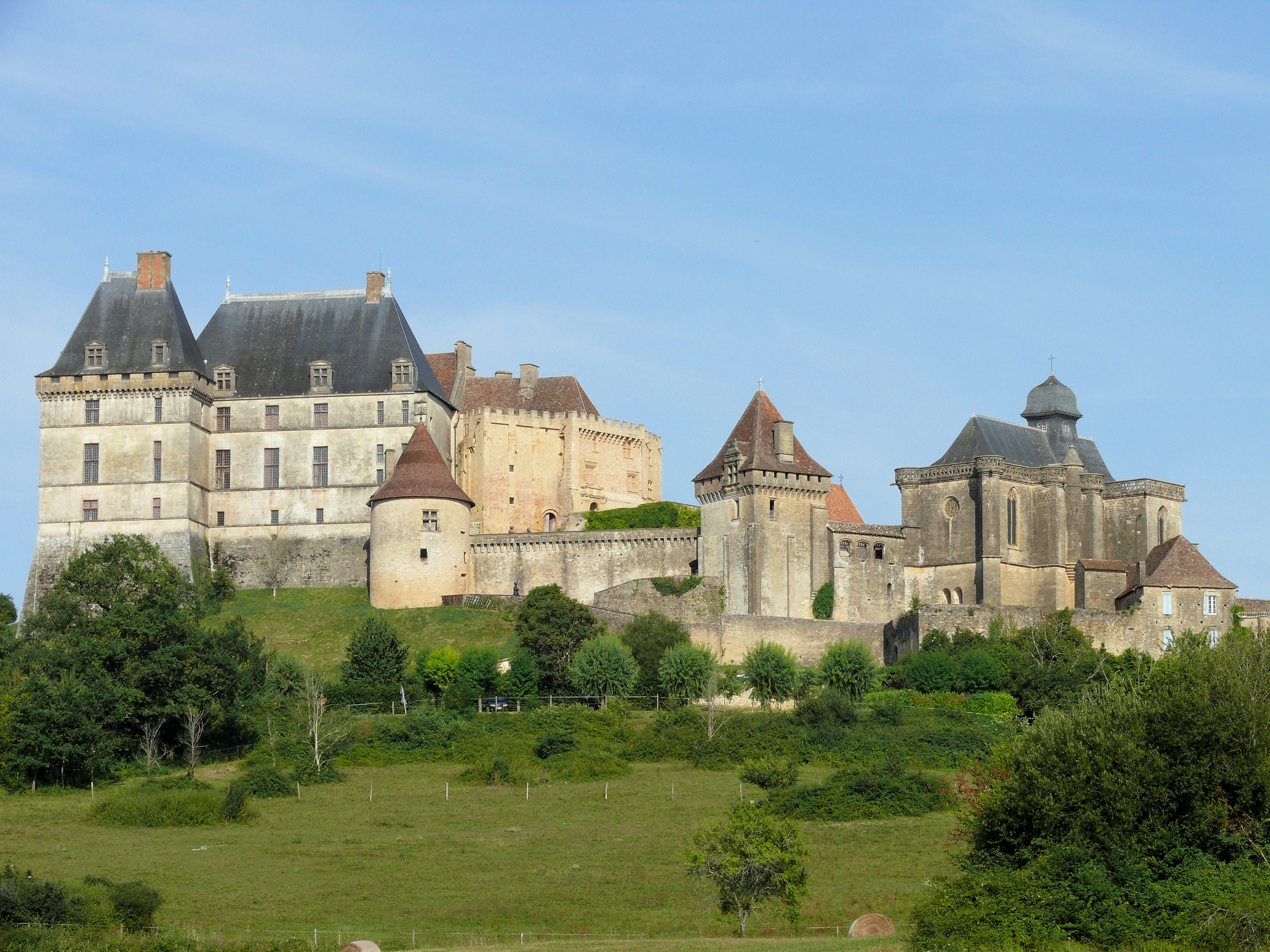
- Martin Algai's castle, Chateau de Biron
- Born: 1100s Kingdom of Navarre
- Died: July 1212; Chateau de Biron, France
- Military career
- Allegiance: Kingdom of England; Simon de Montfort
- Service years: 1196–1211
- Occupation: Highwayman; Mercenary captain Seneschal of Gascony and Périgord
- Conflicts: First Hundred Years' War; Albigensian Crusade

Martin Algai (1100s - 1212), otherwise Martin Algeis or Martin Algais, was a Navarrese routier, Seneschal of Gascony and Périgord, and participant in the Albigensian Crusade. He fought for the crusaders at the Battle of Saint-Martin-Lalande but fled the battlefield. He was executed by Simon de Montfort in 1212 when the Castle of Biron was besieged by the crusaders.

== Early life ==
Martin was originally from Navarre. He was a highwayman who led a group of cavalry and footmen along with his three brothers. In 1196 he was employed as a mercenary by King Richard I of England. After Richard's death in 1199, Martin continued to serve under King John of England. His success during this time is evidenced by several letters written by King John referencing plunder and prisoners taken by Martin. Martin was held in high regard by King John who wrote "We esteem the service of Martin Algais more highly than any other person."

In November of 1202, Martin was defeated and captured while fighting against forces loyal to King Philip II of France. Fearful that without their captain, Martin's mercenaries might leave or join his enemies, King John informed them that he would do everything in his power to pay Martin's ransom and that their continued service would be rewarded. Part of Martin's release included a guarantee not to attack the lands of his captors, which meant he would be unable to make money through plundering their land. Due to this, Martin requested that King John also give him compensation that would allow him to continue paying his mercenaries.

As a reward for his service and to give him a new source of income, King John invested him with political office. On December 4, 1202 he was appointed Seneschal of Gascony and Périgord. His tenure as seneschal was brief and lasted until at least April 26, 1205. In 1206 he married into the Gontaut family and acquired the Castle of Biron.

== Albigensian Crusade and Death ==
In 1211 he took part in the Albigensian Crusade as a mercenary captain. He joined a crusader army reinforcing Simon de Montfort at the Siege of Castelnaudary while leading 20 knights. The army was intercepted by a larger Occitan force, culminating in the Battle of Saint-Martin-Lalande. Despite the crusader victory, Martin feared the battle was lost and fled the field with his men at the opening of the engagement. Having betrayed the crusaders, he made peace with the main enemy of the crusade, Raymond VI, Count of Toulouse. Martin was entrusted by Raymond to hold the Castle of Biron, though he remained neutral in the conflict. Instead he used the castle as a base to raid his neighbors.

In July of 1212 Simon de Montfort was campaigning in the region and was only 20 miles from Biron after besieging Penne-d'Agenais. During this time complaints about Martin's attacks reached the crusade leader. He decided to use the opportunity to take revenge against Martin and make him into an example for others who might desert. He besieged Biron and was able to completely surround the castle and take the surrounding suburb. Simon negotiated with the garrison and agreed to spare them if they handed over Martin, which they did. Martin was allowed to confess his sins before he was tied to a horse, dragged through the army, and hanged.

== Bibliography ==
- Marvin, Laurence W. (2008). The Occitan War: A Military and Political History of the Albigensian Crusade, 1209-1218. Cambridge, UK: Cambridge University Press. doi:10.1017/CBO9780511496561. ISBN 978-0521123655. Full access available to users of The Wikipedia Library.
- Sumption, Jonathan (1999). The Albigensian Crusade. London, UK: Faber. ISBN 978-0571200023.
- Hardy, Thomas Duffus (1835). Rotuli litterarum patentium in Turri Londinensi asservati. London, UK: Eyre & Spottiswoode.
- Haverkamp, Alfred; Vollrath, Hanna; Leyser, Karl (1996). England and Germany in the High Middle Ages (PDF). London, UK: German Historical Institute London. ISBN 0199205043.
- Richard, Alfred (1903). Histoire des comtes de Poitou, 778-1204. Vol. 2 (1126–1204). Paris, France: A. Picard et fils.
- Blumberg, Arnold (2011). "Monarchs and Mercenaries: The Use of Soldiers for Hire by English Kings in the High Middle Ages". Medieval Warfare. 1 (2). Netherlands: Karwansaray BV: 18–23. ISSN 2211-5129. JSTOR 48577838. Full access available to users of The Wikipedia Library.
- Richardson, H. G. (1959). "The Letters and Charters of Eleanor of Aquitaine". The English Historical Review. 74 (291). Cambridge, UK: The English Historical Review: 193–213. ISSN 0013-8266. JSTOR 558439. Full access available to users of The Wikipedia Library.
- Kastner, L. E. (1937). "Notes on the Poems of Bertran de Born". The Modern Language Review. 32 (2). Cambridge, UK: Modern Humanities Research Association: 169–221. doi:10.2307/3716018. ISSN 0026-7937. JSTOR 3716018. Full access available to users of The Wikipedia Library.
