= Grand Bassin =

Body of open water along the Canal du Midi

Coordinates: 43.31389°N 1.95673°E

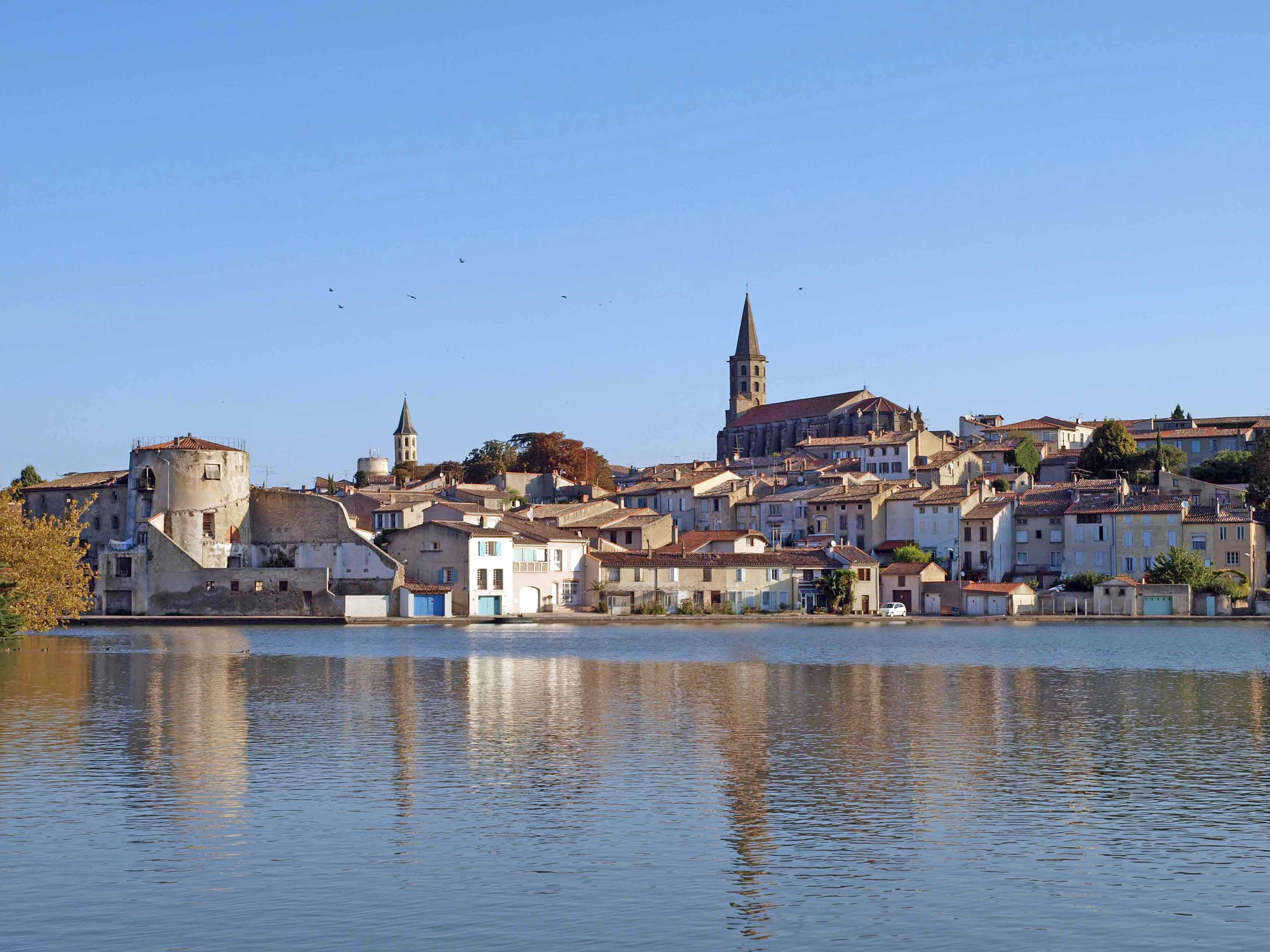
Castelnaudary's Grand Bassin

The Grand Bassin is the largest body of open water along the Canal du Midi. It is in Castelnaudary, France and covers some 7 hectares (17 acres). Once a scene of intense economic activity, it is now a major pleasure port used by tourist craft. It holds the water reserve for the four locks of Saint-Roche.

Official opening ceremonies for the Canal du Midi were held here on 19 May 1681.

The basin is exposed to considerable winds, historically even blowing horses and men into the water. A windbreak called Cybele Island (French: Ile de la Cybelle) was built in 1754.

== Gallery ==
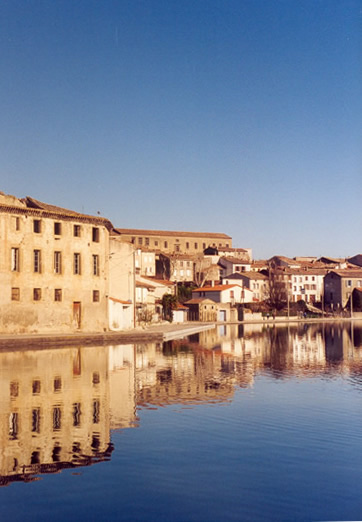
Grand Bassin at Castelnaudary.

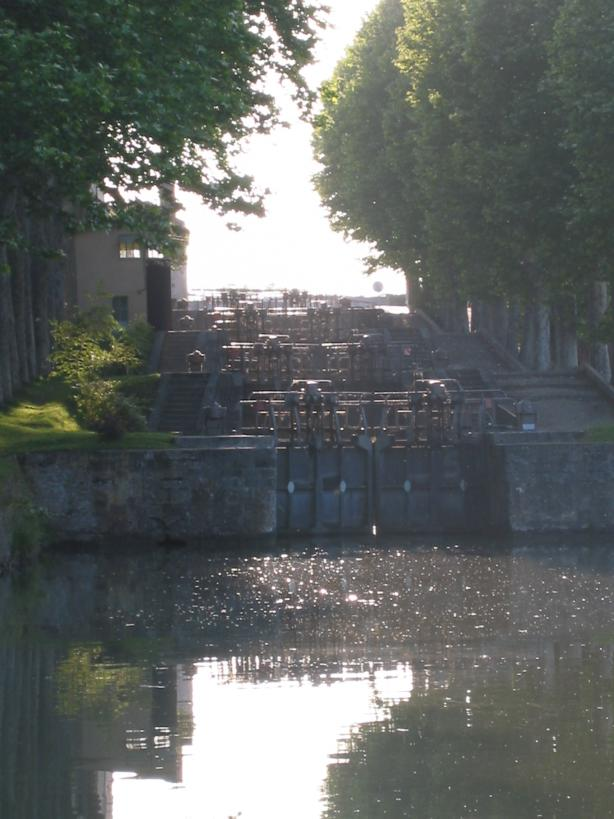
Four-step locks at Castelnaudary.
