= John de Hausted =

13th-14th century English nobleman

Arms of John Hausted, displayed during Tournament of Dunstable in 1308: Argent on a bend vert, three eagles or.

John de Hausted (died 1337) was a 13th-14th century English nobleman who fought in both the Anglo-French War and in the First War of Scottish Independence.

Hausted was the second son of Robert de Hausted of Horpole. During 1307, John received a grant of the manor of Deusangre, other lands in Northumberland. In 1317, Hausted was in the Scotch expedition of King Edward II of England and was invested with the power of receiving into protection all those who in Northumberland who submitted to the authority of the king. In 1323, he held the castle and honour of Clare, Suffolk. After the coronation of King Edward III, he was appointed to the office of Seneschal of Gascony, serving between 1327 until 1331. Hausted was summoned to parliament between 20 July 1332 to 22 January 1336, as Baron Hausted. He died in 1337.

== Marriage and issue ==
Hausted married Roese and had the following known issue:

- Elizabeth de Hausted
- William de Hausted (died 1345), without surviving issue.
