= Seneschal of the Saintonge =

Official position in medieval Saintonge, France

The Seneschal of the Saintonge was an officer carrying out and managing the domestic affairs of the lord of the district of the Saintonge, a province of France in the late Middle Ages. During the course of the twelfth century, the seneschalship, also became an office of military command.

The seneschal managed the household, coordinating between the receivers of various landholdings and the chamber, treasury, and the chancellory or chapel. The seneschals of the Saintonge, like those appointed in Normandy, Poitou, and Anjou had custody of demesne fortresses, the regional treasuries, and presidency of the highest court of regional custom.

== List of Seneschals ==
- Savari de Mauléon (c.1212)
- Philippe de Rémi (1250)
- Rostand de Soliers (1295)
- Pier de Ferrières (1323)
- Guichard d'Angle (1350)
- John Harpeden I (1372)
- John Harpeden II (1399)
