= Thomas d'Ippegrave =

English official

- Died: 1270s
- Occupation: Official
- Known for: Service in the household of Edward I of England, Seneschal of Gascony
- Spouse: Joan

Thomas d'Ippegrave (Note: Also Thomas de Ippegrave, Thomas of Ippegrave or Thomas Ippegrave.) was an English official who had "a career fairly characteristic of the more capable clerks" in the household of the Lord Edward, future Edward I of England. He was a member of the Privy Council of Ireland in 1264, served as Constable of the Tower and Lord Mayor of London in 1268 and then served as Seneschal of Gascony from 1268 until 1269.

Although he had professional training as a lawyer, Thomas began his governmental career as a minor clerk in the Lord Edward's household. He can be seen acting in connection with the Duchy of Gascony, which belonged to Edward, as early as 1255. He rose to the position of keeper of the wardrobe for Edward by 1259, perhaps originally working as the deputy of the previous keeper, Ralph de Donjon. As keeper of the wardrobe, he received and disbursed money on Edward's behalf.

In 1259 he was in Gascony in his capacity as a former lawyer to assist the king's lieutenant for Gascony, Simon de Montfort, 6th Earl of Leicester. He had by that time become a knight and was appointed by King Henry III along with another knight and a clerk to defend the Crown against the lawsuit brought by Renaud II de Pons and his wife, Marguerite de Turenne. This was the first case from Gascony that was appealed to the parlement of Paris. Thomas had returned to the Lord Edward's service by January 1260, and he visited France in Edward's entourage in November 1260.

Thomas was sent on a "special mission" to Ireland in 1264, during which he sat with the other members of the king's Secretum Consilium (privy council). The purpose of his mission was to take part in the inquest into allegations that the Archbishop of Dublin was interfering with pleas to the Crown. His stay in Ireland was short. By early 1265 he had returned to England. There he supervised the collection of a tallage (tax) on the Jews.

Thomas was appointed seneschal before 21 November 1268, when as seneschal he witnessed the signing of the marriage contract between Henry of Almain, the king's nephew, and Constance of Béarn, a leading Gascon heiress. He then issued a writ confirming the contract, formally releasing Constance from the patria potestas of her father, Viscount Gaston VII of Béarn, and recognising her seisin of the viscounties of Brulhois and Gabardan, which were to be her dowry at the time of her marriage. Part of the significance of this writ is that it shows that at the time the suzerainty of the Duke of Gascony over the Viscount of Béarn was not disputed and covered the whole of the viscountcy.

Thomas appears to have been one of only two of fourteen seneschals of Gascony that Edward himself appointed during the lifetime of his father, who appointed all the others. (Note: The other was Jean I de Grailly.) He was replaced as seneschal sometime between March and November 1269. Thomas was granted the position of serjeant of Eastgate in the city of Chester as well as the tolls in 1275. Thomas's widow Joan was granted the custody and tolls of the gate in 1278, which she then surrendered to the crown, in return for a pension.
