= John Harpeden I =

English knight and administrator

Arms of Harpedenne, lords of Montaigu and Belleville: Gyronny of twelve gules and vair

Sir John Harpeden (or Harpsden; French: Jean Harpedenne) was an English knight and administrator who served Edward III of England in France during the Hundred Years' War. He served as seneschal of Saintonge (1371–72) and seneschal of Aquitaine (1385–89). His descendants became French lords. He is called John Harpeden I or John Harpeden the Elder to distinguish him from his son, Jean Harpedenne II.

== Seneschal of Saintonge (1371–72) ==
Harpeden was the seneschal of Saintonge during the Aquitanian lieutenancy of the king's son, John of Gaunt, in 1370–71. When the lieutenant was returning to England in September 1371, he left the castle of La Roche-sur-Yon in the joint possession of John Harpeden, Thomas Percy and Renaud de Vivonne. They agreed to pay for its upkeep out of their own revenues and to render an annual rent of 500 marks to the Edward, Duke of Aquitaine, which they could raise from the forfeitures of traitors and the profits of raiding French territory.

Harpeden was still seneschal of Saintonge on behalf of the Duke of Aquitaine in June 1372. When the flotilla of the Earl of Pembroke was blockaded in La Rochelle by a Castilian fleet, he worked through the night of 22/23 June to procure reinforcements. He managed to gather some Gascon men-at-arms from nearby garrisons and commandeered four barges. He also sent messengers to the Captal de Buch and Thomas Felton urging them to send reinforcements as well. The men of La Rochelle, however, refused to provide their ships. He reached Pembroke's ships shortly before dawn. In the ensuing battle, the English were defeated and Harpeden was captured.

Harpeden was only released from captivity in 1378. According to a rumour, certainly apocryphal, he was granted his freedom because he had volunteered to defend the divinity of Christ in single combat against two "Ethiopian" heathens.

== Seneschal of Aquitaine (1385–89) ==
Harpeden returned to France in 1385, being appointed seneschal of Aquitaine (or Gascony) by Richard II on 1 March 1385. He replaced William le Scrope. Unlike Scrope was forced to rely entirely on local revenues, receiving no money from the Exchequer for the defence of the province.

According to a report from the Duke of Berry's councillors in Toulouse, Harpeden went on the offensive early against the French. The Anglo-Gascon free companies were given free rein and increased their raids dramatically. The Durforts under Gaillard II, who would later serve as seneschal himself, attacked the Agenais with 500 men-at-arms in coordination with Harpeden's diplomacy. The seneschal negotiated with the lords of the Agenais to induce them into English allegiance. He even distributed circular letters throughout the province enjoining submission to Richard II. By the fall of 1386, he had established control over most of the Agenais and Quercy.

When the French went on the offensive late in the summer of 1387, Harpeden organized the simultaneous defence of the Gironde from a royal invasion and the Agenais from the Count of Armagnac.

Harpeden's successor, John Trailly, was named on 25 June 1389.

== Marriage and issue ==
Harpeden married firstly Katherine, daughter of Guy Senechal of Morthemer and Radégonde Bechet. It is not known whether there was any issue from this marriage.

In the 1360s, Harpeden married, as his second wife, Jeanne, daughter of Olivier IV de Clisson and Jeanne de Belleville and thus a younger sister of Olivier V. She had inherited some land on the death of her father in 1343. His son was raised in the household of Olivier V as a Poitevin. It is unlikely that father and son ever saw each other again after 1372. When Harpeden returned to France in 1385, his son was a courtier at the court of Charles VI.

== Bibliography ==
- Vale, Malcolm; Pépin, Guilhem (2014). "Seneschals of Gascony, of Aquitaine after 1360 (1273–1453)". The Gascon Rolls Project (1317–1468).
- Henneman, John Bell (1996). Olivier de Clisson and Political Society in France Under Charles V and Charles VI. University of Pennsylvania Press.
- Sumption, Jonathan (2009). The Hundred Years War, III: Divided Houses. Faber and Faber.
