= Raymond-Roger of Foix =

13th-century French nobleman

Raymond-Roger
- Count of Foix
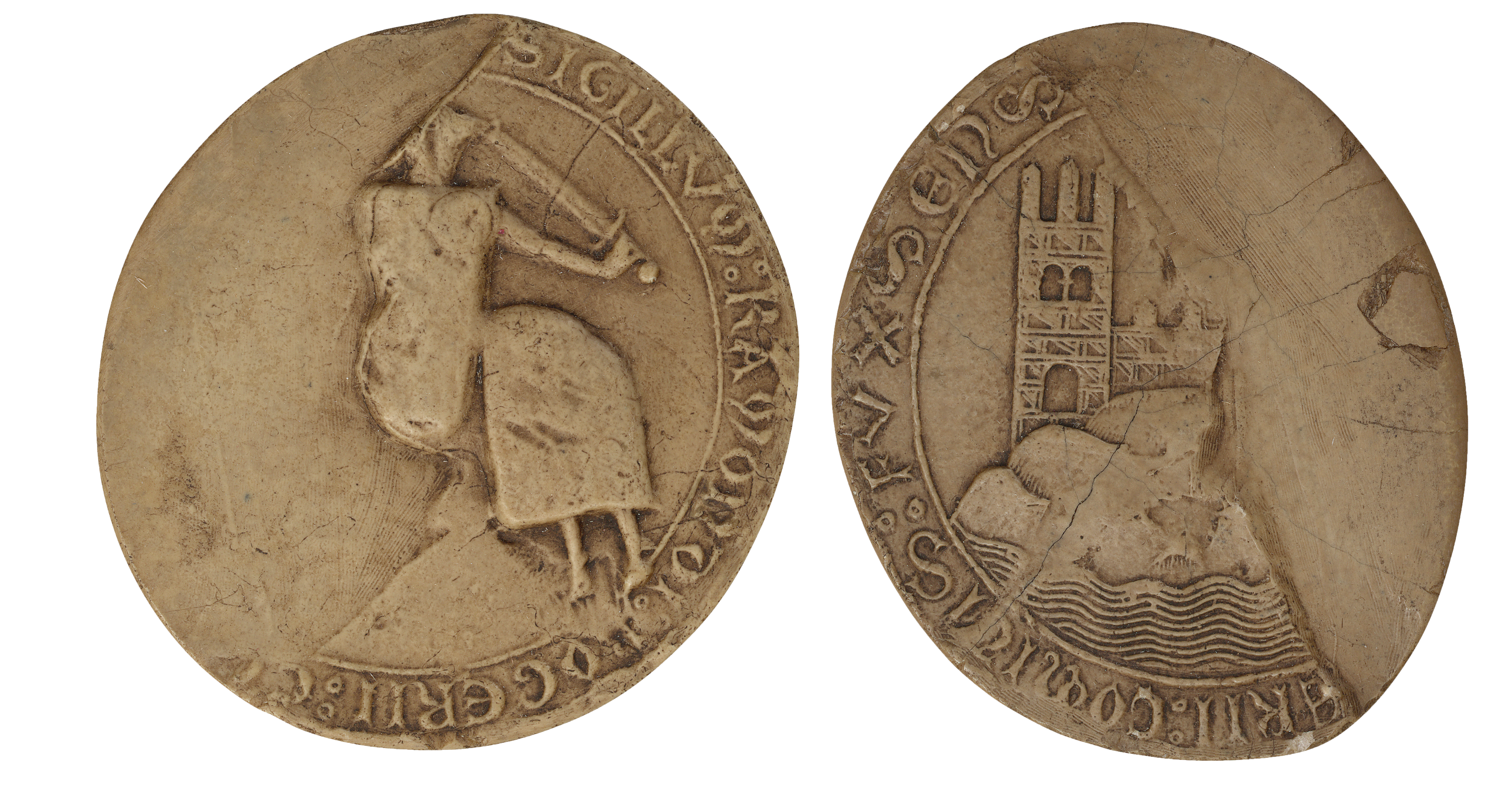
- Seal of Raymond-Roger, Count of Foix

Count of Foix
- Reign: 1188 - 1223
- Predecessor: Roger-Bernard I
- Successor: Roger-Bernard II
- Born: c. 1150
- Died: 27 March 1223; Mirepoix
- Noble family: Foix
- Spouse: Philippa of Montcada
- Issue: Roger-Bernard II; Cécile de Foix
- Father: Roger-Bernard I
- Mother: Cécilia Trencavel

Raimond Roger (French: Raymond-Roger; Occitan: Ramon Roger) (died 27 March 1223) was the sixth Count of Foix from the House of Foix. He was the son and successor of Roger Bernard I and his wife Cécilia Trencavel.

== Early Life and Rule ==
In 1188, he succeeded his father as Count of Foix. When Raimond Roger and Arnaud, viscount of Castelbon, wished to join their possessions, the Count Ermengol VIII of Urgell and Bernard de Villemur, bishop of Urgell, saw in this a threat and declared war. Overcome and captured, the count of Foix and Arnaud were imprisoned from February to September 1203. King Peter II of Aragón intervened, however, wishing to spare them for his fight to conquer Languedoc. Moreover, Peter II gave as a fief the castles of Trenton and Quérigut (1209) to Raimond Roger, after having already given various other Catalan seigniories (1208).

Raimond Roger was a close relative and staunch ally of Raymond VI of Toulouse. He was famed for his generalship, chivalry, fidelity, and affection for haute couture. He was also a patron of troubadours and an author of verse himself. Though not a Cathar himself, several of his relatives were. His wife, Philippa of Montcada, even became a parfaite. His sister, Esclarmonde de Foix, was also a parfaite, receiving the Consolamentum at Fanjeaux in 1204.

== Albigensian Crusade ==
During the Albigensian Crusade he defeated a contingent of German and Frisian crusaders at the Battle of Montgey in 1211. He later fought at the Battle of Saint-Martin-Lalande in 1211 and the Battle of Muret in 1213 where he was defeated in both. Raymond Roger attended the Fourth Lateran Council of 1215 to defend Raymond of Toulouse before Pope Innocent III and the council. He was accused of having murdered priests and did not deny it; instead he informed the pope that he regretted not having murdered more. He took part in the 2nd Siege of Toulouse in 1218 and in 1219 participated in the Battle of Baziège where he defeated a Crusader army.

== Death ==
After the Battle of Baziège, Raymond Roger continued to resist the crusader forces. on 27 March 1223, He died of an ulcer while besieging the Castle of Mirepoix.

== Children ==
He had two children with Philippa of Montcada:

- Roger-Bernard who became his heir.
- Cécile de Foix, who married Count Bernard V of Comminges c. 1224.

He also had two illegitimate children.

== Notes ==
Preceded by Roger Bernard I	Count of Foix; 1188–1223	Succeeded by Roger Bernard II
