= Alerion =

Heraldic bird

Heraldic representation

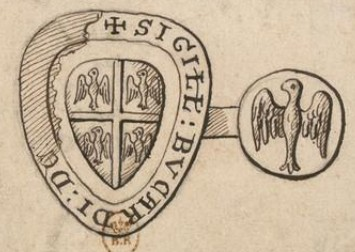
Seal of Bouchard de Marly (1225) with the coat of arms of the lords of Montmorency, or a cross gules, quarterly four alerions azure

Three alerions on Lorraine's arms

Alerion (sometimes known as Avalerion) is a term for a heraldic bird. Historically, it referred to the regular heraldic eagle. Later, heralds used the term alerion to refer to "baby eagles" or "eaglets". To differentiate them from mature eagles, alerions were shown as an eagle displayed inverted without a beak or claws (disarmed). To differentiate it from a decapitate (headless) eagle, the alerion has a bulb-shaped head with an eye staring towards the dexter (viewer's left-hand side) of the field. This was later simplified in modern heraldry as an abstract winged oval.

An example is the arms of the Duchy of Lorraine (or, on a bend gules, 3 alerions abaisé argent). It supposedly had been inspired by the assumed arms of crusader Geoffrey de Bouillon, according to a tale that he killed three white eaglets with a bow and arrow when out hunting. It is far more likely to be canting arms that are a pun based on Lorraine / Erne. (alerion is a partial anagram of Lorraine).

Medieval bestiaries use alerion for a mythological bird described as somewhat larger than an eagle of which only a single pair was said to live at any time. A pair of eggs was laid every 60 years; after hatching, the parents drowned themselves. The term avalerion is used on the Hereford Map near the Hydaspes and the Indus, possibly based on a description by Pliny.

The word's ultimate origin is unclear, possibly adapted from the German Adler or Adelar ("eagle"). It is found in 12th-century French as alérion and in medieval Latin as alariōnem (a large eagle-like bird).

== See also ==
- Eagle (heraldry)
- Double-headed eagle
- Triple-headed eagle
- Phoenix
