= John Trailly =

English soldier and diplomat

Arms of Trailly:Or, a cross between four marlets gules

John Trailly (died 18 June 1400), Lord of Furnells and Yeldon, Seneschal of Gascony, Mayor of Bordeaux, was an English soldier and diplomat.

== Life ==
Trailly was the eldest son of John Trailly (died 1360) and Elizabeth. John was involved in the French campaigns of Kings Richard II and Henry IV of England during the Hundred Years' War. He was member of Parliament for Bedfordshire in 1377 and 1381. He was a member of Thomas of Woodstock, Earl of Buckingham's retinue in 1377 and went with John of Gaunt, Duke of Lancaster to Spain in 1386. John was Seneschal of Gascony between 1389 and 1390 and in 1397 and was Mayor of Bordeaux between 1389 and 1400.

== Marriage and issue ==
John married Joan, daughter of Thomas Aylesbury and Joan Basset, they had the following known issue:

- Reynold Trailly (died 1401), without issue.
