= Jean Harpedenne II =

French aristocrat, administrator and military officer

Jean Harpedenne II (or John Harpeden II; fl. 1360s–1410s) was a French aristocrat, administrator and military officer. He was the seigneur of Belleville and a Marmouset at the court of King Charles VI.

Jean was the only son of the English knight John Harpeden and his French wife, Jeanne, daughter of Olivier IV de Clisson and Jeanne de Belleville and thus a younger sister of Olivier V. Jean was born in the 1360s and was raised in the household of Olivier V. Jean, who was by language and upbringing a French Poitevin, is unlikely to have seen his father after 1372, when his father was captured in battle by the French.

Jean came into possession of his father's estates around Belleville in Poitou in 1372, although he was under the control of his uncle at that time. He is the source for the story that Olivier V de Clisson, while serving as constable of France, would annually remind the minor-aged Charles VI that he was a year closer to assuming full powers By 1385, Jean had become prominent at the royal court. In that year he served as seneschal of Périgord. His descendants would continue to serve in the French military into the 20th century.

Jean supported Louis I, Duke of Orléans, in the dispute over the regency for Charles VI after the latter was declared insane in 1393. He became Louis's chamberlain and in 1399 Louis appointed him seneschal of Saintonge. In 1402, during a period of lucidity, Charles VI dismissed his uncle, John, Duke of Berry, from the regency and appointed Louis. According to the Grandes Chroniques de France, the duke learned about his dismissal from Jean Harpedenne. When Louis was preparing to march on Paris in August 1405, Jean recruited troops in the Pale of Calais and joined Louis at Melun.

Jean married Joan, daughter of Raimond de Montaut, lord of Mussidan and Blaye, a short time before her father's death in July 1406. By his will Raimond had designated Joan's unmarried sister Marie as his heiress and required her to remain loyal to the English crown. Her mother, Margaret of Albret, was the cousin of the constable of France, Charles d'Albret. She had custody of her daughter and took refuge in Mussidan, which her cousin soon besieged. An arrangement was negotiated by Jean by which Mussidan came under a French garrison.

Jean was still living in 1413–15, when he reached agreements with Isabeau, the sister and heiress of Amaury II de Clisson.

== Bibliography ==
- Henneman, John Bell (1996). Olivier de Clisson and Political Society in France Under Charles V and Charles VI. University of Pennsylvania Press.
- Sumption, Jonathan (2009). The Hundred Years War, III: Divided Houses. Faber and Faber.
- Sumption, Jonathan (2015). The Hundred Years War, IV: Cursed Kings. Faber and Faber.
