= John de Wisham (died 1332) =

English knight and administrator

Sir John de Wysham (Note: Also John de Wysham.) (died 1332) of Little Ellingham, was an English knight and administrator who served as Constable of St Briavels Castle, Justice of North Wales, Seneschal of Gascony (1324–1325) and Captain of Berwick-upon-Tweed (1316).

== Life ==
Wysham was a son of Ralph de Wysham and Emilia. John held the position of Captain of Berwick-upon-Tweed between 13 June 1316 and 1 July 1317.

Appointed on 18 November 1324, replacing Ralph Basset of Drayton, as Seneschal of Gascony, Wysham held the position for less than one year before being replaced by Henri de Sully on 14 August 1325.

Wysham held the position of Steward of the Household to King Edward III of England from May 1328 until February 1329, when he defected to Henry of Lancaster's rebellion. He was deprived of the stewardship in the aftermath.

He died in 1332 and was buried at Clifton-upon-Teme Church, Worcestershire, England.

== Marriage and issue ==
He married Hawise, widow of John de Reydon, and the daughter of Michael de Poynings and Margery Bardolf. They are known to have had the following known issue:

- John de Wysham, married Joan, had issue.
