= Seneschal of Périgord =

The Seneschal of Périgord was an officer carrying out and managing the domestic affairs of the lord of the County of Périgord. During the course of the twelfth century, the seneschalship also became an office of military command.

The seneschal managed the household, coordinating between the receivers of various landholdings and the chamber, treasury, and the chancellory or chapel. The seneschals of Gascony, like those appointed in Normandy, Poitou, and Anjou, had custody of demesne fortresses, the regional treasuries, and presidency of the highest court of regional custom.

== List of Seneschals ==
English Seneschals

- Martin Algais (1203)
- Geoffrey Tison (1214)
- Geoffrey de Neville (1218-1219)
- Pons de Grimaud de Castelsarrazin (1234)
- Guillaume-Raimond of Saint-Didier (1253)
- Bertrand de Cardaillac (1260)
- Peter de la Rua
- Jean de la Linde (1261, 1262)
- Humbert Guidonis (1268)
- Simon de Melun (1270)
- Étienne Ferriol (1273)
- Jean I de Grailly (1280)
- Elijah de Caupene (1287, 1289)
- Arnould de Caupenne (1304,1305)
- Pierre Pelet (1311)
- Brun de La Faye (1313)
- Bernard Goudonay (1314)
- Guillaume de Toulouse (1314, 1318)
- Fulco de Rossilhone
- Guillaume Thel (1327)
- Henri de Montigny (1345)
- Élie de Pomiers (1347)
- N. Aubeynac, (1361)
- Thomas de Walkafara (1366)

French Seneschals

- Géraud de Malemort (1243)
- Pons de Ville (1246)
- Raoul de Bonnevoie (1252)
- Guillaume du Puy (1253)
- Aymeric de Malemort (1254)
- Aymeric Daneys (1256)
- Henri de Cusances (1254, 1265)
- Jordan of Valette (1258)
- Pierre de Valette (1258)
- Pierre Sergent (1263, 1264)
- Henri de Cusances (1265)
- Raoul de Trapes (1266)
- Pierre des Saules (1271)
- Ancel de Saint-Yon (1273)
- Eudes de Fazel (1275)
- Simon de Melun (1277)
- Jean de Vilette (1282)
- Jean de Montigny (1284)
- Pierre de Barbery (1285)
- Raoul de Brulhey (1287)
- Jean Arreblaye I the Old (1291, 1303)
- Guichard de Marciac (1294)
- Jean des Barres (1295)
- Guy Chevrier (1297)
- Giraud Flotte (1298)
- Géraud de Sabanac (1300)
- Jean d'Arreblaye (1303)
- Jean de L'Hospital (1305)
- P. de Monci (1307)
- Bernard de Blanchefort (before 1317)
- Jean Bertrand (1314)
- Adhemar of Archiac (1316)
- Pierre d'Arreblaye (1317)
- Jean d'Arreblaye the Younger (1319)
- Jean Bertrand (1318-1319), doubtful
- Foucaud d'Archiac (1320)
- Guillaume de Mornay (1321), doubtful
- Aymeric de Cros (1324)
- Bertrand de Roquenécade (1325), doubtful
- Jean de Varenne, lord of Vivacourt (1326), doubtful
- Jordan of Loubert (1324 to 1328)
- Guillaume de La Balme (1333)
- Pierre de Marmande (1334, 1342)
- Raymond Bertrand (1337-1338) doubtful
- Péan de Maillé (1339, 1341)
- Guillaume de la Barrière (1341-1342)
- Henri de Montigny (1342, 1345)
- Guillaume de Montfaucon, lord of Verderac (1346 to 1349)
- Guillaume de la Paye (1349)
- Geoffroi de Relaye (1349-1350)
- Guy Sénéchal, lord of Mortemer (1351)
- Arnaud of Spain, lord of Montespan (1353, 1354)
- Gérald de Saulin (1359)
- Gilbert de Dome (1360), revoked July 1360
- Hugues de Pujols (July 1360)
- Guillaume de Vayrols, lord of Albenque (1369)
- Gilbert de Dome (1370)
- Pierre de Mornay (1380)
- Perceval d'Esneval (1389)
- Aimery de Rochechouart (1391)
- Jean de Harpedenne, lord of Belleville (1392, 1396, 1398)
- Bernard de Castelbajac (1399)
- Jean de Chambrilhac (1400, 1403, 1404)
- Raymond de Salignac (1410)
- Arnaud I Bourdeille (1410, 1416)
- Pons de Beynac (Baynac) (1430, 1437, 1440)
- Jean de Barlaimont, (1452)
- Raymond de Salignac (1459)
- Pierre d'Acigné, (1461, 1466)
- Jean de La Rochefoucauld (1467, 1468)
- Antoine de Salignac (1470, 1477)
- Louis Sorbier, Seigneur Paray (1470, 1474, 1480)
- Gautier de Pérusse des Cars (1484, 1510)
- Bertrand d'Estissac (1513)
- François Green of Saint-Marsault (1523)
- Antoine de Lettes de Montpezat (1526)
- Charles de Gain, lord of Linars (1532)
- Jacques de Pérusse des Cars (1543)
- Guy Chabot, baron of Jarnac, lord of Montlieu (1546)
- Jacques Andréa, lord of Repaire-Martel (1552)
- André, viscount of Bourdeille (1572)
- Guy Bouchard, Viscount of Aubeterre (1582)
- Henri de Montpezat (1591)
- Antoine de Beaupoil of Saint-Aulaire, marquis of Lanmary (1593)
- Henri de Bourdeille, count of Bourdeille, marquis of Archiac (1593)
- Francis Marquis of Valletta, Baron of Cornusson (1632) doubtful
- François de La Cropte (1634)
- François Sicaire, marquess of Bourdeille (1641)
- François de Gontaut, baron of Biron (1651)
- Philibert Hélie de Pompadour, marquess of Laurière (1672)
- Léonard Hélie de Pompadour, marquess of Laurière (1683)
- Thibaud de La Brousse, count of Verteillac (1725)
- César-Pierre-Thibaud of La Brousse, marquess of Verteillac (1782)
