= Drogo de Barentyn =

English knight and administrator

Arms of Drogo de Barentyn (d.c.1265): Sable, three eagles or.

Sir Drogo de Barentyn (Note: Also Dru de Barentyn, Drew de Barentyn, Drogone de Barentyn, Drogonem Barentyn and Drogo de Barentin.) (died 1264 or 1265) was an English knight and administrator who served as Warden of Guernsey and Jersey, Seneschal of Gascony and Constable of Windsor Castle. He held a manor at Chalgrove, South Oxfordshire, known as Barentin's Manor.

== Life ==
Appointed in November 1247, as Seneschal of Gascony, Barentyn held the position for less than one year before being replaced by Simon de Montfort in 1248. He was also sent to Wales in 1247 by King Henry III of England. Drogo was again appointed as Seneschal in 1250, jointly with Peter de Bordeaux and later a third term in 1260. He served in Gascony in 1253 on the King's service. He was governor of the island of Guernsey and Jersey in 1235, then again from 1241 to 1252. Drogo's appointed was revoked on 24 April 1252 and was ordered to hand over the castles and islands of Guernsey and Jersey to Richard de Grey. He died without male issue, with his nephew William succeeding to his estates.

== Marriage and issue ==
He was married to Joan, and is known to have had the following known issue:

- Agnes de Barentyn, married John de Mandeville, had issue.

For his near namesake the Lord Mayor see Drugo Barentyn
