= Fanjeaux =

Commune in Occitanie, France

- Commune
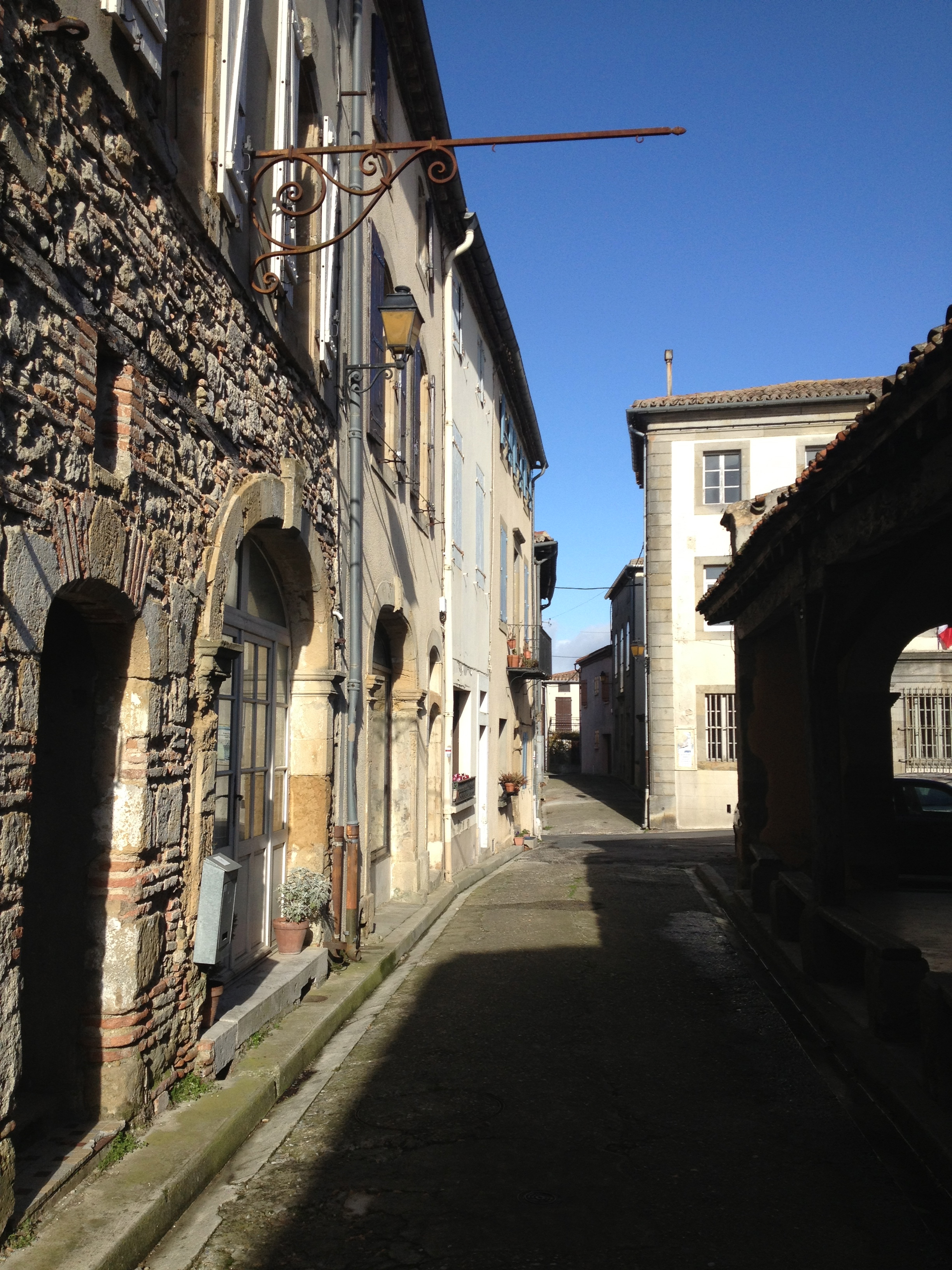
- Near the old market hall in Fanjeaux

- Coat of arms
- Location of Fanjeaux
- Location within France Location within Occitanie
- Coordinates: 43°11′16″N 2°02′04″E
- Country: France
- Region: Occitania
- Department: Aude
- Arrondissement: Carcassonne
- Canton: La Piège au Razès
- Intercommunality: Piège Lauragais Malepère

Government
  - Mayor (2020–2026): Aurélien Passemar
- Area^{1}: 25.49 km^{2} (9.84 sq mi)
- Elevation: 363 m (1,191 ft)
- Highest elevation: 395 m (1,296 ft)
- Lowest elevation: 155 m (509 ft)
- Population (2023): 885
  - Density: 34.7/km^{2} (89.9/sq mi)
- Time zone: UTC+01:00 (CET)
  - Summer (DST): UTC+02:00 (CEST)
- INSEE/Postal code: 11136 /11270
- ^{1} French Land Register data, which excludes lakes, ponds, glaciers > 1 km^{2} (0.386 sq mi or 247 acres) and river estuaries.

Fanjeaux (French pronunciation: [fɑ̃ʒo]; Occitan: Fanjaus) is a commune in the Aude department in southern France.

Fanjeaux is located west of Carcassonne. Between 1206 and 1215, Fanjeaux was the home of Saint Dominic, the founder of the Roman Catholic Church's Dominican Order, who preached to the Cathars in the area (see Catharism).

== Population ==
Historical population
Year	Pop.	±% p.a.
1968	776	—
1975	748	−0.52%
1982	778	+0.56%
1990	775	−0.05%
1999	770	−0.07%
2007	771	+0.02%
2012	785	+0.36%
2017	834	+1.22%
2023	885	+0.99%
Source: INSEE

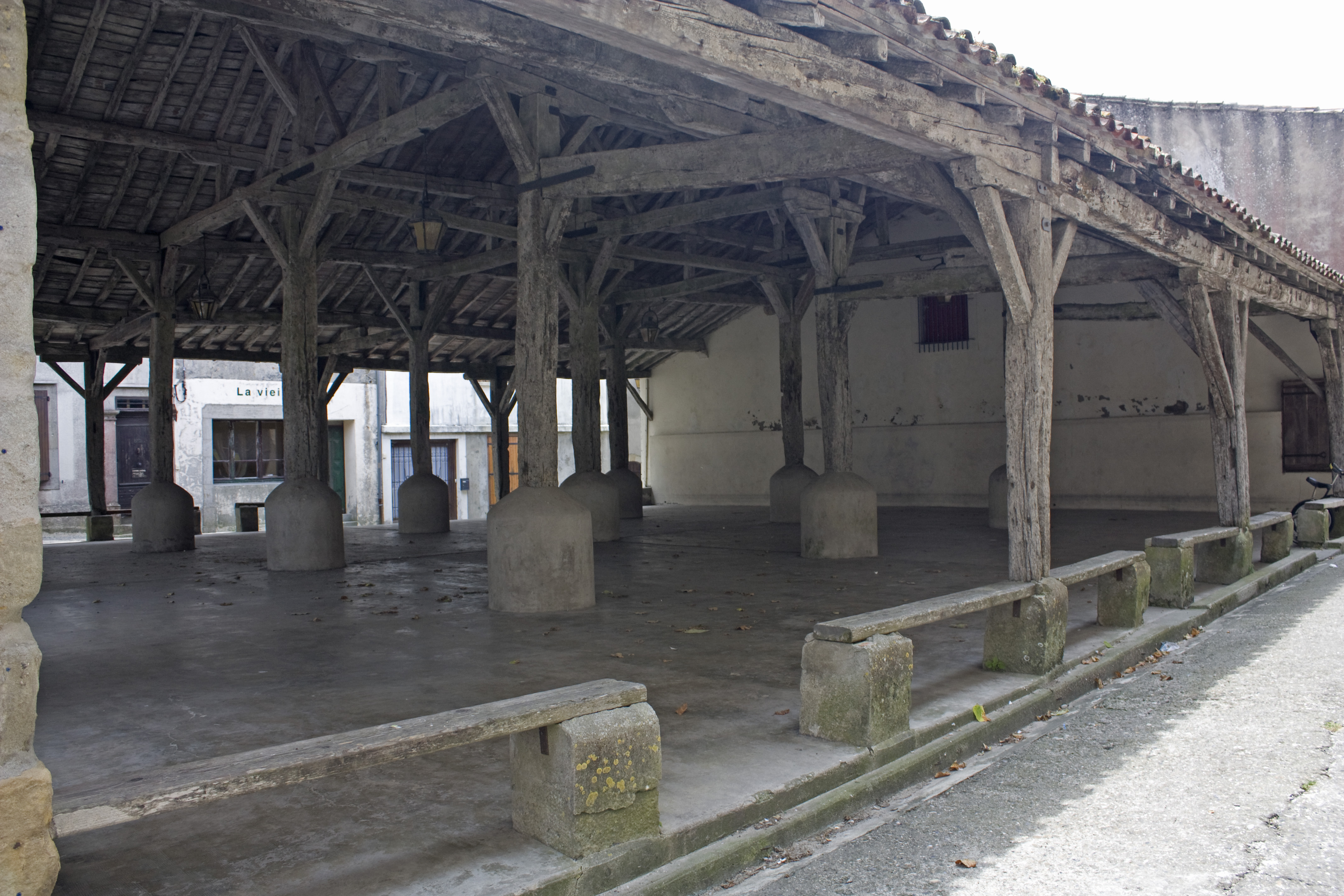
Market hall

== See also ==
- List of medieval bridges in France
- Communes of the Aude department
- Cahiers de Fanjeaux on the French Wikipedia
