= Saint-Martin-Lalande =

Commune in Occitanie, France

- Commune
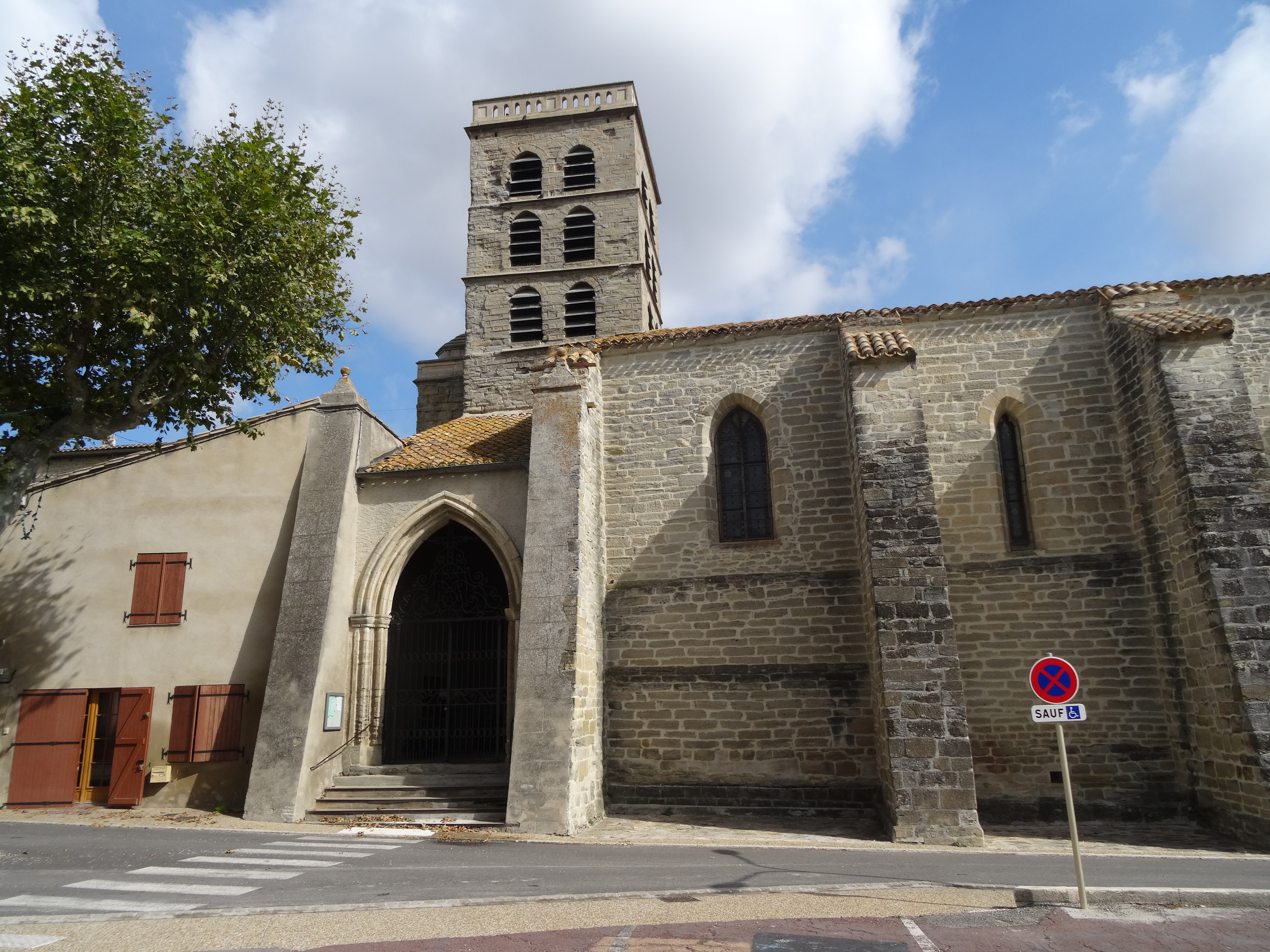
- The church in Saint-Martin-Lalande

- Coat of arms
- Location of Saint-Martin-Lalande
- Location within France Location within Occitanie
- Coordinates: 43°18′01″N 2°01′12″E
- Country: France
- Region: Occitania
- Department: Aude
- Arrondissement: Carcassonne
- Canton: Le Bassin chaurien

Government
  - Mayor (2020–2026): Guy Bondouy
- Area^{1}: 12.65 km^{2} (4.88 sq mi)
- Elevation: 145 m (476 ft)
- Highest elevation: 192 m (630 ft)
- Lowest elevation: 134 m (440 ft)
- Population (2023): 1,107
  - Density: 87.51/km^{2} (226.6/sq mi)
- Time zone: UTC+01:00 (CET)
  - Summer (DST): UTC+02:00 (CEST)
- INSEE/Postal code: 11356 /11400
- ^{1} French Land Register data, which excludes lakes, ponds, glaciers > 1 km^{2} (0.386 sq mi or 247 acres) and river estuaries.

Saint-Martin-Lalande (French pronunciation: [sɛ̃ maʁtɛ̃ la lɑ̃d]; Languedocien: Sant Martin de La Landa) is a commune in the Aude department in southern France.

== Population ==
Historical population
Year	Pop.	±% p.a.
1968	435	—
1975	419	−0.53%
1982	471	+1.69%
1990	692	+4.93%
1999	959	+3.69%
2007	1,079	+1.48%
2012	1,106	+0.50%
2017	1,124	+0.32%
2023	1,107	−0.25%
Source: INSEE

== See also ==
- Communes of the Aude department
