= Roger-Bernard II of Foix =

French noble

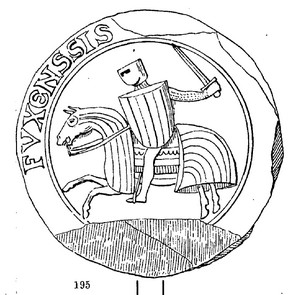

Roger Bernard II (c. 1195 – 26 May 1241), called the Great, was the seventh count of Foix from 1223 until his death. He was the son and successor of the count Raymond-Roger and his wife Philippa of Montcada.

== Life ==
In 1208, Roger-Bernard married Ermesinde, daughter and heir of Arnau de Castellbò, viscountess of Castellbò and a Cathar. By his wife, he had a son, Roger IV of Foix, and a daughter, Cecilia of Foix. Cecilia of Foix married Álvaro, Count of Urgell. When his relations with his French sovereign allowed it, he concentrated on expansion and fortification southwards. He fortified the towns guarding the way to Andorra and Urgel, and fell into conflict with the bishop of Urgel over the valley of Caboet in May 1233. He opposed the Inquisition and got into even more conflict with the bishop in April 1239. He did not involve himself in the war of Raymond Trencavel, though he did negotiate an honourable treaty in 1240.

=== Albigensian crusade ===
He made his name famous in 1217 when, for six weeks, he defended the castle of Montgrenier against the onslaught of Simon de Montfort, 5th Earl of Leicester. That same year, he distinguished himself at the siege of Toulouse. In 1220, he assisted his father in the recapture of Lavaur and Puylaurens and was instrumental in helping his father retake his lost dominions. The resumption of Mirepoix wasn't accomplished until his own reign, however.

At the moment of his accession, he and the new count of Toulouse, Raymond VII, besieged Carcassonne. On 14 September 1224, the Albigensian Crusaders surrendered and the war came to an end, each southern lord making peace with the church. However, in 1226, the new king of France, Louis VIII, called the Lion, renewed the conflict in order to enforce his royal rights in Languedoc. Roger-Bernard tried to keep the peace, but the king rejected his embassy and the counts of Foix and Toulouse took up arms again. Roger-Bernard and a small contingent of his feudatories constituted a pocket of resistance in Limoux from June 1226 to June 1227, but the war was largely a discontinuous series of skirmishes. In January 1229, Raymond of Toulouse signed the Treaty of Meaux with Louis the Lion's successor, Louis IX. Already excommunicated (since March or April 1227) and with his only ally gone and a new royal army in the field against him, Roger-Bernard sued for peace in June. By the ensuing treaty, he received back much of his land, but not Mirepoix, which he had previously fought so hard to reconquer.

=== Death ===
Roger-Bernard ended his days at peace with the established church, having been excommunicated a second time in 1236. He took the habit at the abbey of Boulbonne, and was buried there in 1241. He was succeeded by his son Roger IV, whom he had married to Brunissende, the daughter of Raymond Folc IV and heiress of Viscounty of Cardona.

== Notes ==
Preceded by Raymond Roger	Count of Foix; 1223–1241	Succeeded by Roger IV
