= Castelnaudary =

Commune in Occitanie, France

- Commune
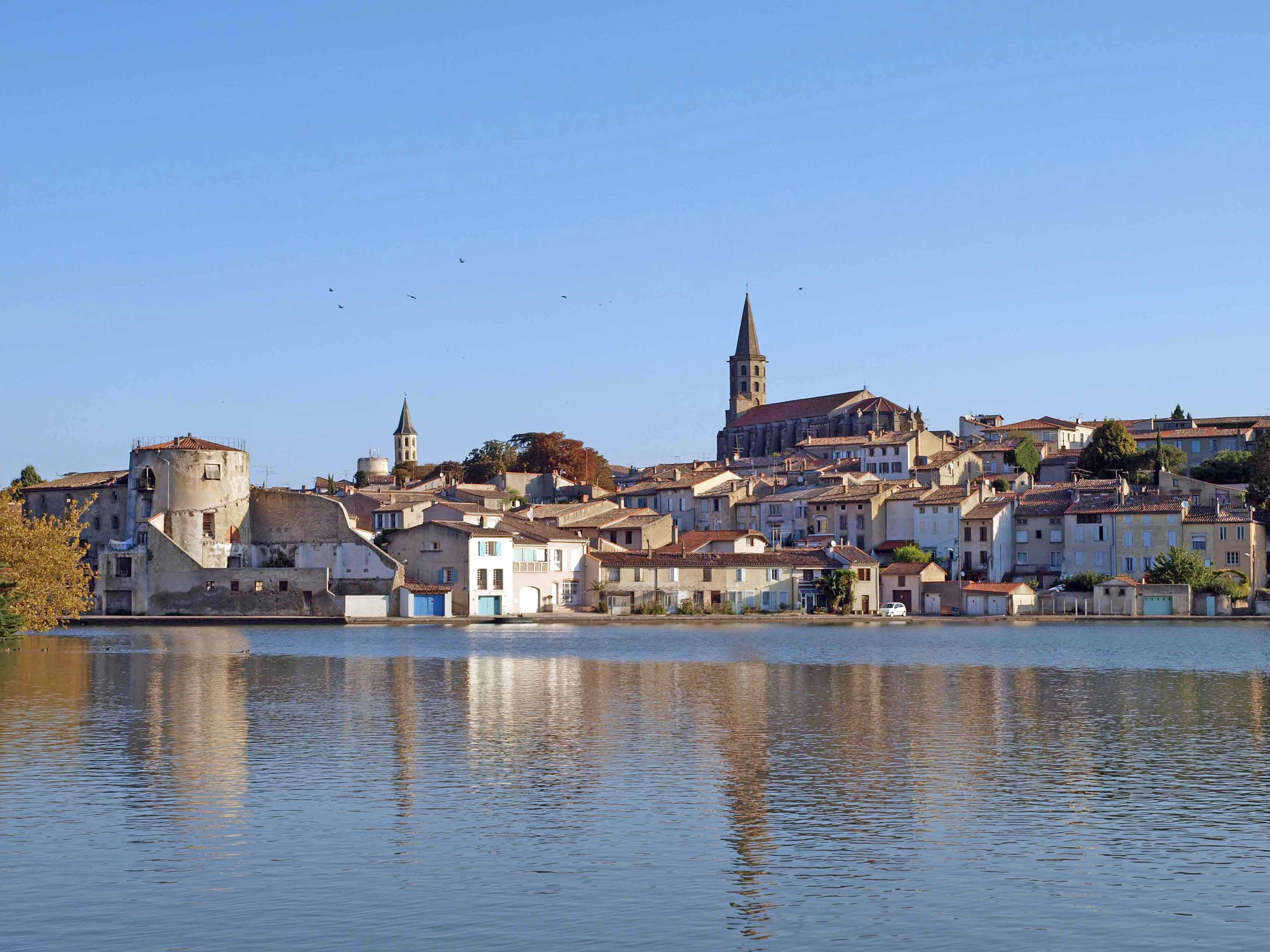
- A general view of Castelnaudary

- Coat of arms
- Location of Castelnaudary
- Location within France Location within Occitanie
- Coordinates: 43°19′09″N 1°57′16″E
- Country: France
- Region: Occitania
- Department: Aude
- Arrondissement: Carcassonne
- Canton: Le Bassin chaurien
- Intercommunality: Castelnaudary Lauraguais Audois

Government
  - Mayor (2020–2026): Patrick Maugard (PS)
- Area^{1}: 47.72 km^{2} (18.42 sq mi)
- Elevation: 165 m (541 ft)
- Highest elevation: 215 m (705 ft)
- Lowest elevation: 145 m (476 ft)
- Population (2023): 12,151
  - Density: 254.6/km^{2} (659.5/sq mi)
- Time zone: UTC+01:00 (CET)
  - Summer (DST): UTC+02:00 (CEST)
- INSEE/Postal code: 11076 /11400
- ^{1} French Land Register data, which excludes lakes, ponds, glaciers > 1 km^{2} (0.386 sq mi or 247 acres) and river estuaries.

Castelnaudary (French: [kastɛlnodɑʁi]; Occitan: Castèlnòu d'Arri) is a commune in the Aude department in the Occitanie region of southern France. It is located in the former province of the Lauragais and famous for cassoulet of which it claims to be the world capital, and of which it is a major producer.

== Geography ==
Castelnaudary is a market town, and the capital of the territory of Lauragais. The town is located 50 kilometers (31 miles) southeast of Toulouse, about midway along the route from that city to the Mediterranean. This route has been used since at least Roman times, and today carries road, motorway (A61), rail and canal links. Castelnaudary is the main port of the Canal du Midi to which it owed a period of prosperity in the 17th century when agricultural and manufactured produce became easier to export. The Grand Bassin in the town is at 7 ha (17 acres) the largest open area of water in the canal, and is today its major pleasure port. Castelnaudary station has rail connections to Toulouse, Carcassonne and Narbonne.

== History ==
=== Roman staging post ===
In Roman times the location of the town was a staging post on the Narbonne-Toulouse road, and called Sostomagus.

=== Origin of the name ===
Castelnaudary comes from the Occitan Castèlnòu d'Arri – Latin translation Castellum Novum Arri – meaning "Arrius' new castle".

=== Major events ===
- 1103. First official mention of a settlement at Castelnaudary.
- 1211. During the Albigensian Crusade, Simon de Montfort, 5th Earl of Leicester is besieged in Castelnaudary by the Count of Toulouse and the Count of Foix.
- 1235. Arrival of the Papal inquisition whose initial attempts to identify and persecute Cathars were unsuccessful due to the solidarity of the townsfolk.
- 31 October 1355. During the Hundred Years' War, the town is sacked by the Black Prince who travelling from Bordeaux, ravaged the weaker towns of Gascony and then the Lauragais as far as Narbonne. The town was pillaged and the inhabitants massacred. The town's walls were not rebuilt until 10 years later.
- 1477. The town becomes the capital of the comté of Lauragais under Louis XI of France.
- 1632. The capture of Henri II de Montmorency just outside the town leads to his execution at Toulouse on the orders of Cardinal Richelieu.
- 15 May 1681. Commissioning of the Canal du Midi.
- 1754. Construction of L'Ile de la Cybèle.
- 1814. Marshal Soult withdraws to the town after the Battle of Toulouse before signing a final surrender at Naurouze.

== Population ==
Its inhabitants are called Chauriens.

Historical population

Year	Pop.	±% p.a.
1793	7,871	—
1800	7,610	−0.48%
1806	7,924	+0.68%
1821	9,493	+1.21%
1831	9,886	+0.41%
1836	10,186	+0.60%
1841	9,993	−0.38%
1846	9,635	−0.73%
1851	9,992	+0.73%
1856	9,652	−0.69%
1861	9,584	−0.14%
1866	9,075	−1.09%
1872	9,328	+0.46%
1876	9,042	−0.78%
1881	10,059	+2.15%
1886	10,105	+0.09%
1891	10,059	−0.09%
1896	9,720	−0.68%
1901	9,397	−0.67%

Year	Pop.	±% p.a.
1906	9,362	−0.07%
1911	9,542	+0.38%
1921	7,921	−1.84%
1926	7,891	−0.08%
1931	8,054	+0.41%
1936	8,246	+0.47%
1946	8,073	−0.21%
1954	8,765	+1.03%
1962	9,343	+0.80%
1968	9,936	+1.03%
1975	10,118	+0.26%
1982	10,750	+0.87%
1990	10,970	+0.25%
1999	10,851	−0.12%
2007	11,308	+0.52%
2012	11,748	+0.77%
2017	11,598	−0.26%
2023	12,151	+0.78%

Source: EHESS and INSEE (1968-2023)

== Sights ==
- L'Apothicairerie de l'Hôpital
- La Collégiale Saint-Michel
- Les Ecluses Saint-Roch
- Le Grand Bassin
- La Halle aux Grains
- L'Ile de la Cybèle.
- Le Moulin de Cugarel
- La Légion étrangère
- Le Présidial
- La Chapelle Notre-Dame de Pitié
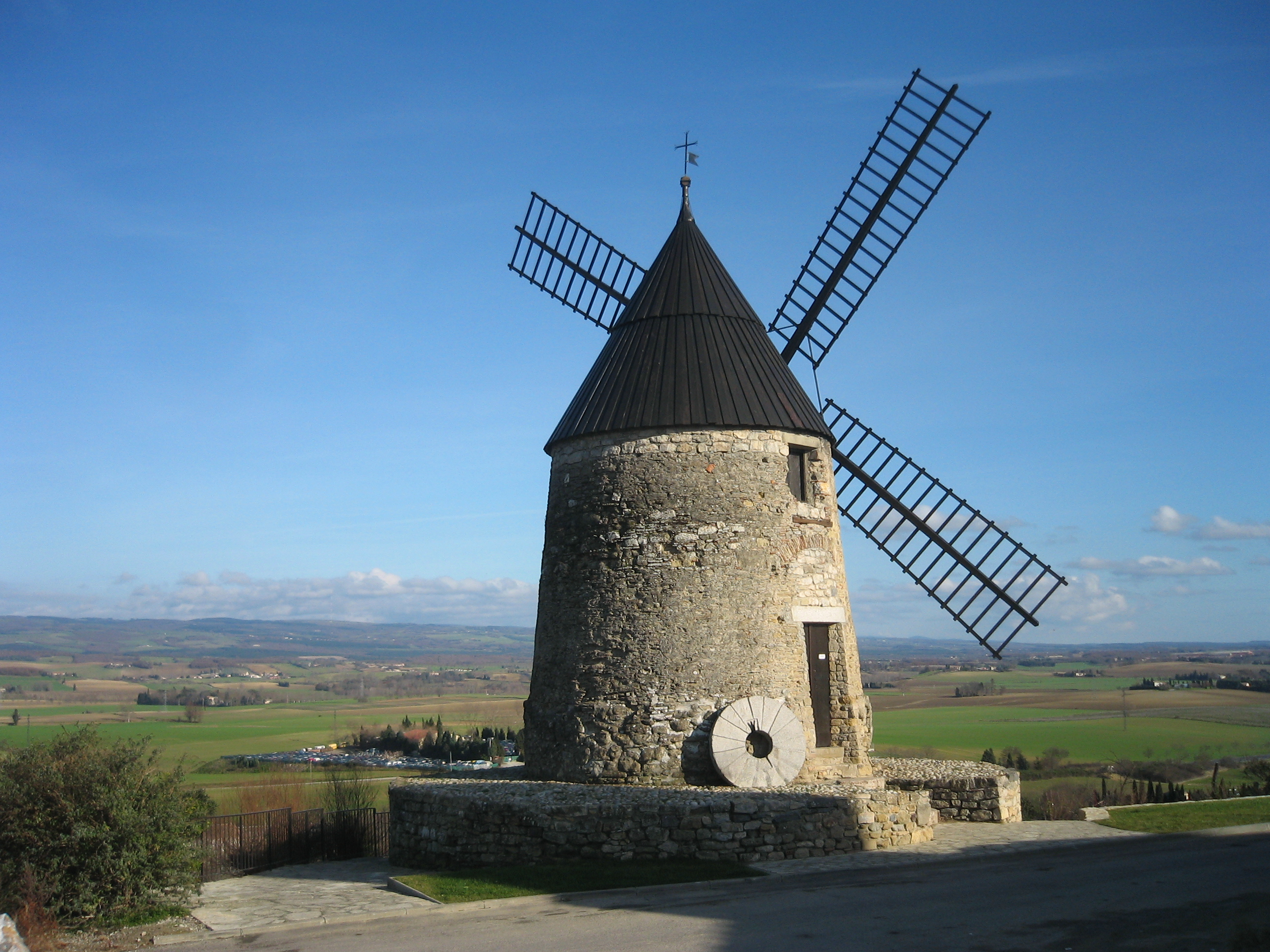
Moulin de Cugarel

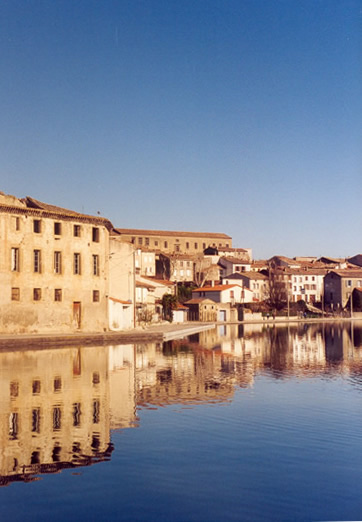
Canal du Midi in Castelnaudary

== Personalities ==
Castelnaudary was the birthplace of:

- Pierre de Castelnau d. 1208
- Pierre-Jean Fabre (1588–1658), physician to King Louis XIII
- Philippe de Rigaud Vaudreuil (1643–1725)
- Joseph Martin-Dauch (1741–1801), the only deputy from the Estates General of the Third Estate known to have signed as 'opposant' from taking the Tennis Court Oath, a major event of the French Revolution of 1789
- Jean François Aimé Dejean (1749–1824), army officer and minister of state in the service of the French First Republic and the First French Empire
- Antoine-François Andréossy (1761–1828)
- Antoine Marfan (1858–1942), pediatrician
- Georges Canguilhem (1904–1995), philosopher and member of the Académie Française who specialized in the philosophy of science

== Education ==
- École nationale de l'aviation civile

== Military base ==
The 4th Foreign Regiment of the French Army has been stationed in Castelnaudary since 1976, and the base is open to the public on 30 April (Camerone Day) and at Christmas.

== Cassoulet ==
Castelnaudary styles itself Capitale Mondiale du Cassoulet ("World Capital of Cassoulet") and the apocryphal legend of the genesis of this dish (originally called estofat) relates that it was first served to the defenders of the town during the siege of 1355.

The town is home to La Grande Confrérie du Cassoulet de Castelnaudary (The Brotherhood of Castelnaudary's Cassoulet), an organization which seeks to promote and preserve the dish and its associated traditions. An annual festival celebrating cassoulet, "fête du Cassoulet", is held in the last full week of August; the town center is crowded with various versions of the traditional dish on that date.

The cassoulet variant favored in this town is based on the local haricot bean (which is the subject of a protected status application). It also includes goose or duck confit, pork, and Toulouse sausage.

Traditional peasant versions of the recipe can take two days or more to prepare. The traditional cooking vessel is an eponymous earthenware pot called a "cassole."

Rick Stein featured the Castelnaudary cassoulet in an episode of Rick Stein's French Odyssey and his recipe was published by BBC Food.

== Climate ==
Climate data for Castelnaudary (1991–2020 normals, extremes 1951–present)
Month	Jan	Feb	Mar	Apr	May	Jun	Jul	Aug	Sep	Oct	Nov	Dec	Year
Record high °C (°F)	20.0 (68.0)	23.9 (75.0)	27.7 (81.9)	30.5 (86.9)	34.0 (93.2)	39.9 (103.8)	40.3 (104.5)	42.7 (108.9)	35.6 (96.1)	32.8 (91.0)	25.4 (77.7)	22.8 (73.0)	42.7 (108.9)
Mean daily maximum °C (°F)	9.6 (49.3)	11.0 (51.8)	14.7 (58.5)	17.5 (63.5)	21.1 (70.0)	25.7 (78.3)	28.4 (83.1)	28.6 (83.5)	24.6 (76.3)	19.6 (67.3)	13.4 (56.1)	10.3 (50.5)	18.7 (65.7)
Daily mean °C (°F)	6.4 (43.5)	7.1 (44.8)	10.1 (50.2)	12.5 (54.5)	16.2 (61.2)	20.2 (68.4)	22.5 (72.5)	22.7 (72.9)	19.2 (66.6)	15.4 (59.7)	10.0 (50.0)	7.2 (45.0)	14.1 (57.4)
Mean daily minimum °C (°F)	3.3 (37.9)	3.3 (37.9)	5.4 (41.7)	7.6 (45.7)	11.2 (52.2)	14.8 (58.6)	16.7 (62.1)	16.8 (62.2)	13.8 (56.8)	11.1 (52.0)	6.6 (43.9)	4.0 (39.2)	9.6 (49.3)
Record low °C (°F)	−15.6 (3.9)	−16.4 (2.5)	−9.4 (15.1)	−4.0 (24.8)	−1.0 (30.2)	4.6 (40.3)	7.0 (44.6)	6.0 (42.8)	2.8 (37.0)	−2.2 (28.0)	−7.6 (18.3)	−12.0 (10.4)	−16.4 (2.5)
Average precipitation mm (inches)	66.6 (2.62)	47.3 (1.86)	54.6 (2.15)	77.5 (3.05)	78.4 (3.09)	61.0 (2.40)	37.9 (1.49)	47.9 (1.89)	51.2 (2.02)	59.9 (2.36)	67.2 (2.65)	57.9 (2.28)	707.4 (27.85)
Average precipitation days (≥ 1.0 mm)	10.1	8.6	8.6	9.7	8.9	6.9	5.7	5.4	6.6	7.9	9.9	9.1	97.5
Source: Meteociel
