= Hugh de Vivonne =

French knight (died 1249)

Hugh's coat of arms: D'hermines, au chef de gueules (Ermine, a chief gules).

Hugh de Vivonne (Note: Also Hugues de Vivonne, Hugh of Vivonne, Hugh de Vivona or Hugh de Vivonia.) (died 1249) was a French knight from Vivonne in the County of Poitou. (Note: Poitou, along with Gascony, formed part of the Duchy of Aquitaine. There was a linguistic boundary between the two areas lying along the river Charente. To the north the Poitevin dialect of French was spoken and to the south the Gascon (Occitan) language was dominant. Hugh was a Poitevin with unusually extensive Gascon contacts.) He was loyal to the Plantagenet family and supported their right to vast lands in France. From 1215 onward he made his home in England, where he was constable of Bristol Castle (1216–21, 1236–41) and later High Sheriff of Somerset and Dorset (1241–49). He married an English lady and became lord of Chewton and Curry Mallet. He received further English estates in compensation for the loss of his lands in France. Yet, as a foreign soldier in the king's pay, he has been described as merely a "Poitevin mercenary captain".

He returned several times to France on behalf of King Henry III of England. In 1221 he served his first term as Seneschal of Gascony. In 1230 he went on a special mission in connection with Henry III's first invasion of France. He served a second term as seneschal in 1231–34. Finally, he took part in Henry III's second invasion of France in 1242–43.

== Constable of Bristol ==
Hugh probably arrived in England in 1215 as one of the soldiers in the company of the Poitevin Savaric de Mauléon coming to the aid of King John of England during the First Barons' War. Savaric was given command of Bristol Castle on the border between Gloucestershire and Somerset in the Welsh Marches. He left Hugh in charge of it when he went to attend the king on his deathbed. John died on 19 October 1216. Savaric was back at Bristol on 11 November, when a meeting of the leading men of the realm met there at the summons of the papal legate Guala Bicchieri. At this meeting, Savaric requested and received permission from the new regent to return to Poitou. When Savaric left England shortly thereafter, Hugh was left as constable (castellan) of Bristol. The first formal notice of Hugh as acting constable of Bristol is dated 7 April 1217.

In 1217 the regent of England, William Marshal, granted the Barton, a collection of royal properties attached to Bristol Castle for the upkeep of its garrison, (Note: The Barton included the King's Barton near Gloucester with the "wood of Furches" (Gallows Wood) and the chase (hunting ground) of Keynsham. The Barton had been acquired in 1189 by the future King John as part of the dowry of his wife, Isabella, heiress of Gloucester. At her death in 1217, Gilbert, the son of her sister Amice, was her heir.) to Gilbert de Clare as an appurtenance to his earldom of Gloucester. This was an act of patronage, generally acceptable and expected according to the norms of the time, for Gilbert had just married the regent's daughter, Isabel Marshal. He was also, however, a former rebel, who had fought against the king in the Barons' War, supported the rival kingship of Louis the Lion and stood as surety for Magna Carta. The regent's largesse thus came at the expense of one of John's loyal followers, Hugh, whose castellany depended on the Barton.

Hugh was ordered to hand over the Barton to the earl on 17 November 1217, but he refused unless he was compensated with other properties with which to finance Bristol Castle. He was promised 100 marks and 100 pounds in rents from other properties, but had not received them when he again refused an order to hand over the Barton even after the regent's grant had been confirmed by a Great Council on 6 May 1218.

He refused a third order in January 1219 and on 7 March 1219 he was warned by Peter des Roches, bishop of Winchester, that unless he complied all his lands would be forfeited to the Crown. He refused a fourth time, resolutely declaring that he would never hand over the Barton unless a different provision was made to sustain Bristol. He still had not received the promised rents. Regarding the threatened seizure of his lands, Hugh responded to King Henry III as a wounded loyal servant: "You can easily do that, but I certainly do not think I deserve it. For my family and I, in the service of King John ... and yourself [Henry III], have lost across the seas more fruitful and richer lands than I will ever have in England, and I have faithfully served King John ... while he lived, and you after his death, and still I serve you and will all the days of my life, so long as it pleases you."

When the Great Council met at Gloucester in June 1219 it confirmed Hugh's possession of the Barton and compensated the earl elsewhere. Hugh having reminded the council that he was technically only holding Bristol on behalf of Savaric, the council obtained from the latter a letter ordering Hugh to hand it over to the king. On 19 September 1219, Hugh handed the castle over to the king and received it back, to hold it at the king's pleasure. This was a special arrangement due to last only until August 1220. Peter des Roches had been consulted. In February 1220 Hugh was again ordered to hand over the Barton to the earl. Again he refused and ultimately the agreement was renewed until November 1222. A successor was appointed on 6 January 1221, when Hugh was preparing to leave England for Gascony. He was informed of his permanent successor, Pandulf Verraccio, on 28 January.

As constable of Bristol, Hugh had never rendered an account to the Exchequer, but subsequent renders show him to have been correct about the military necessity of the Barton for sustaining the castle. Almost all the revenues of the Barton went to the upkeep of Bristol Castle.

Hugh was re-appointed constable of Bristol on 17 August 1236 and given control of the Barton on 28 December 1236. He can be traced as constable in the fiscal years 1236–37, 1237–38 and 1238–39, beginning and ending on Michaelmas. His successor was acting constable by 1241.

== Seneschal of Poitou and Gascony ==
=== First term ===
Hugh left Bristol when he was appointed seneschal of Poitou and Gascony on 4 January 1221. (Note: That is when the letters patent appointing him are dated, but another letter in the Patent Roll describes him as seneschal on 25 December 1220.) He was appointed after the previous appointee, Philip of Oldcoates, died suddenly before he could take up the post. He was commissioned to recover the king's rights and his term was expected to last three years, although Hugh himself suspected that "misfortune" would end it sooner. Before going he extracted a promise from the regency that if he were removed from the seneschalcy before his term was up, he would be restored to Bristol Castle, since the agreement of August 1220 had not yet expired. Among the sureties of this arrangement were Geoffrey de Neville, a former seneschal of Gascony, and the Chief Justiciar Hubert de Burgh.

Hugh passed the summer of 1221 disputing with Hugh X of Lusignan, Count of La Marche, over the maritagium (dowry) of King John's widow, Isabella of Angoulême, who had married Hugh after John's death. In October Hugh was replaced as seneschal by his former employer, Savaric de Mauléon. By that time the dispute with the count had become open warfare, with the count besieging the castle of Merpins, defended by Renaud de Pons, a former seneschal and like Savaric a troubadour. (Note: Renaud had been ordered to turn the castle over to Isabelle in 1217, but had refused. In the circumstances of 1221, however, his rebelliousness had been transformed into loyalism and he was again regarded as holding the castle for the king.) As of 1 November, Hugh was still acting seneschal awaiting the arrival of Savaric.

The end of his term as seneschal did not end Hugh's involvement with Gascony. In the summer of 1224, King Louis VIII of France invaded Aquitaine with the support of the Count of La Marche. Marching through Poitou, where he took several towns, he laid siege to La Rochelle in Gascony. Savaric de Mauléon led the defence of the town, but on 3 August he surrendered it to Louis. The French king then returned to Paris by way of Poitou, leaving the count and the Poitevin seneschal he had appointed, Geoffroy de Builli, to mop up in Gascony. Henry III sent Hugh de Vivonne to Gascony to rescue the situation. On 21 September 1224 he reported to the king that, because the French did not garrison any of the towns that surrendered to them, "I count it for nothing and think that you will recover all that [Hugh de Lusignan and Geoffroy de Builli] have acquired in these parts if you send speedy aid and succour." In the face of strong resistance from Bordeaux and Bayonne, the Count of La Marche abandoned Gascony in October.

In early 1230 Hugh was dispatched by Henry III on a secret mission to the Count of La Marche. His objective was to recruit the count for Henry's coming invasion of France. He evidently failed, because when Henry III landed in Brittany in May 1230, the count did not come to meet him. Nor did he join him when the king campaigned in Poitou.

=== Second term ===
Hugh was appointed to a second term as seneschal of Gascony on 30 September 1231. He succeeded Richard de Burgh, who was appointed to take the place of Henry de Trubleville on 1 July but never took up the office. He became the first seneschal of Gascony required to swear an oath, (Note: In Studd's words: "to defend the king's interests throughout Poitou, Aquitaine and Gascony, to guard the king's rights and to seek to recover those which had been lost, and to use the revenues generated from those lands to the best advantage of the king.") which afterwards became the norm.

The replacement of Trubleville as seneschal seems to have been sparked by concerns over his integrity. (Note: The replacement of Trubleville may also have had something to do with the rivalry between Bordeaux's two leading families, the Coloms and Solers. The Colom party was opposed to Trubleville, but although Hugh's tenure as seneschal coincides with the election of a Colom mayor, Frank Marsh sees no reason to think of Hugh as attached to or under the influence of one party or another.) On 16 October the Crown instructed Hugh that he should revoke all of Trubleville's alienations of crown land. Henry III also wrote the mayor, council and jurats of Bordeaux instructing them to turn over any revenues granted them by Trubleville without royal approval to Hugh. Revoking his predecessor's acts did not make Hugh popular. He removed Richard de Poncellis from his post of bailiff, but Richard refused to return some armour and other things that he held on behalf of the Crown. Only a royal letter of 27 January 1233 induced him to surrender. Randolf de Talemunt, who likewise refused to hand over some arms and armor from the castle of Oléron, only surrendered when Hugh procured a royal letter. In many cases, the constables appointed by Trubleville refused to surrender their castles to him, claiming they were owed wages. In some instances they even offered armed resistance. it was not until August 1233 that he took control of castle of Roquefort (now Sorèze) from its garrison.

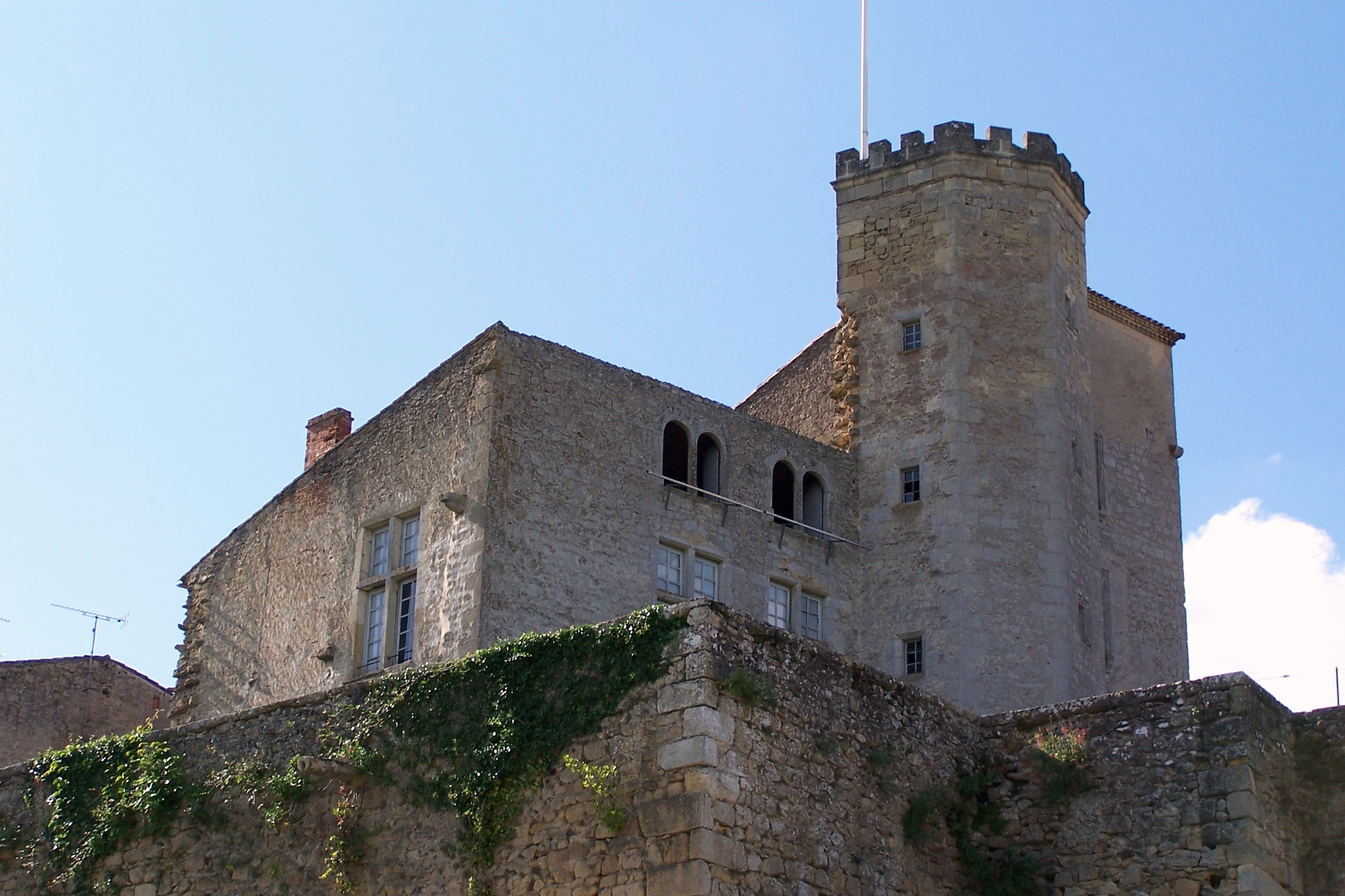
The royal castle of Saint-Macaire, which the city of Bordeaux was ordered several times to hand over to Hugh.

Hugh's second term ended when Hugh de Trubleville was reappointed to succeed him on 23 May 1234. Although out of office, Hugh does not appear to have left Gascony immediately. He was still there in October 1235 and February 1236 trying to get hold of the castle of Saint-Macaire on the king's behalf.

When Henry III came to Aquitaine at the head of an army in 1242, he frequently bypassed his actual seneschal, deputing others to carry out his executive orders. One of those he entrusted with certain tasks was Hugh of Vivonne. Hugh was present with the king at the disastrous battle of Taillebourg (21–22 July 1242).

== Sheriff of Somerset and Dorset ==
Hugh was appointed High Sheriff of Somerset and Dorset in February 1241 and held the offices until his death. He was one of the last "curial" sheriffs who held his shrievalty on account of his connection to the royal court and relied on under-sheriffs for the day-to-day responsibilities of the job. Owing to his high position, Hugh governed Somerset and Dorset on more favourable terms than the merely local knights who held most shrievalties by the 1240s.

The terms of his appointment specified that he (and not the Exchequer) should receive all the revenues of the counties, which were classified as "farms", "increments" and "profits". The Exchequer appears to have initially resisted this, since it was only in October 1241 that it agreed that Hugh could keep the increment to finance the upkeep of Corfe Castle, although in its accounting it treated it as a subsidy returned to the sheriff from the Exchequer. In 1246, the Exchequer finally conceded that all the profit of the counties could go to Hugh, even while noting that Hugh did not know how much that was, an indication of his absentee sheriffship.

== Family and property ==
The names of Hugh's parents are unknown. He had a brother named Aimery, who was dead by 16 March 1247.

On 20 December 1215 Hugh was granted the estates confiscated from William Malet, a leading baron of Somerset and a Magna Carta surety. In 1219–20 Hugh tried to arrange the marriage of his nephew, Hugh de Chaceporc, (Note: A certain Eimeric de Chaceporc, presumably of the same family as Hugh's namesake nephew, was a member of Hugh's household in the 1230s.) with Alice Basset, daughter of Thomas Basset and widow of William Malet. Hugh's purpose in arranging the marriage was, according to a letter he wrote to the chief justiciar in January 1220, "so that I and mine can stay in England". By that time he had already received approval for the marriage from Peter des Roches and Pandulf Verraccio, papal legate to England. Despite support in high places, the marriage never took place and Hugh's endeavours mixed him up in the bitter rivalries of the West Country gentry.

Hugh himself later married William Malet's daughter, Mabel, a widow of Nicholas de Avenel. (Note: She was still married to Nicholas as late as 1221. She was married Hugh by 18 November 1223.) She seems to have died before 1248. Hugh and Mabel had three sons and two daughters:

- William le Fort (died 22 May 1259), recovered Hugh's Poitevin lands; married Matilda, daughter of William, Earl of Derby, and Sibyl, daughter of William Marshal; had issue
- Sibyl, married Anselm de Gourney
- Hugh (died September 1257/9), married Petronilla and had a son, John
- Savaric (died after 29 April 1264), acquired the lordship of Bougon and paid homage to Alphonse, Count of Poitou in 1260
- Helewisa (c. 1247 – after 1270), who married Sir Walter de Wahull (Walter III), feudal baron of Odell Castle

Through his wife Hugh acquired the manors of Chewton and Curry Mallet in Somerset. He and Robert de Mucegros, husband of Mabel's sister Helewise, also acquired their father-in-law's extensive debts. A debt to the Exchequer of 2,000 marks was slowly paid off by Hugh's unrecompensed service in Gascony. In 1246 Hugh acquired by royal grant the manor of Corton Denham, which had belonged to the Saint-Hilaire family. Hugh in turn gave it to his daughter Sibyl and her husband.

Hugh died in 1249, sometime before 16 October.

== Sources ==
- Carpenter, David A. (1976). "The Decline of the Curial Sheriff in England, 1194–1258". The English Historical Review. 91 (358): 1–32. doi:10.1093/ehr/xci.ccclviii.1.
- Carpenter, David A. (1990). The Minority of Henry III. University of California Press.
- Chaytor, Henry J. (1939). Savaric de Mauléon: Baron and Troubadour. Cambridge University Press.
- Choffel, Jacques (1983). Louis VIII le lion: Roi de France méconnu, roi d'Angleterre ignoré. Fernand Lanore.
- Eales, Richard G. (1988). "Castles and Politics in England, 1215–1224". Thirteenth Century England. 2: 23–43.
- Finberg, H. P. R. (1957). "A Disobedient Loyalist". Gloucestershire Studies. Leicester University Press. pp. 116–19.
- Marsh, Frank Burr (1912). English Rule in Gascony, 1199–1295, with Special References to the Towns. University of Michigan historical studies ...[II]. G. Wahr.
- Norgate, Kate (1912). The Minority of Henry the Third. Macmillan.
- Ridgeway, Huw (2013). "Dorset in the Period of Baronial Reform and Rebellion, 1258–67". Historical Research. 87 (235): 18–42. doi:10.1111/1468-2281.12044.
- Sainte-Marie, Anselme de; Fourny, H. C. du; Sainte-Rosalie, Ange de; Lucas, Simplicien (1733). Histoire généalogique et chronologique de la maison royale de France, des pairs, grands officiers de la Couronne, de la Maison du Roy et des anciens barons du royaume. Vol. 8. La compagnie des Librairies Associez.
- Schooling, Margaret (2012). "13th-century Marriages between the Anglo-Norman and Poitou Families of Vivonne, Ferrers and Rochechouart" (PDF). Foundations. 4: 21–35.
- Sharp, Margaret, ed. (1982). Accounts of the Constables of Bristol Castle in the Thirteenth and Early Fourteenth Centuries. Bristol Record Society.
- Shirley, W. W. (1866). Royal and Other Historical Letters Illustrative of the Reign of Henry III. Vol. 2: 1236–1272. Longmans, Green, Reader, and Dyer.
- Stacey, Robert C. (1987). Politics, Policy, and Finance under Henry III, 1216–1245. Clarendon Press.
- Studd, Robin (2002). "Reconfiguring the Angevin Empire, 1224–1259". In Ifor W. Rowlands; Björn K. U. Weiler (eds.). England and Europe in the Reign of Henry III (1216–1272). Routledge. pp. 31–41.
- Vincent, Nicholas (1996). Peter des Roches: An Alien in English Politics, 1205–1238. Cambridge University Press. ISBN 978-0-521-55254-7.
- Young, Charles Robert (1996). The Making of the Neville Family in England, 1166–1400. The Boydell Press.
