= Winterbourne Bassett =

Village in Wiltshire, England

Coordinates: 51.473°N 1.854°W

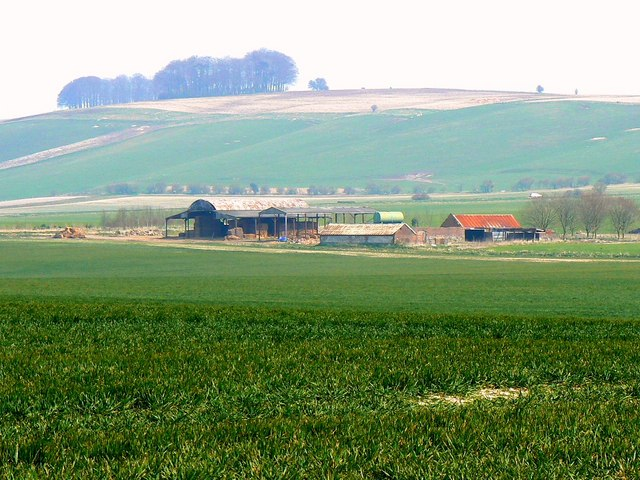
- Farmland near Hackpen White Horse

- Location within Wiltshire
- Population: 159 (in 2011)
- OS grid reference: SU102749
- Civil parish: Winterbourne Bassett
- Unitary authority: Wiltshire Council
- Ceremonial county: Wiltshire
- Region: South West
- Country: England
- Sovereign state: United Kingdom
- Post town: Swindon
- Postcode district: SN4
- Dialling code: 01793
- Police: Wiltshire
- Fire: Dorset and Wiltshire
- Ambulance: South Western
- UK Parliament: Chippenham
- Website: Parish Council

Winterbourne Bassett is a small village and civil parish in Wiltshire, England, about 6 miles (10 km) southwest of Swindon and 7 miles (11 km) northwest of Marlborough.

The village lies just west of the A4361 road between Swindon and Devizes, about 3 miles (5 km) north of Avebury. The minor road through the village continues west to Clyffe Pypard. The parish shares a grouped parish council with the neighbouring parish of Broad Hinton.

== History ==
The remains of a Late Neolithic or Early Bronze Age stone circle lie largely hidden on a low ridge, about 1 kilometre (0.6 mi) northwest of the village. The ancient trackway known as The Ridgeway crosses the east of the parish.

In 1086, Domesday Book recorded 37 households at Wintreburne, and land held by Amesbury Abbey. The name Winterbourne refers to seasonal streams in the area, which meet to form the upper waters of the River Kennet. The Bassett suffix is from lords of the manor in the 12th and 13th centuries, and distinguishes the parish and village from Winterbourne Monkton, close by to the south.

Winterbourne manor was granted in 1194 to Alan Basset (d.1232/3), whose name appears in Magna Carta as an advisor to the king. The manor was inherited in turn by his sons Gilbert (d.1241), Fulk (later bishop of London, d.1259) and Philip (Justiciar of England, d.1271). Philip's daughter Aline married Hugh le Despencer, 1st Baron le Despencer (d.1265) and thus the manor was inherited by her son Hugh Despenser the Elder (advisor to Edward I, executed 1326). The manor reverted to the Crown; the Wiltshire Victoria County History traces its later ownership. The present manor house, just north of the church, was built in brick in the late 18th century.

There were further settlements at Rabson (southeast of Winterbourne Bassett) and Richardson (southwest). Rabson probably dwindled to a single farmstead by the 16th century; the house known as Rabson Manor, 400m south of the church and now surrounded by farm buildings, dates from the early 17th century.

Richardson (Ricardestone in 1242) was further south. The site of the deserted village – a scheduled monument – survives as building platforms, enclosures and tracks, one leading to a ford across the river. A country house here was demolished in the 19th century.

== Governance ==
There are two tiers of local government covering Winterbourne Bassett, at parish and unitary authority level: Broad Hinton and Winterbourne Bassett Parish Council and Wiltshire Council. The parish council is a grouped parish council, covering the two parishes of Winterbourne Bassett and Broad Hinton.

== Parish church ==
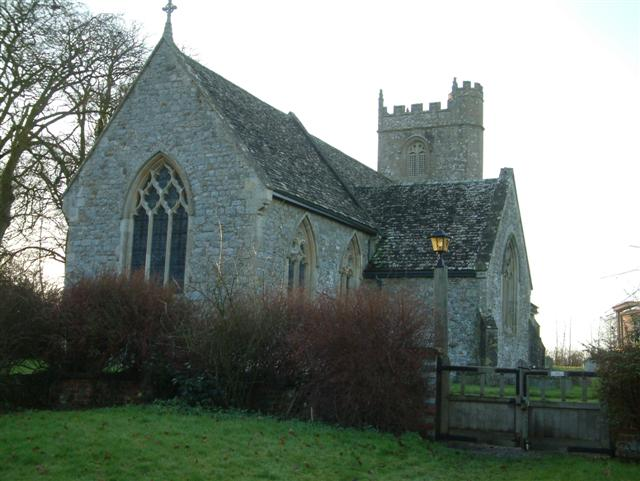
Parish church

There was a church by 1121, linked to Lewes Priory. Fulk Basset was rector from c.1214 to c.1239. The church was dedicated to St Catherine in the 16th century but was known as St Peter's in 1848; since 1904 the dedication has been to St Katherine and St Peter. The present parish church is a rebuilding from the 14th century; its only earlier features are the font – 12th century or early 13th – and a limestone grave slab of the late 13th century.

The nave and chancel are in random sarsen while the 15th-century four-stage west tower is in limestone ashlar. Many of the furnishings, including the oak pulpit and reader's desk, are 17th-century. Renovation in 1857-8 saw replacement of the roofs, but the rest of the structure and most of the windows were retained; the northwest window of the chancel has fragments of 14th or 15th-century glass. There are three bells, one cast in 1583 and the others in the 19th century. The church was designated as Grade I listed in 1958.

Pevsner writes that the church has "excellent Decorated work". He notes that the Despensers were lords of the manor at the time, and that the north transept with its "unusually dainty detail" may have been their chapel.

The benefice was united with Berwick Bassett in 1929, although the parishes remained separate; the incumbent was to live at the Winterbourne Bassett parsonage. The union was dissolved in 1951 and the benefice was held in plurality with Broad Hinton. In 1975 a team ministry was created for the area, and today the parish is part of the Upper Kennet Benefice, alongside seven others around Avebury.

== Amenities ==
There was a small school in the village from 1875 to 1966; primary school children now go to Broad Hinton. A Methodist chapel was built in 1904 and sold in 1960.

The village has a public house and restaurant called The Winterbourne, owned by a community benefit society.

== Sources ==
- "Winterbourne Bassett". Wiltshire Community History. Wiltshire Council.
