= Thomas Basset =

Thomas Basset may refer to:

- Thomas Basset (judge), died c. 1182, English judge
- Thomas Basset (died 1220), English royal counsellor, son of the judge

== See also ==
- Thomas Bassett Macaulay (1860–1942), Canadian actuary and philanthropist
