= St Nicholas's Church, Berwick Bassett =

St Nicholas's Church
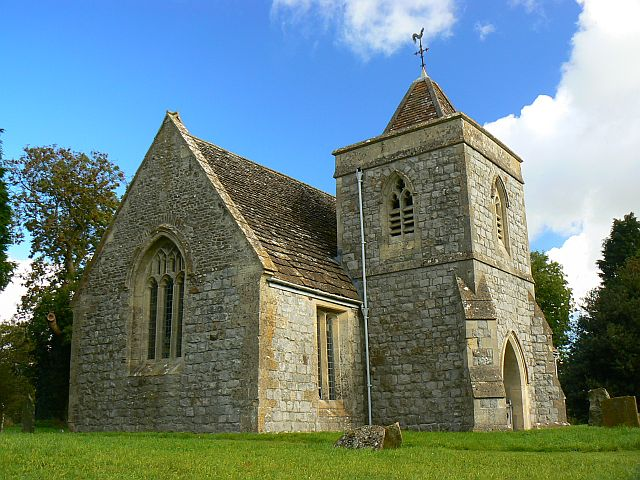

- Location within Wiltshire
- 51°27′39″N 1°51′35″W
- Location: Berwick Bassett, Wiltshire England

History
- Built: 15th century

Listed Building – Grade II*
- Designated: 27 February 1958
- Reference no.: 1365565

St Nicholas's Church in Berwick Bassett, Wiltshire, England dates from the early 13th century. It is recorded in the National Heritage List for England as a Grade II* listed building, and is now a redundant church in the care of the Churches Conservation Trust. It was declared redundant in 1972, and was vested in the Trust the next year. Services continue to be held at the church a few times a year.

The church can only be approached by a pedestrian footpath. The redbrick chancel was built between 1199 and 1221, with the nave being added in the 14th century and built of sarsen stone. On the south wall is a scratch dial. The interior has a font from the 13th century and a rood screen from the 15th. The pulpit, altar rail and pews are from the 19th century. There is a trefoiled piscina, a shallow basin used for washing the communion vessels. Monuments include wall tablets to Henry Webb (died 1776), John Nalder (1794), and Elizabeth Nalder (1835).

In the 1660s the church was visited by John Aubrey, who described the memorials and tombs he saw. In 1857 the church underwent a major restoration by Thomas Henry Wyatt. This included replacement of the original wooden tower with the current stone structure which contains three bells dating from the 17th century. At this point the walls were rendered and whitewashed.

== Parish ==
The benefice was united with that of Winterbourne Monkton in 1865. In 1929 the union was severed, and Berwick was instead united with Winterbourne Bassett. In 1952 the union was again dissolved, in order that the incumbent of the united benefice of Avebury with Winterbourne Monkton could also hold Berwick. Those benefices were united in 1970, and their three parishes united at the same time; in 1975 a team ministry was created for the area, which became known as the Upper Kennet benefice.

== See also ==
- List of churches preserved by the Churches Conservation Trust in Southwest England
