= Adeliza Basset =

English noblewoman

Adeliza Basset (née de Dunstanville, died in or after 1210) was an English noblewoman.

== Biography ==
Basset was the daughter of Alan de Dunstanville. She married Thomas Basset of Hedendon in about 1210.

Their children were:

- Gilbert Basset
- Thomas Basset and Alan Basset
- Alice Basset who married William Malet
- Isabel Basset who married Guy de Craon
