= Philippa Basset =

- Countess of Warwick
- Coat of arms of Basset
- Died: c. October 1265; Headington, Oxfordshire
- Noble family: Basset of Headington
- Spouses: Henry (II) de Newburgh, earl of Warwick; Richard Siward
- Issue: Richard Siward, lord of Kellie
- Father: Thomas Basset of Headington (died 1220)
- Mother: Philippa Maubanc

Philippa Basset, Countess of Warwick (died c. October 1265), was a 13th-century noblewoman and heiress. She was the wife firstly of Henry (II) de Newburgh, earl of Warwick and after his premature death she was married to Richard Siward a soldier and adventurer at the court of King Henry III of England.

== Family and first marriage ==
Philippa was the eldest of three daughters of Thomas Basset of Headington (died c. April 1220) head of a branch of the prolific 12th-century Basset family, and a long-time royal courtier and sheriff of Oxford in the reign of King John. In 1204 Thomas was awarded the wardship of the under-age earl of Warwick, Henry, then only twelve or thirteen but already married to Margaret d'Oilly. His child wife became pregnant and died delivering twins in 1205, the elder, a boy, being named by the teenage earl Thomas, apparently after his guardian; there is good evidence of lifelong friendship between Basset and the young earl. Following this domestic tragedy Thomas Basset exercised his right as guardian and in June 1205 he married his eldest daughter Philippa to his ward. In 1220 Earl Henry acquired the manor of Headington on the death of his father-in-law by right of Philippa, whose share of his inheritance it was as the chief manor of his barony. The earl died however on 10 October 1229 still only around 37 but leaving his son Thomas as adult heir by his first wife. Philippa at this point assumed control not just of the lordship of Headington but substantial dower lands in the earldom of Warwick: the castle of Brailes, Warwickshire, the manor and forest of Sutton Coldfield, Chedworth, Gloucestershire and East Knoyle, Wiltshire.

== Widowhood and second marriage ==
Philippa's sizable dowry and inheritance made her vulnerable in her widowhood, as she must have realised. This would be why she put herself under the protection of her first cousin, Gilbert Basset, lord of High Wycombe and a prominent courtier, and allowed herself to be persuaded into a marriage with Basset's ally, the eminent soldier and political adventurer, Richard Siward. It happened at some time in 1230: she was still at liberty in January, but Siward had control of her estates by September. As a result of the marriage, Philippa was caught up in the subsequent rebellion of Basset and Siward against King Henry III which broke out in the summer of 1233. The king treated her with civility during the hostilities, Philippa had a protection for her dower lands in December 1233 and free passage for her and her household into the Marches to join her husband in January 1234. The result of the rebellion was favourable for Siward. His dashing exploits during the warfare made him something of a national hero and attracted the king's patronage. He became a banneret of the king's household and a member of the royal council. Though the marriage produced at least one child, and possibly more, it was not a success, and Philippa fell out with Richard. On the death of Gilbert Basset in 1241 and in the subsequent difficulties Siward experienced in his political life, Philippa petitioned for a divorce. She had secured this by the end of 1242 when a schedule was drawn up dividing their possessions. By the terms of the divorce Philippa reclaimed all her lands; custody of her son by Siward went to the father, but the boy was debarred from his mother's inheritance.

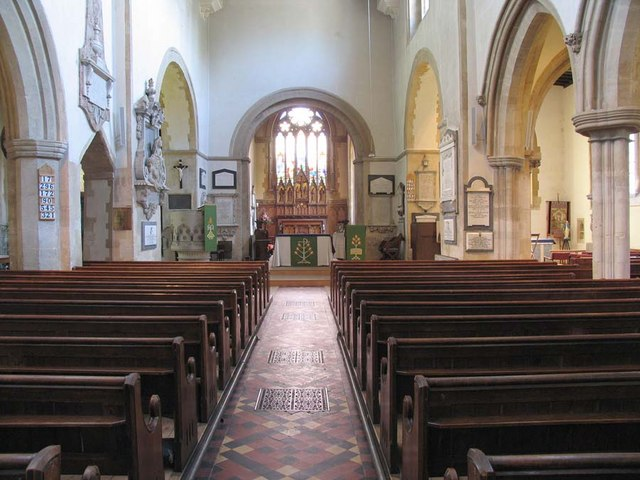
St Edburga's Priory, Bicester, where Countess Philippa was buried

== Later years and death ==
Philippa spent the rest of her life as the widowed countess of Warwick, preferring to ignore the episode of her marriage to Siward (who died in 1248). She resided at her manor of Headington outside Oxford and became a patron of the priory at Bicester, which had been founded by the Basset family at the end of the 12th century. Though her son Richard was brought up in the Scottish royal court after 1248 she had not forgotten him. In her latter years she endowed a light at an altar in Bicester priory for the souls of herself and, as the grant said, her children. This implies that she had more than one child by her second husband, though the others may not have survived to adulthood. Philippa Basset died in 1265, before November, when her heirs did homage to the king, and is said to have been buried in Bicester priory.

== Sources ==
- Cokayne, George E. (1945), The New Complete Peerage, vol. 12, St. Catherine Press Limited
- The Newburgh Earldom of Warwick and its Charters, 1088-1253 ed. David Crouch and Richard Dace (Dugdale Society, 48, 2015)
- Peter Coss, "Basset, Philippa, countess of Warwick", Oxford Dictionary of National Biography, 23 September 2004. Accessed 2 February 2021.
