= Bincknoll Castle =

Possible Iron Age hillfort in Wiltshire, England

- Bincknoll Camp
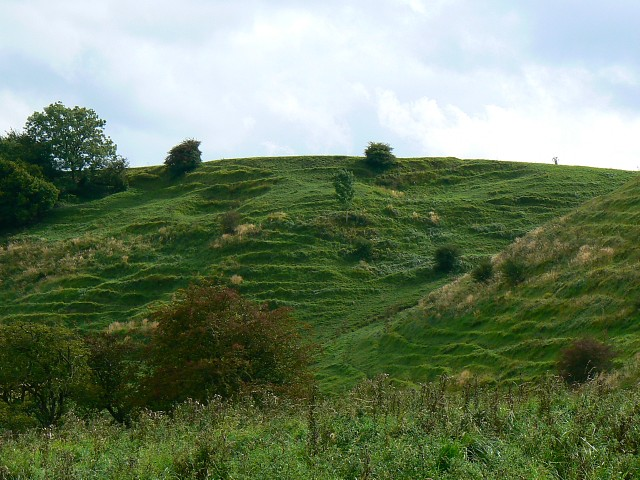
- Bincknoll Castle, Wiltshire

- Location within Wiltshire
- 51.5128°N 1.8467°W
- Periods: Bronze Age, Iron Age
- Location: Wiltshire

Site notes
- Area: 23.5 acres (9.5 ha)
- Condition: good
- Public access: yes

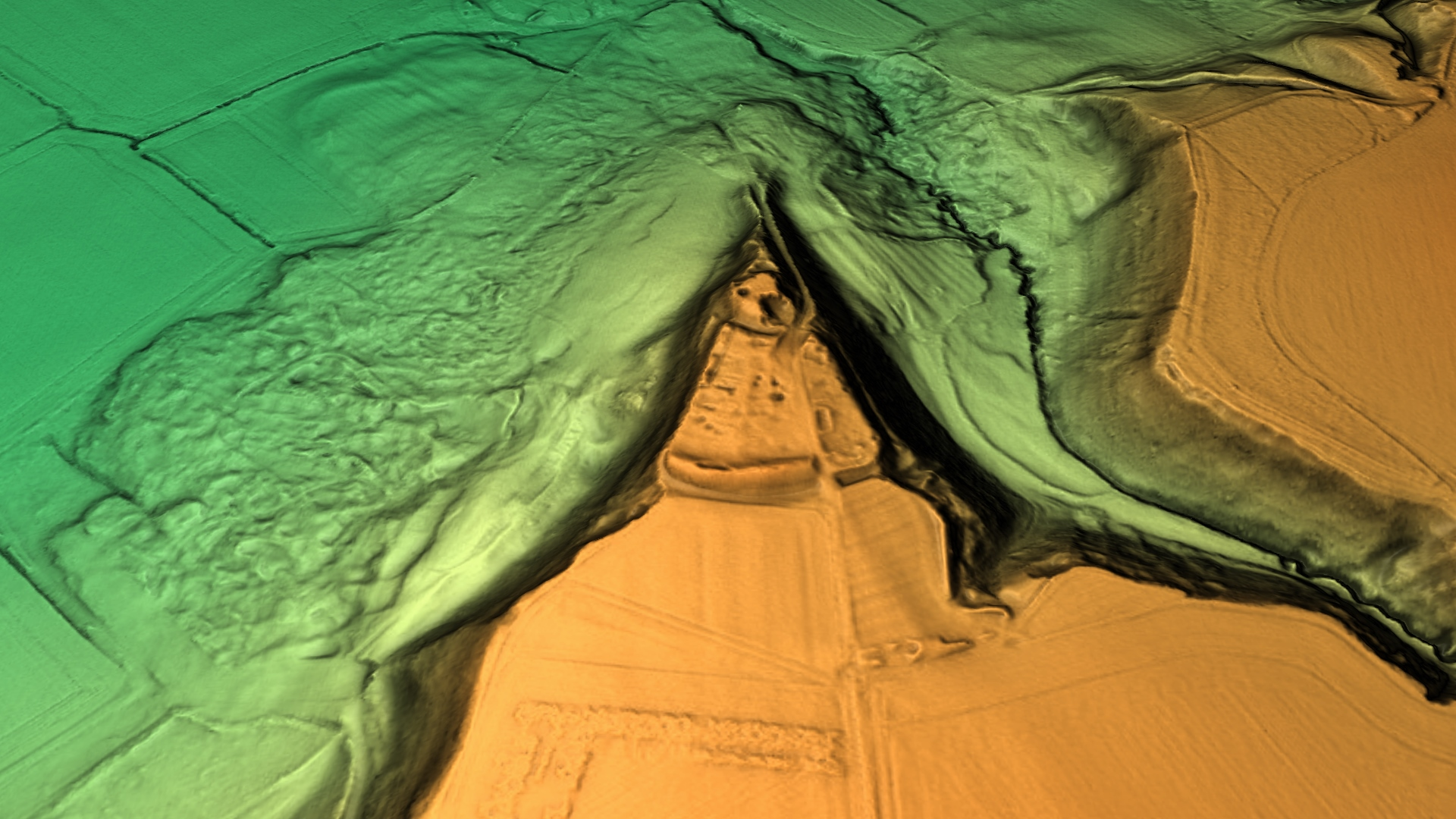
3D view of the digital terrain model

Bincknoll Castle, or Bincknoll Camp, is the site of a possible Iron Age univallate hillfort in Wiltshire, England.

The site lies on the end of a triangular promontory on the escarpment beneath the Ridgeway to the south. The steeply-contoured sides offer excellent natural defences, with only the level lands to the south offering easy access. The suggestion that the site originates in the Iron Age is currently unproven. Pottery found on site has been Roman or later in date. Geophysical fieldwork is planned in the near future, hopefully this will inform the debate about the castle's chronology. Pronounced 'Bynol' Castle, the current earthworks appear to demonstrate a Norman motte and bailey castle of considerable natural strength. It is likely that Gilbert of Breteuil, after the Norman Conquest, acquired a block of manors centred on Broad Hinton and built the castle to oversee them. The motte, now severely mutilated by later quarrying, measures approximately 52 metres in diameter by 3 metres high, and its ditch is 2.3 metres deep. The inner enclosure has a bank and ditch 3.4 metres high dividing it from the outer enclosure, with a causeway entrance. The earthworks of the now-deserted hamlet of Bincknoll, which grew up outside the castle, may be discerned in Bincknoll Dip, sloping away to the north.

The site is a scheduled monument.

== Location ==
The site is at grid reference SU107793, to the west of the village of Wroughton, and to the north of the village of Broad Hinton, in the county of Wiltshire. Barbury Castle hill fort is about 3.5 miles away to the south-east. The site has a summit of 195m AOD, and is accessible from public footpaths.

== See also ==
- List of hillforts in England
