= Dumfries Castle =

Coordinates: 55.0561°N 3.6022°W

Dumfries Castle was a royal castle that was located in Dumfries, Scotland. It was sited by the River Nith, in the area now known as Castledykes Park.

A motte and bailey castle was built in the 12th century. The town was created a royal burgh by King William the Lion in 1186. The castle was enlarged and rebuilt in stone in 1214. King Alexander III of Scotland visited the castle in 1264 to plan an expedition against the Isle of Man. Robert de Brus, 5th Lord of Annandale captured the castle in 1286. The castle was occupied by the English from 1298. King Edward I of England stayed at the castle in 1300. Robert de Brus captured the castle briefly in 1306 from the English-appointed constable Richard Siward. King Robert I of Scotland captured the castle on 7 February 1313 from the English appointed constable, his enemy Dungal Macdouall, who had turned King Robert's brothers, Thomas and Alexander, over to Edward I, who promptly executed them. According to the RCAHMS there is "a strong belief" that it was destroyed after the capture and never rebuilt.

== See also ==
- Troqueer Castle
- Kirkhill Castle
