= Winterbourne Monkton =

Village in Wiltshire, England

Coordinates: 51.447°N 1.857°W

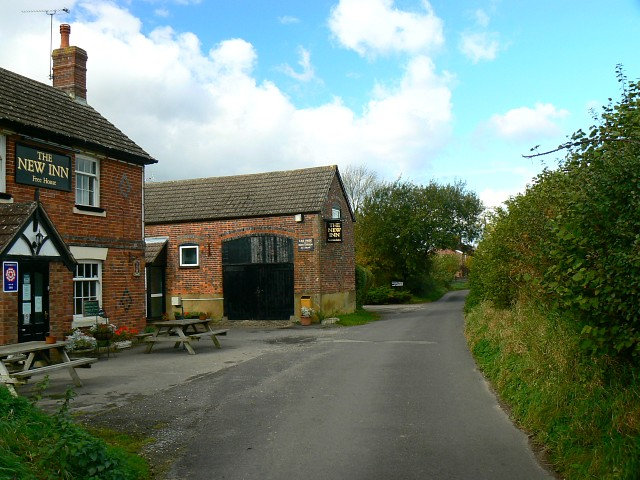
- The New Inn, Winterbourne Monkton

- Location within Wiltshire
- Population: 160 (in 2011)
- OS grid reference: SU100720
- Civil parish: Winterbourne Monkton
- Unitary authority: Wiltshire
- Ceremonial county: Wiltshire
- Region: South West
- Country: England
- Sovereign state: United Kingdom
- Post town: Swindon
- Postcode district: SN4
- Dialling code: 01672
- Police: Wiltshire
- Fire: Dorset and Wiltshire
- Ambulance: South Western
- UK Parliament: East Wiltshire
- Website: Parish Council

Winterbourne Monkton is a small village and civil parish in Wiltshire, England, about 1 mile (1.6 km) north of Avebury Stone Circle and 6 miles (10 km) northwest of Marlborough.

The village lies immediately west of the A4361 road between Swindon and Devizes.

== History ==
The large Neolithic causewayed enclosure on Windmill Hill, in the southeast towards Avebury, is partly in the parish. The eastern boundary of the parish is the ancient trackway known as The Ridgeway.

Domesday Book in 1086 recorded a settlement at Wintreborne with 32 households, and land held by Glastonbury Abbey.

The name Winterbourne (first evidenced in 869) refers to the Kennet, which at this point is seasonal. The Monkton suffix reflects the Glastonbury estate, to distinguish the parish and village from other Winterbournes in Wiltshire, including Winterbourne Bassett which is close by to the north.

After the dissolution of Glastonbury, the manor was granted to Edward Seymour, later Duke of Somerset, who soon sold it. Sir James Harvey, later Lord Mayor of London, bought the manor in 1577. In 1621 it was inherited through marriage by John Popham MP of Littlecote House, who was succeeded by his brother Alexander (died 1669, also an MP). The manor continued in the Popham family until c.1899, and was sold as four farms in 1917.

== Local government ==
Winterbourne Monkton elects a joint parish council with the adjacent parish of Berwick Bassett. It falls within the area of the Wiltshire Council, a unitary authority which is responsible for all significant local government functions.

== Parish church ==
The Church of England parish church of St Mary Magdalen is Grade II listed. The church has 12th-century origins but was rebuilt in 1878 by William Butterfield.

== Amenities ==
A National School was built in 1847 and educated children of all ages until 1949. It became a Church of England primary school which closed in 1971; local children go to Broad Hinton or Lockeridge.

The village pub, the New Inn, closed in 2012. In 2018, the pub reopened under the same name, and also has an attached B&B, named Elderbrook House.
