= Kirkcudbright Castle =

Castle in Dumfries and Galloway, Scotland

Coordinates: 54.8352°N 4.0611°W

Kirkcudbright Castle, was a castle that was located on the banks of the River Dee, in Kirkcudbright, Scotland.

A motte and bailey castle was built in the 12th century, however this was replaced with another castle in the 13th century to the south west. The castle belonged to the Comyn family but was placed in the care of King Edward I of England. Sir Walter de Corrie became the governor of the castle in 1291 and Richard Siward became the governor of the castle in 1292. King Edward I stayed at the castle in 1300. King Robert the Bruce captured the castle after 1313 and it appears to have been demolished.
