= Thomas Basset (judge) =

English judge (died c. 1182)

Thomas Basset (died c. 1182) was a 12th-century English judge.

== Life ==
Basset was the son of Gilbert Basset (presumably a son of Ralph Basset, the justiciar). He received a grant of the lordship of Hedendon, Oxfordshire, for services in war, and served as Sheriff of Oxfordshire from 1163 to 1164. In 1167–8 he was an itinerant justice for Essex and Hertfordshire, and in 1169 he became a baron of the exchequer, a post he held to c. 1181. In 1175 he was again an itinerant justice and in close attendance on the court, as he continued to be until 1181. Basset was specially named as a justice itinerant on one of the new circuits on 10 April 1179. He married Adelizade Dunstanville and their children were sons Gilbert, Thomas and Alan and daughters Alice who married William Malet and Isabel who married Guy de Craon. He is last mentioned in August 1181, and at the close of 1182 he had been succeeded by his son Gilbert.
