= Richard Siward (died 1311) =

13th-14th century Scottish noble

- Lord of Kellie
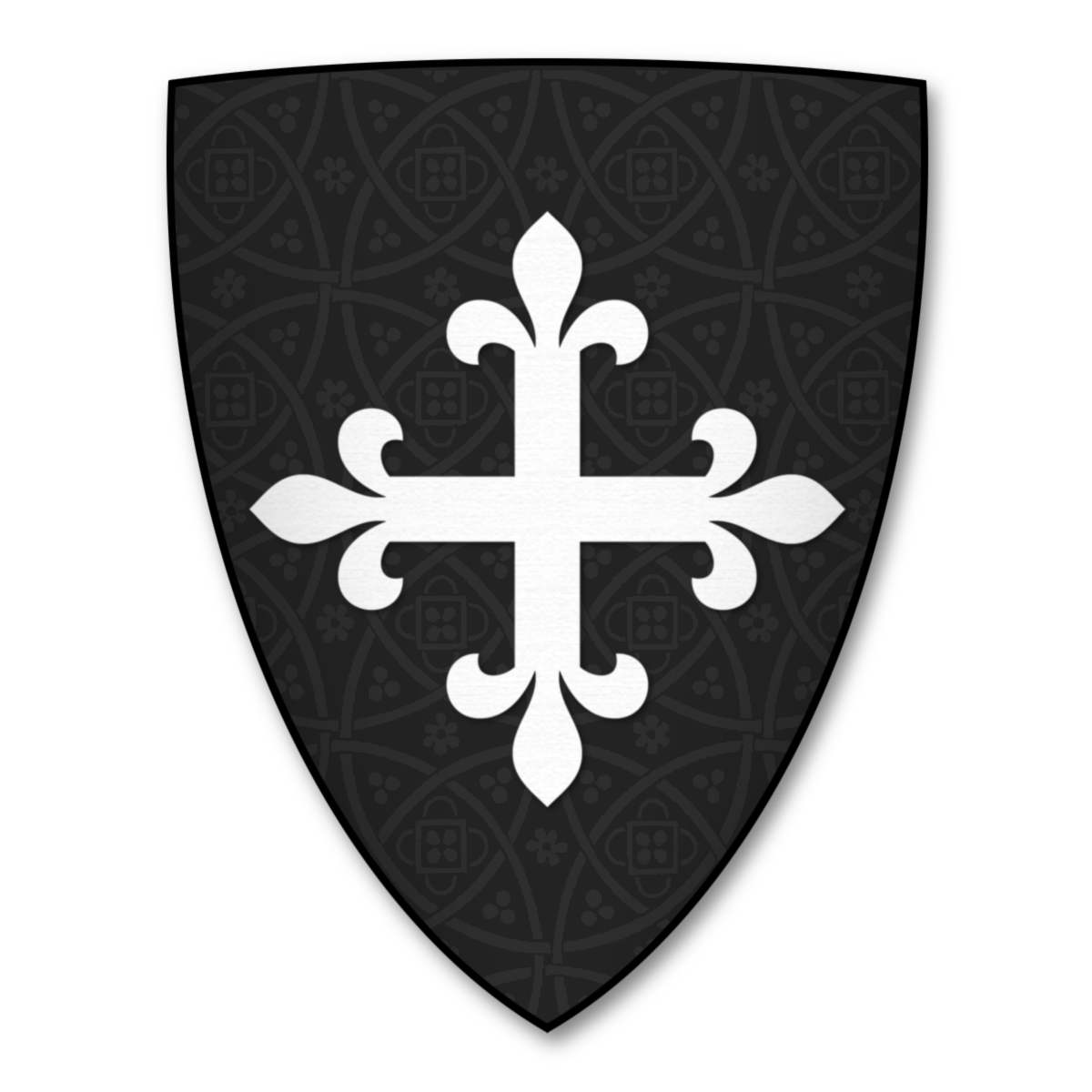
- Coat of arms of Richard Siward
- Noble family: Siward
- Spouses: Firstly: unknown Secondly: Mary
- Father: Richard Siward
- Mother: Philippa Basset, countess of Warwick

Richard Siward (died 1311), Lord of Kellie, was a 13th-14th century Scottish noble. He was the son of the English adventurer Richard Siward and his wife, the wealthy heiress and widow Philippa Basset countess of Warwick, who had married in 1230. His parents divorced in 1242 and young Richard remained in the custody of his father by the terms of the settlement. The Siwards moved north to Scotland after this, where King Alexander II offered the elder Richard a place in his household and gifts of land in Fife, including Kellie and lands in Aberdour. On his death in 1248 the young Richard remained in Scotland, presumably as a royal ward. He inherited no share of his mother's lands.

He was the constable of Wigtown, Dumfries and Kirkcudbright Castles in 1292. Richard was captured at the Battle of Dunbar on 27 April 1296 and held prisoner in the Tower of London until he was released in August 1297. His son John was kept as a hostage for the good behavior of his father.

In 1298 Siward either built a new phase of Tibbers Castle, a fortification under English control. He was the sheriff of Fife in 1305 and the sheriff of Dumfries and the constable of Dumfries Castle in 1306.

After Robert the Bruce killed John Comyn, he captured several English-held castles including Tibbers. Siward was arrested along with several other English officials.

== Family ==
Richard from his first marriage had four children, those known are Richard and John. He married secondly Mary, the widow of Simon Fraser (d.1291) and they had no issue.
