= Tibbers Castle =

Castle in Scotland

- Dumfries and Galloway, Scotland; UK grid reference NY088811
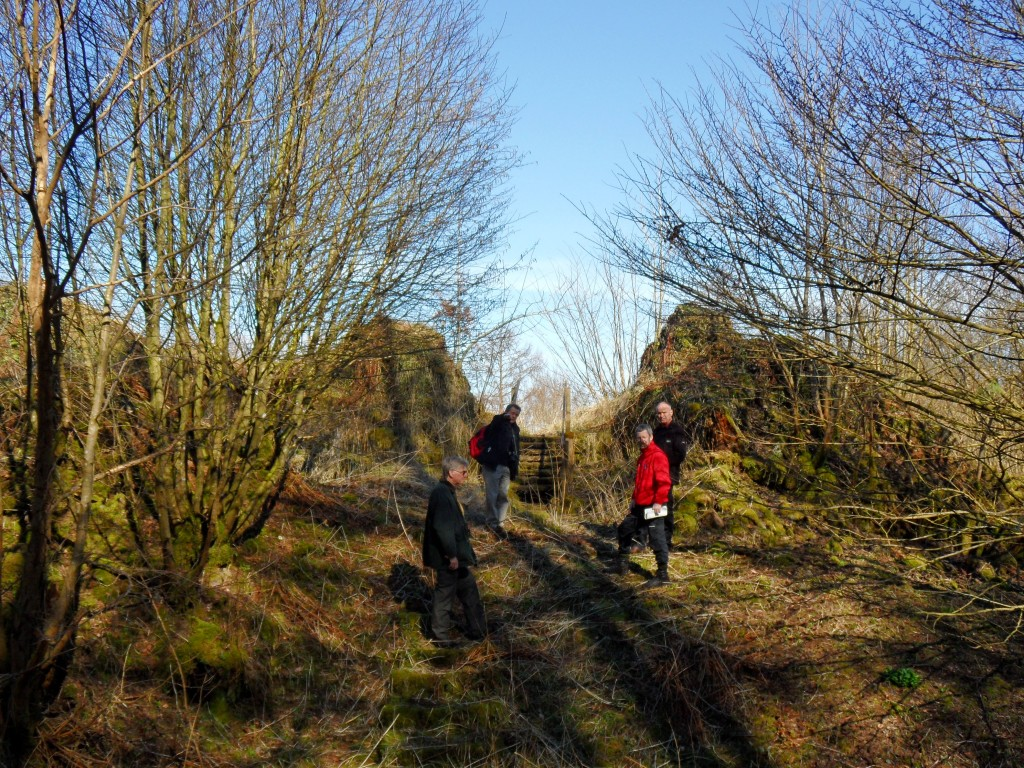
- The motte at Tibbers Castle

Site information
- Type: Castle
- Open to the public: No
- Condition: Ruined

Location
- Shown within Dumfries and Galloway
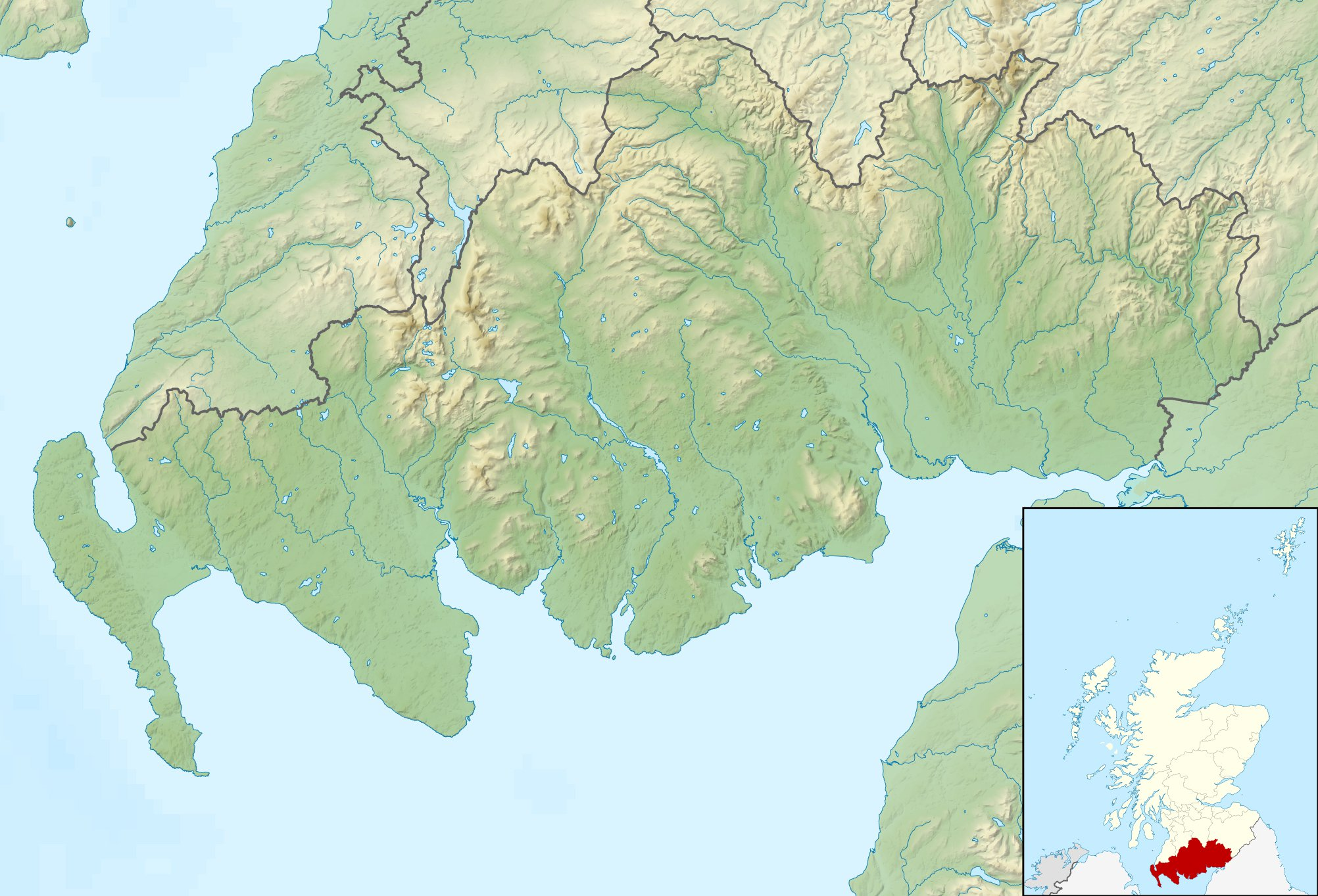
- Location within Dumfries and Galloway
- Coordinates: 55.264167°N 3.792222°W

Site history
- Built: 12th /13th century; rebuilt early 14th century
- Materials: Stone

Tibbers Castle is a motte-and-bailey castle overlooking a ford across the River Nith in Dumfries and Galloway, Scotland. To the east is the village of Carronbridge and to the north west is a 16th-century country house, Drumlanrig Castle.

Possibly built in the 12th or 13th century, Tibbers was first documented in 1298 at which point the timber castle was replaced by a stone castle. It was the administrative centre of the barony of Tibbers until the second half of the 14th century when it shifted to nearby Morton. During the Anglo-Scottish Wars of the early 14th century the castle was captured first, by the Scots under Robert the Bruce and then by the English, before returning to Scottish control in 1313.

The castle descended through the Earls of Moray and subsequently the Earls of March before coming under the control of the Scottish Crown. A 'toun' was established near the castle. While it is unclear at what point Tibbers Castle fell out of use, by the 18th century the site was used for agriculture. Archaeological investigations took place in 1864, 1912, and 2013–2014.

== History ==
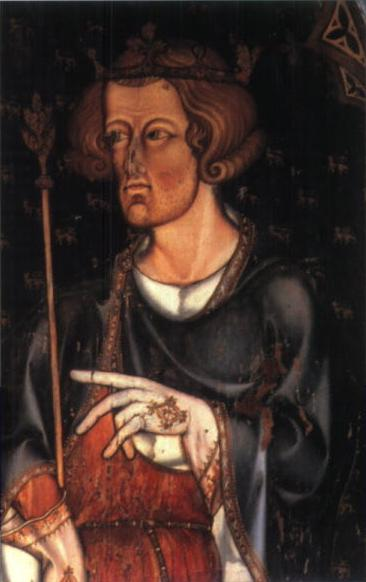
Edward I of England visited Tibbers Castle in 1298.

The origin of Tibbers Castle is undocumented, and it may have been founded in the 12th or 13th century as a timber castle. It was first recorded in 1298 when Sir Richard Siward, either built the stone enclosure castle or enhanced one which had already been added to the timber structure. King Edward I of England visited the castle the same year. Siward was the Sheriff of Dumfries when the area was under the control of the English and documentation from this period gives some evidence for activity at the castle. In 1302, £100 was spent on the structure while it was manned by a 23-strong garrison.

The death of Alexander III of Scotland in 1286 led to a succession crisis resulting in English rule of Scotland under Edward I. Robert the Bruce's family was one of the claimants and in 1306 he was crowned king, leading to war with England. The first phase of Bruce's campaign in 1306 was to capture the English-held castles of Ayr, Dalswinton, Inverkip and Tibbers and control of Tibbers was given to John de Seton. The English had recaptured Tibbers by 22 February 1306, hanged the defenders, and installed a larger garrison, this time numbering 54. In 1313 the Scots regained control of the region. From there Tibbers Castle remained in Scottish hands, and was held by Thomas Randolph, 1st Earl of Moray. He was succeeded by Thomas Randolph, 2nd Earl of Moray and John Randolph, 3rd Earl of Moray. When John died at the battle of Neville's Cross in 1346 the earldom along with Tibbers Castle was given to Patrick, Earl of March. His son inherited it in 1369 and acquired the barony of Morton which probably became the administrative centre for the barony of Tibbers. The estates descended through the Dunbar family until 1435 when their lands were confiscated by the Scottish Crown. In 1450 or 1451, King James II of Scotland subsequently gave Tibbers to George Crichton, Lord High Admiral of Scotland and later the 1st Earl of Caithness. When he died in 1454 the property again came under royal control.

A 'toun' or township at Tibbers was mentioned in 1451, and the presence of the castle did not prevent the town from being attacked by Sir Alexander Stewart of Garlies in 1547. It is unclear when Tibbers Castle fell out of use, but in the 18th century, the ridge on which the castle sits was used to grow crops. Part of the structure was demolished to reuse materials such as lime. The "Mote de Tibbris" is mentioned in the Registrum Magni Sigilli in 1489 and 1541.

The interpretation of Tibbers has changed over time, and in the 18th century it was thought to be a Roman fort though it was later understood to be a medieval castle. The name of the castle led to the suggestion that it derived from Tiberius Caesar, however 'Tibbers' comes from the Gaelic word 'Toibar' meaning a well. The earliest recorded excavation at Tibbers Castle took place in 1864, which recovered two coins from the reign of Edward II of England (1307–1327) and a dagger from the early 15th century. The site was surveyed in 1912 with no further archaeological investigation until the 21st century. It was designated as a scheduled ancient monument in 1937. In 2013 and 2014 the Royal Commission on the Ancient and Historical Monuments of Scotland carried out measured and geophysical (using resistivity and a gradiometer) surveys at Tibbers with funding from Historic Scotland and the Castle Studies Trust.

== Layout ==
Occupying a ridge on the west bank of the River Nith, the earliest phase of the castle consisted of a small bailey or enclosure. This bailey was revealed by the geophysical survey in 2014 which also indicated that it contained timber buildings.

When Richard Siward remodelled the castle c. 1298 it is likely that he added the motte with its stone enclosure castle and replaced the single small bailey with two large enclosures south of the motte. These enclosures may have housed a market as was the case at Lochmaben Castle. There are few examples in Scotland of earthwork castles being rebuilt in stone. The four-sided motte measures 44 by 27 metres (144 by 89 ft) at the summit. The enclosure castle on top is roughly rectangular, measuring 26.8 by 11.6 metres (88 by 38 ft), with a round tower at each corner. Little survives above ground of this structure, though the south-south-east tower survives best. The south side of the enclosure castle had an additional tower which, together with the south-south-east corner tower, flanked the entrance. Inside, the castle had a well on the east side and a range of buildings extending along the west and north sides; these likely contained a great hall, the kitchens, and a chamber. There was a postern gate just south of the north-east tower. This phase of Tibbers is "one of the few authentic surviving remnants of English castle building in Scotland during the Plantagenet occupation."

At its greatest extent Tibbers Castle measured 330 metres (1,080 ft) by 85 metres (279 ft). The courtyard of the enclosure castle is the inner bailey. The outer and outermost baileys each cover an area of about 0.4 hectares (0.99 acres). The ramparts enclosing the site survive to a height of 0.5 metres (1 ft 8 in) and are between 3.4 and 5.5 metres (11 and 18 ft) wide. Double baileys are uncommon, with examples at Windsor Castle and Llandinam Castle.

== See also ==
- List of castles in Scotland
- Morton Castle

== Bibliography ==
- Barrow, G. W. S. (2008). "Robert I (1274–1329)". Oxford Dictionary of National Biography. Oxford Dictionary of National Biography. Vol. 1 (online ed.). Oxford University Press. doi:10.1093/ref:odnb/3754. (Subscription, Wikipedia Library access or UK public library membership required.) (subscription required)
- Brown, Michael (2004), The Wars of Scotland, 1214–1371, Edinburgh University Press, ISBN 978-0-7486-1238-3
- Chalmers, George (1807), Caledonia: or an Account, Historical and Topographical, of North Britain; from the most ancient to the present times with a dictionary of places Chorographical and Philological, vol. 1, Cadell and Davies
- Christison, David (1890–91), "A General View of the Forts, Camps, and Motes of Dumfriesshire, with a detailed description of those in Upper Annandale, and an introduction to the study of Scottish Motes" (PDF), Proceedings of the Society of Antiquaries of Scotland, 25: 198–256 – via Archaeology Data Service
- Coventry, Martin (2006), The Castles of Scotland (4th ed.), Birlinn Limited, ISBN 978-1-84158-449-2
- Dixon, Piers; Anderson, Iain; O'Grady, Oliver (2015), The evolution of a castle, Tibbers, Dumfriesshire: Measured and geophysical survey, 2013–14 (PDF), Royal Commission on the Ancient and Historical Monuments of Scotland and the Castle Studies Trust
- Historic Environment Scotland. "Tibbers Castle (SM711)".
- McNamee, Colm (1997), The Wars of the Bruces: Scotland, England and Ireland, 1306–1328, Tuckwell Press, ISBN 1-898410-92-5
- Prestwich, Michael (1997) [1988], Edward I (2nd ed.), Yale University Press, ISBN 978-0-300-07157-3
- Royal Archaeological Institute (1940), "The summer meeting at Dumfries: Tibbers Castle" (PDF), The Archaeological Journal, 96: 334–335
- Smith, George (1845), The New Statistical Account of Scotland, vol. 4, William Blackwood and Sons, pp. 499–516
