= William Hinton Campbell =

English architect (1819–1855)

- Born: 1819
- Died: 3 November 1855 (aged 35–36)
- Occupation: Architect

William Hinton Campbell (1819-55) was an English architect who won gold and silver medals from the Royal Academy, London. After working in Bath and London, he emigrated to Australia. He formally retired from architecture in 1854. He started the first steam ferry service between Perth and Fremantle.

== Family life ==
William Campbell was born in 1819, the son of John Campbell, an Irish-born army major, and Ann Baker, an heiress from the Isle of Wight. He was named after William Hinton, a farmer who left a bequest of £300 a year to his mother. Campbell was the second William Hinton; his older brother died as a baby while his family were in the West Indies.

In 1844 Campbell married Hannah Bird, the daughter of a grocer in Park Street, London.

== Career ==
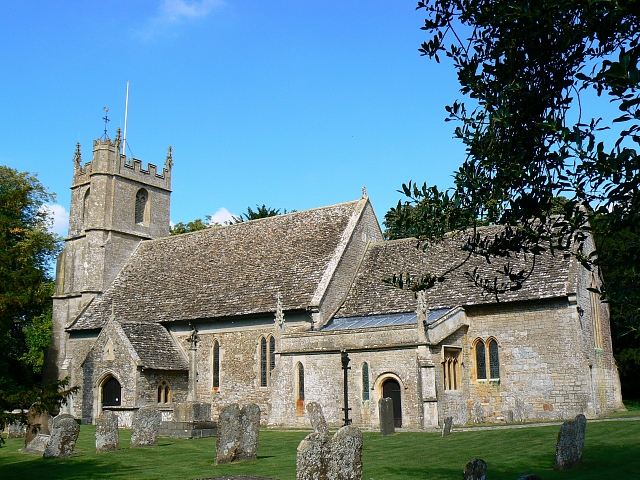
The church of St Peter ad Vincula in Broad Hinton, for which Campbell designed furniture.

On 16 March 1840, Campbell became an associate of the Royal Institute of British Architects, proposed by architects Philip Hardwick, John Shaw Jr. and Ambrose Poynter.

He was recommended to the RA by Hardwick and began his studies in Piccadilly, London on 21 April 1840. At the time he was living at 16 Daniel Street, Bath. The Directory of British Architects 1834-1914 says that in 1840 Campbell was a pupil of Henry Goodridge (1797-1864). He won the RA silver medal for architecture in 1840. His work for this included “Elevation, St Martin-in-the-Fields”.

He won the gold medal in 1841 (one of three presented that year, and the only one for architecture). His work for this included “A Design for a House of Lords and Common [sic]” and “The Front of a Theatre”.

In 1842, the St Martin-in-the-Fields and Parliament drawings were shown at the Academy summer show.

Campbell designed a pulpit, desk and stalls for Broad Hinton church, Wiltshire, in 1843.

He exhibited at the RA twice more, in 1844 and 1849. The first work was Portsea Island Union Workhouse and the second was the new assize courts, Liverpool, “from a design by the late Harvey Lonsdale Elmes”. The courts are part of St George's Hall, Liverpool.

During his career his addresses included Daniel Street, Bath and Park Street, Argyll Street, Oakley Square, and Mornington Crescent, London.

Campbell formally retired from architecture in 1854.

== Emigration ==
Campbell and his wife emigrated to Australia in the early 1850s but his wife died in Melbourne in 1853. It is not known if they had any children. Campbell then went to Perth where he bought a boat, Les Trois Amis, starting the first steam ferry service between Perth and Fremantle.

== Death ==
On 3 November 1855 Campbell swam after his dinghy which had broken loose. His trowsers [sic] came down while he was in the water and he drowned. He was 36 years old. He was buried at East Perth Cemeteries on 6 November.

In 1856 there was a grant of letters of administration to the Supreme Court of Western Australia. In 1872–73 there was a court case in connection with the distribution of his late mother's money.

== Family connections ==
Campbell was the uncle of singer and opera company manager Charles Manners by his sister Jane Campbell (1834–1900). Manners was born two years after William Hinton Campbell's death.
