= Wigtown Castle =

Coordinates: 54.8653°N 4.4365°W

Wigtown Castle was a royal castle that was located on the banks of the River Bladnoch, south of Wigtown in Dumfries and Galloway, Scotland.

A castle was built in the 12th century. Robert de Brus, 5th Lord of Annandale captured the castle in 1286. The castle was handed over to King Edward I of England in 1291 by Sir Walter de Corrie, the governor of the castle. Richard Siward became the governor of the castle in 1292, being replaced by Henry de Percy in 1296, and John de Hodleston in 1297. The castle was captured by Sir William Wallace in 1297. Adam Gordon became the governor in 1297. King Robert the Bruce captured the castle after 1313 and it appears to have been demolished.

The site became a Scheduled Monument in 2004.
