= Feudal barony of Curry Mallet =

The feudal barony of Curry Mallet was an English feudal barony with its caput at Curry Mallet Castle in Somerset, about 7 miles east of Taunton.

== Descent ==
=== de Courcelles ===
The de Courcelles family were from Courseulles-sur-Mer in Calvados, Normandy.

- William de Courcelles, whose name appears on records immediately after the Norman Conquest of 1066.
- Roger de Courcelles (fl.1121), his powerful son, who was the Lord and Tenant-in-Chief of the manor of Curry Mallet in the Domesday Book of 1086, and numerous other manors throughout Somerset.
- Waldric de Courcelles, son, who witnessed a royal deed in 1103/6

=== Malet ===
Nothing substantive is known concerning the origin of the Malet family of Somerset. It cannot from surviving records be traced back to William Malet (died 1071), one of the few proven companions of William the Conqueror known to have been present at the Battle of Hastings in 1066, as recorded by the contemporary chronicler William of Poitiers (c. 1020–1090). The former held substantial property in Normandy, chiefly in the Pays de Caux, with a castle at Graville-Ste-Honorine, at the mouth of the River Seine near Harfleur (nowadays a suburb of Le Havre).

- Robert Malet (fl. 1130, died pre-1156), who appears for reason unknown to have succeeded the de Courcelles family at some time before the death of King Henry I (1100–1135). He is mentioned in deeds dated 1130 concerning Warminster in Wiltshire.
- William I Malet (d.1169), heir.
- Gilbert Malet (d.1194), heir.

Arms of Malet, adopted at the start of the age of heraldry (circa 1200–1215): Azure, three escallops or

- William II Malet (d.c. 1216), heir. He was one of the guarantors of Magna Carta in 1216. He died without male progeny when his three daughters became his co-heiresses:
  - Bertha Malet (d.pre-1221), who inherited 1/3 of her father's estates and died unmarried.
  - Helewise Malet, who inherited 1/3 (later increased to a moiety of 1/2) of her father's estates and who at some time before 23 March 1217 married Hugh I Poyntz (d.1220). She married secondly Robert de Mucegros (d.1254) of Brewham, Somerset.
  - Mabel Malet, who inherited 1/3 (later increased to a moiety of 1/2) of her father's estates. She married firstly Nicholas Avenel and secondly, before November 1223, Hugh de Vivonia (d.1249) (alias de Forz) of Chewton, Somerset.

=== Poyntz moiety ===
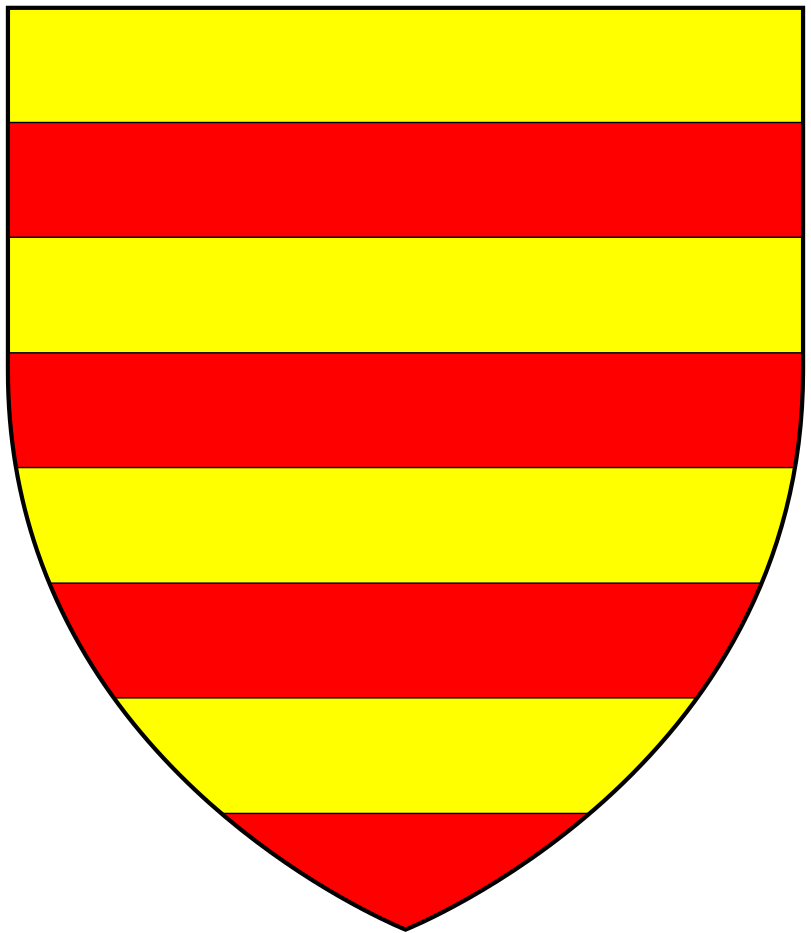
Arms of Poyntz: Barry of eight or and gules

- Hugh I Poyntz (d.1220), who married (as her 1st husband) Helewise Malet, heiress of a moiety of the barony. He was the son and heir of Nicholas Poyntz by his wife Julyana Bardolph, daughter of Hugh Bardolph, brother of William Bardolph and one of the heiresses of Robert, Lord Bardolph.
- Nicholas I Poyntz (d.1273), son, who married Elizabeth de la Zouche, a daughter of William de la Zouche by his wife Milisent Monhalt.

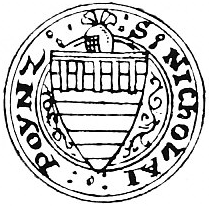
Seal of Hugh II Poyntz (d.1307), feudal baron of Curry Mallet, attached to the Barons' Letter to the Pope, 1301. (Apparently the seal of his father Nicholas I Poyntz (d.1273)). Arms: Barry of eight or and gules a label of five points. legend: S(IGILLUM) NICHOLAI POYNZ ("Seal of Nicholas Poyntz")

- Hugh II Poyntz (d.1307), son, who held half the barony by the service of one knight. He was one of the many barons who sealed the Barons' Letter to the Pope of 1301, in which he was termed in Latin Hugo Poyntz, D(omi)n(u)s de Corimalet ("Lord of Curry Mallet"). In 1279 he was charged scutage on half the barony. He married Margaret Paynel, daughter of Walter Paynel, lord of Brooke, Wiltshire.
- Nicholas II Poyntz (d.1311), heir. He married twice:
  - Firstly to Elizabeth de la Zouche, daughter of Edward de la Zouche of Haringworth Castle, Northamptonshire
  - Secondly to Maud (alias Matilda) de Acton, daughter and eventual heiress of Sir John Acton (d.1312) of Iron Acton in Gloucestershire. The descendants of this second marriage founded the Poyntz family of Iron Acton, which became very prominent in the reign of the Tudor monarchs and afterwards.
- Hugh III Poyntz (d.1337), son and heir by his father's first marriage, who according to the pedigree in the heraldic visitation of Gloucestershire, apparently duplicated for the wife of his grandfather, married Margaret Paynel, daughter of Sir Walter Paynel, lord of Brooke, Wiltshire.
- Nicholas Poyntz (d.1368), son, who married Elianora Erleghe, daughter of John Erleghe. He left no male progeny, only two daughters and co-heiresses:
  - Margaret Poyntz, wife of Sir John Newburghe
  - Amicia Poyntz, wife of John Barry

=== de Vivonia/de Forz moiety ===
- Hugh de Vivonia (d.1249) (alias de Forz) of Chewton, Somerset, who married (as her second husband) Mabel Malet, heiress of a moiety of the barony.
- William de Vivonia/de Forz (d.1259), son, who married Maud de Ferrers (d.1299), daughter of William de Ferrers, 5th Earl of Derby (d.1254) and widow of Simon de Kyme (d.1248). He died without male progeny, leaving his wife, who remarried to Amaury, Vicomte de Rochechouart in Poitou, and four infant daughters as his co-heiresses:
  - Joan de Vivonia/de Forz (d.1314), who inherited 1/8 of the barony and married (as his second wife) Reginald FitzPiers (d.1286). Her son and heir was Peter FitzReginald (d.1322), who was succeeded by his grandson Henry (FitzRoger?), son of Roger FitzPeter.
  - Sibyl de Vivonia/de Forz who inherited 1/8 of the barony and married Guy de Rochechouart. Both were still alive in 1306 after which nothing is known about them.
  - Mabel de Vivonia/de Forz (d.1295/9) who inherited 1/8 of the barony and at some time before 1275 married Fulk, Lord of Archaic in Saintonge (d.1295/9). She was succeeded by, perhaps her son, Aymer (d.1313), who died without progeny, whose heir was his brother Fulk II, about whom little is known other than some of his lands passed to Cecily de Beauchamp.
  - Cecily de Vivonia/de Forz (d.1320) who inherited 1/8 of the barony and married John de Beauchamp (d.1283), feudal baron of Hatch Beauchamp, Somerset. They had a son and heir, John Beauchamp, 1st Baron Beauchamp of Somerset.

== Sources ==
- Sanders, I.J. English Baronies: A Study of their Origin and Descent 1086–1327, Oxford, 1960, pp. 38–9, Curry Malet
