= Berwick Bassett =

Village in Wiltshire, England

Coordinates: 51.459°N 1.859°W

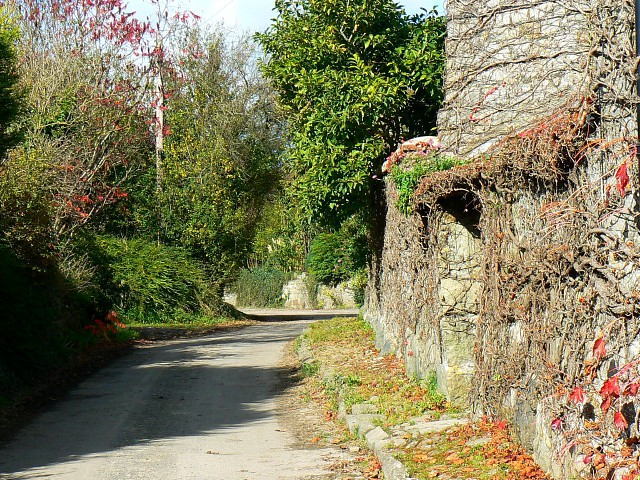

- Location within Wiltshire
- Population: 43 (in 2011)
- OS grid reference: SU099733
- Unitary authority: Wiltshire
- Ceremonial county: Wiltshire
- Region: South West
- Country: England
- Sovereign state: United Kingdom
- Post town: SWINDON
- Postcode district: SN4
- Dialling code: 01793
- Police: Wiltshire
- Fire: Dorset and Wiltshire
- Ambulance: South Western
- UK Parliament: East Wiltshire
- Website: bbwmpc.org

Berwick Bassett is a small village and civil parish in Wiltshire, England, about 6 miles (10 km) northwest of Marlborough and 8 miles (13 km) southwest of Swindon. The village is on the west bank of a headstream of the River Kennet and close to the A4361 road, formerly the A361, which links Devizes and Avebury with Wroughton and Swindon.

== Geography ==
The parish of Berwick Bassett is part of Calne Hundred and comprises about 1400 acres about 3 mi (5 km) north of Avebury. It has a slender rectangular shape, oriented east and west, and is crossed from north to south by the upper part of the River Kennet, which flows only in the winter months. The village of Berwick Basset lies to the west of the stream and has a small village green close to the bridge, around which are clustered the Manor, Home Farm and Berwick House Farm.

== History ==
There are a number of ancient sites in the parish; these include flint tools, Romano-British pottery fragments, cropmarks, enclosures, a round barrow and a medieval farmstead. The ancient trackway known as the Ridgeway forms the eastern boundary of the parish.

The name Berwick derives from the Old English berewīc meaning 'barley farm'. Berwick was not recorded in the Domesday Book of 1086 and was probably part of the king's Calne estate. The Bassett suffix arose after the manor was granted in 1206 to Alan Basset. He was succeeded by three of his sons in turn: Gilbert, Fulk (who went on to become Bishop of London), and Philip (Chief Justiciar). The Wiltshire Victoria County History recounts the later landowners.

Manor Farmhouse or Old Manor House, next to the church, is from the late 15th century or early 16th. The newer Manor House, near the stream, is from the early 17th.

The population of the parish peaked at 203 at the time of the 1851 census. A National school was built near the church in 1847 and was in use until 1922.

== Local government ==
Berwick Bassett is in the area of Wiltshire Council unitary authority, which is responsible for all significant local government functions. It elects a joint parish council with the adjacent parish of Winterbourne Monkton.

== Church ==
St Nicholas's Church dates from the early 13th century. Having been declared redundant in 1972, the Grade II* listed building is now in the care of the Churches Conservation Trust. The parish of Winterbourne Monkton with Berwick Bassett is part of the Upper Kennet benefice.
