= Thomas Basset (died 1220) =

Anglo-Norman lord and royal counsellor

Sites significant to Thomas Basset
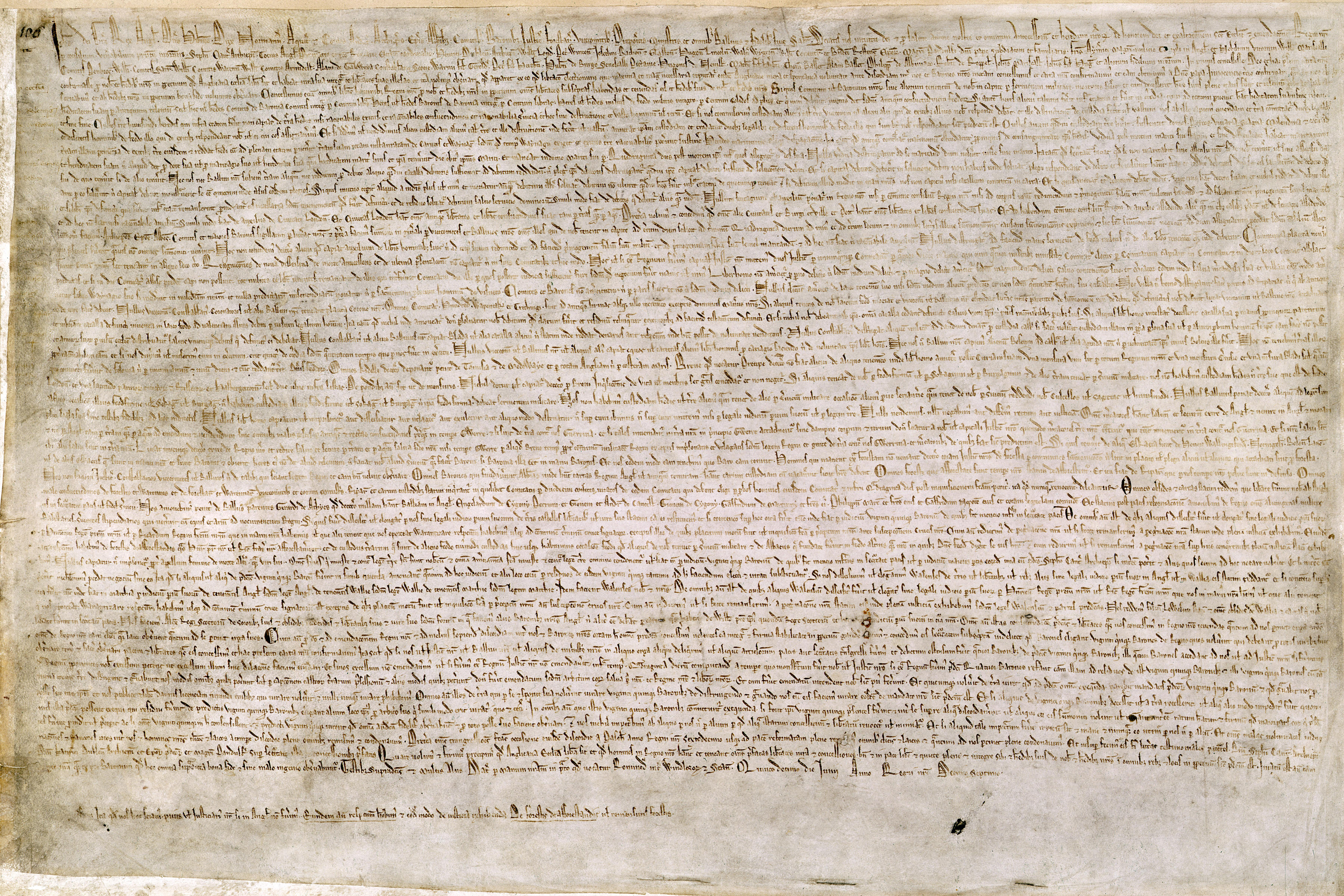
Basset's name (as Ꞇhom̄ Baſſet) on the British Library Cotton MS of Magna Carta.

Thomas Basset (c. 1156–1220), called Thomas Basset of Headington or Thomas Basset of Colinton, was an Anglo-Norman lord and royal counsellor to King John of England.

Thomas was eldest son of Adeliza (née de Dunstanville) and Thomas Basset of Headington, Oxfordshire. When his brother Gilbert died in 1202, Thomas inherited the lordship of Headington as well as land at Colyton and Whitford in Devon. When Waleran de Beaumont, 4th Earl of Warwick died in 1204, his son Henry de Beaumont, 5th Earl of Warwick (then aged 12) was made a ward of Thomas'.

Basset was an advisor of King John from the 1190s onwards. On one occasion he ate with the king when he was supposed to be fasting; as penance, he had to feed 20 paupers. He was Constable of Dover Castle in 1202.

Basset is notable as one of 27 ecclesiastical and secular magnates who had counselled John to accept the terms of Magna Carta in 1215 and is named in the preamble to the document; his younger brother Alan was also named among the counsellors on the charter.

In 1217 Basset commanded at the Battle of Lincoln. In 1218 Thomas Basset was High Sheriff of Oxfordshire and High Sheriff of Berkshire.

Basset married Philippa, daughter of William Malbank, 3rd Baron of Wich Malbank and they had three daughters:

- Philippa, who married her foster-brother Henry de Beaumont, 5th Earl of Warwick; he died in 1229, and she married Richard Siward in 1236/7
- Joane or Juliana, who married John Biset, Chief Forester of England
- Alice, who married William Malet, one of the barons named in Magna Carta.

Basset endowed Bicester Priory (founded by his brother Gilbert in 1183). He died in 1220 (before October, aged about 64) and his lands were divided amongst his daughters, his will being drawn up by Peter des Roches.
