= Broad Hinton =

Village in Wiltshire, England

Coordinates: 51.487°N 01.850°W

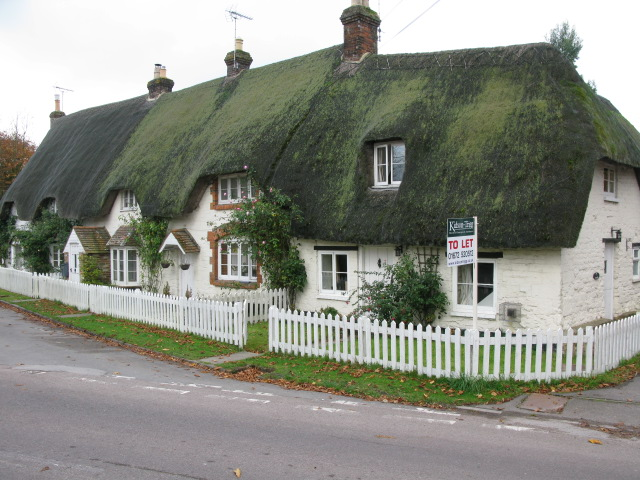
- High Street, Broad Hinton

- Location within Wiltshire
- Population: 650 (in 2011)
- OS grid reference: SU105765
- Civil parish: Broad Hinton
- Unitary authority: Wiltshire
- Ceremonial county: Wiltshire
- Region: South West
- Country: England
- Sovereign state: United Kingdom
- Post town: SWINDON
- Postcode district: SN4
- Dialling code: 01793
- Police: Wiltshire
- Fire: Dorset and Wiltshire
- Ambulance: South Western
- UK Parliament: Chippenham
- Website: Parish Council

Broad Hinton is a village and civil parish in Wiltshire, England, about 5 miles (8 km) southwest of Swindon. The parish includes the hamlets of Uffcott and The Weir. It shares a grouped parish council with the neighbouring parish of Winterbourne Bassett. In 2011 the parish had a population of 650.

== History ==
There are several barrows in the parish, notably on Hackpen Hill. East of The Weir is a Romano-British burial site and possibly the remains of a house of that period.

Bincknoll Castle is an earthwork on a promontory on a chalk escarpment in the northernmost part of the parish. It is the remains of a fortified enclosure, possibly Romano-British in origin, that was re-used in the Middle Ages.

The name Hinton derives from the Old English hēahtūn meaning 'high settlement'.

The Domesday Book of 1086 records that a man called Ranulph held the manor of Broad Hinton. It then passed to the Wase family and became known as Hinton Wase. In 1365 Nicholas Wase sold the manor to William Wroughton (died 1392), whose family then held Broad Hinton until 1628 when Sir Giles Wroughton sold it to Sir John Glanville, MP and later Speaker of the House of Commons. He was a cousin of John Evelyn's wife, and the diarist visited him at Broad Hinton in 1654, noting that he was living in the manor's gatehouse because he had burnt down his home to prevent the Roundheads setting up a garrison there during the Civil War. In 1709 a later John Glanville sold the manor to Thomas Bennet, from whom it descended via the female line through the Legh, Keck and Calley families. In 1839 James Calley sold Broad Hinton to the Duke of Wellington. In 1867 his son the 2nd Duke of Wellington sold Broad Hinton to N. Story-Maskelyne, who in 1869 sold it on to the former MP Sir Henry Meux, 2nd Baronet. Sir Henry died in 1900 and his widow Lady Meux had the manor broken up and auctioned in several lots in 1906.

== Parish church ==
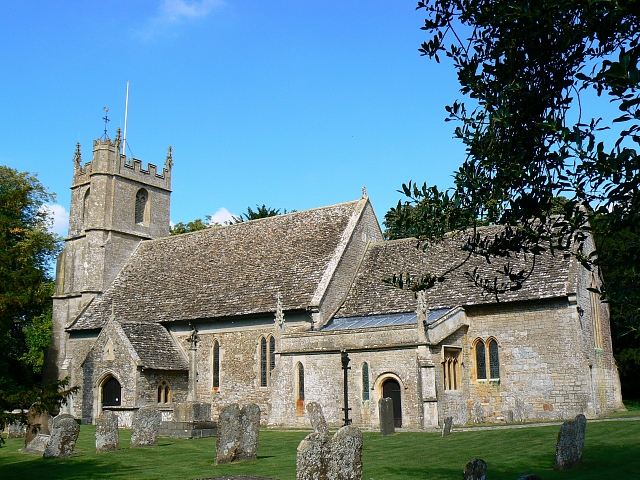
St Peter ad Vincula

The Church of England parish church of Saint Peter ad Vincula ("St Peter in Chains") is one of only 15 churches in England with this dedication, which is in honour of the Basilica of San Pietro in Vincoli in Rome.

The earliest parts of the church building date from late in the 12th century. They include an Early English Gothic priest's doorway, which was later moved from the chancel to the organ chamber. In the 13th century the chancel was rebuilt, the nave was altered and the church was dedicated to Saint Mary. The Perpendicular Gothic tower was built in the 15th or early in the 16th century. A rood stair was inserted early in the 16th century. The nave was re-roofed in 1634 and the east end of the chancel was altered or rebuilt in the 18th century.

In the 19th century the church was called St. Peter's. In 1843 a pulpit, desk and stalls were designed for the church by the architect William Hinton Campbell; it is not known if these were ever made and, if so, whether they survive. The building was restored in 1879 to plans by the Gothic Revival architect C.E. Ponting of Marlborough. He had a new, wider chancel arch built and re-used the old one to link the chancel with the organ chamber. In 1958 the church was designated as Grade I listed.

=== Monuments ===
The church contains several imposing monuments, notably to members of the Wroughton and Glanville families.

There are indents of two lost brasses in the chancel, both knights in armour. The earlier was probably to William Wroughton (died 1392) and the later was certainly to his grandson, John Wroughton (died 1429).

The monument to John's great-great-grandson, Sir William Wroughton (died 1559), is early Elizabethan, canopied, and shows influence of the previous Perpendicular Gothic style. Despite an inscription in praise of Queen Elizabeth, it includes subtle references to his Roman Catholic sympathies. The monument to his son, Sir Thomas Wroughton (died 1597) and his wife, is a large standing monument, with figures of Sir Thomas and Lady Wroughton kneeling in prayer and facing east. An old legend tells how Sir Thomas is shown with no hands because they withered away after he threw his wife's Bible in the fire. He had returned home from hunting to find her reading it rather than making his supper and was not best pleased.

Colonel Francis Glanville, a younger son of Speaker Glanville, was a Royalist soldier in the English Civil War. He was killed in 1645 when a Parliamentarian force besieged the Royalist-held town of Bridgwater in Somerset. His monument at Broad Hinton is a standing alabaster statue, wearing armour and holding the metal staff of a standard. His real armour is displayed above the monument.

== Governance ==
There are two tiers of local government covering Broad Hinton, at parish and unitary authority level: Broad Hinton and Winterbourne Bassett Parish Council and Wiltshire Council. The parish council is a grouped parish council, covering the two parishes of Broad Hinton and Winterbourne Bassett.

== Amenities ==
Broad Hinton has an Italian restaurant, La Strada, and The Crown Inn, controlled by Arkell's Brewery of Swindon. The village has a village shop and post office and a village hall. Local clubs include the White Horse Cricket Club.

Broad Hinton Church of England Primary School serves the parish and nearby villages. Beginning in 1743, Thomas Benet, a local landowner, paid for a schoolmaster, and in 1751 he provided a house for the school and teacher to use. A classroom was added in 1845 but in 1847 the older, thatched, part of the school burned down; a new school was immediately built in stone. This became a National School in 1882 and a voluntary controlled school in the 20th century.

== Another Broad Hinton ==
This parish near Swindon should not be confused with Broad Hinton, a liberty in the civil parish of Hurst, Berkshire. That part of Hurst was a detached part of Wiltshire until the Counties (Detached Parts) Act 1844 transferred the liberty to Berkshire.

== Sources ==
- Baggs, A. P.; Freeman, Jane; Stevenson, Janet H. (1983). "Parishes: Broad Hinton". In Crowley, D. A. (ed.). A History of the County of Wiltshire, Volume 12. Victoria County History. University of London. pp. 105–119 – via British History Online.
- Pevsner, Nikolaus; Cherry, Bridget (revision) (1975). The Buildings of England: Wiltshire. Harmondsworth: Penguin Books. pp. 146–147. ISBN 0140710264.
