= Richard Siward =

English soldier (died 1248)

- Lord of Tal-y-Fan, Glamorgan
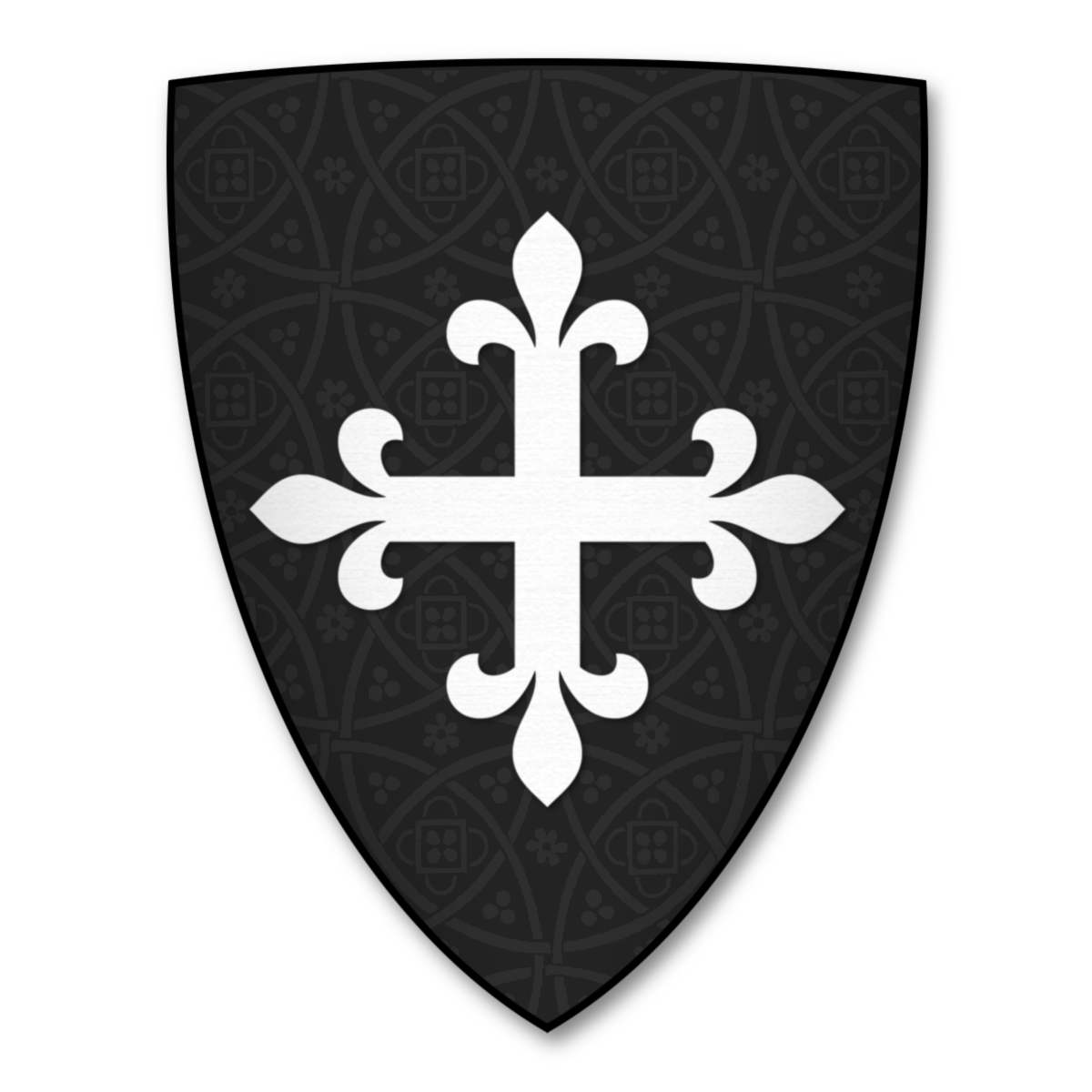
- Coat of arms of Richard Siward
- Died: 1248
- Noble family: Siward
- Spouses: Philippa Basset, countess of Warwick
- Issue: Richard Siward of Kellie; Daniel Siward (illegitimate)
- Occupation: professional soldier

Richard Siward (died 1248) was a distinguished 13th-century soldier, adventurer and banneret. He rose from obscurity to become a member of King Henry III's Royal Council and husband of Philippa Basset, the widowed countess of Warwick.

== Origins ==
Little certain is known about Siward's family pedigree. He has been identified with a Richard son of Siward of Farnham in Lower Nithsdale in Yorkshire who around 1215 was pardoned a homicide on his release into the service of a magnate during the war of the barons against King John. The reason for this is because a Richard son of Siward can be found in the service of William de Forz count of Aumale, a leading Yorkshire baron, in King John's reign. He was the same Richard as the subject of this article and went on to serve the counts of Aumale till 1221 and the earls of Pembroke till 1231 as a leading household knight. His obscure origins have attracted legends amongst later genealogists. One suggests that he was descended from Syward, the Saxon Earl of Northumberland. The 16th-century Glamorganshire antiquary, Rice Merrick, theorised Richard was one of the legendary Twelve Knights whom Robert fitz Hamo settled in Glamorgan after its Conquest, though since that happened before 1100 it is not a serious possibility.

== Household Knight ==
In 1216 Richard Siward appears amongst the leading knights of the younger William Marshal. His move from the Aumale household to William's retinue during the warfare of John's reign is not too difficult to explain. Marshal had spent a large part of his youth fostered in the household of Count Baldwin of Aumale, the stepfather of William de Forz. In the course of the Barons Wars and the Regency that followed Siward acquired some celebrity, being one of the commanders of the English fleet which defeated the French in the sea battle off Sandwich in August 1217. He retained his links with the Aumale household however. In 1220 he supported William de Forz's hopeless rebellion against King Henry III. An account of his activities during this period cited how he led campaigns against the lands of the king's counsellors. Aside from the detailed descriptions of the destruction and booty taken, it was also written that his soldiers "observed one good rule amongst them generally: they did not do any injury or attack any one, except these unjust advisers of the king." The rebellion failed in 1221 though Siward was pardoned later that year.

After this episode Siward returned to the household of Earl William Marshal as one of his principal knights, receiving from him the manor of Great Burstead in Essex. In 1223 Siward was one of the commanders of the Marshal army that overwhelmed the forces of Prince Llywelyn ab Iorwerth in west Wales. There is a record of what may have been Richard's first encounter with the boy king Henry III when he was despatched in the summer from Wales to brief the king and council on the campaign's progress. Some measure of his influence with the Marshals at this time is that he was appointed as tutor and guardian of the earl's younger brother Walter, which included wardship of the boy's manors and his castle at Goodrich. In 1229 Richard's career reached a peak. One of the chief political allies of William Marshal was Gilbert Basset of High Wycombe. In 1229 Gilbert's cousin Philippa Basset, lady of Headington, and wife of the young Earl Henry of Warwick was unexpectedly widowed. Gilbert Basset moved fast to secure control of her marriage and her lands, which included the barony of Headington and considerable estates in the earldom of Warwick. Then he married Countess Philippa to his friend, Richard Siward.

== The Marshal War ==
After 1229 Siward cuts a more independent figure in the sources and after the death in 1231 of his lord, Earl William Marshal, he did not enter the household of the new earl Richard Marshal. In 1230 he participated in the young king's campaign in Brittany not as a Marshal follower but as a royal tenant-in-chief. Very soon however he was once more embroiled in a rebellion against King Henry. This was the result of the overthrow of the justiciar Hubert de Burgh and the installation of a cabal of exiled foreign favourites, led by Peter des Roches, bishop of Winchester. One of these demanded back a manor which had come in the meantime to Gilbert Basset. When Basset resisted the king abused him as a traitor and sided with Des Roches. Siward aligned with the Bassets and their party withdrew to the marches to put themselves under the protection of Earl Richard Marshal. In August 1233 the earl aligned with Basset against the king and rebellion broke out.

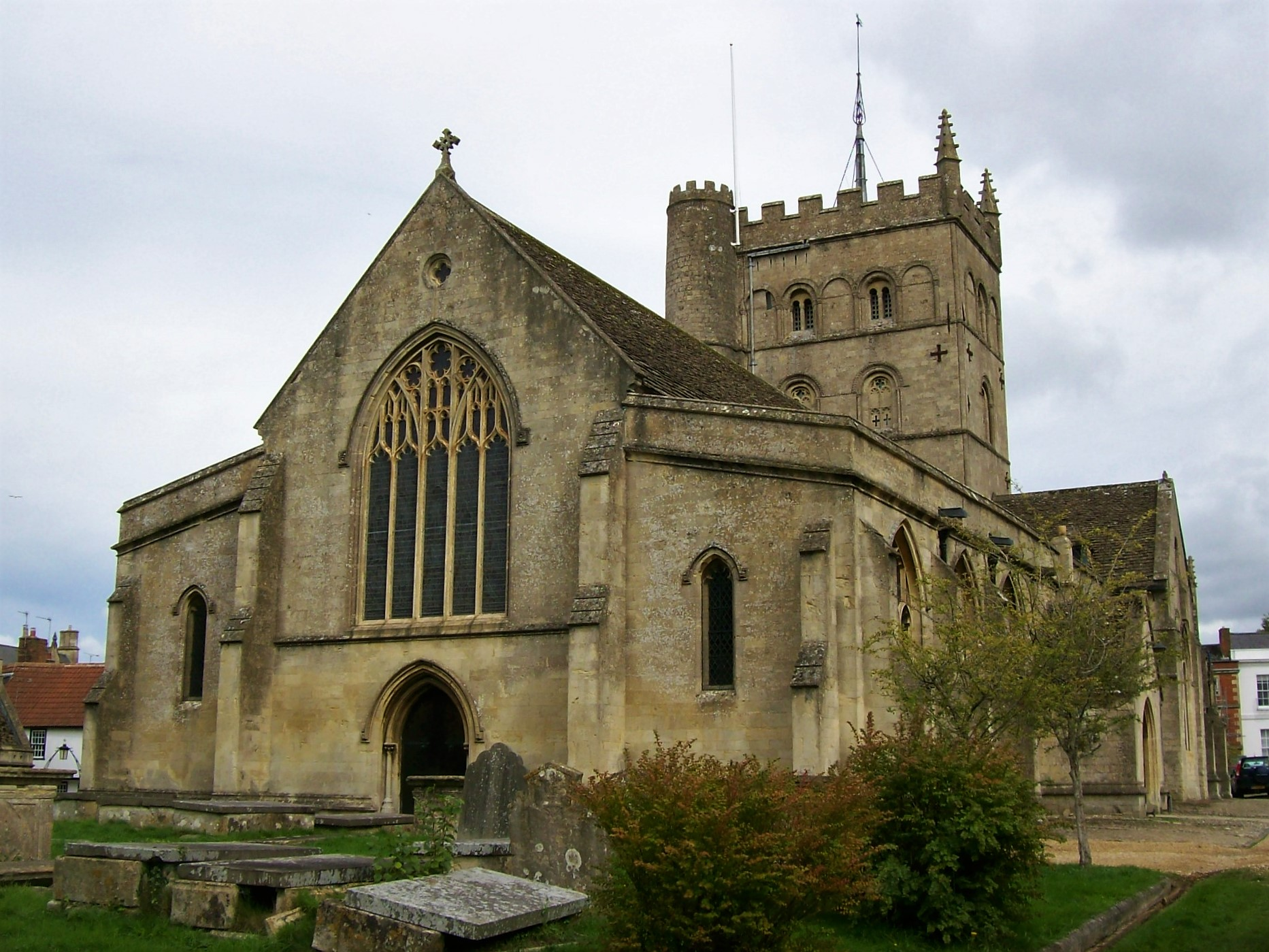
Church of St John Baptist, Devizes, where Siward rescued Hubert de Burgh from a siege in 1233

Siward's daring chevauchées out of the March were a spectacular feature of the war, which was otherwise a stalemate, and ended with the earl's death in April 1234 at the battle of the Curragh. Siward led a great cavalry raid across the Cotswolds in September that crossed Oxfordshire and at Langley in Berkshire on 28 September seized the bishop of Winchester's baggage, riding onwards perhaps as far as Kent before doubling back to the Marches, leaving panic in their wake. Siward's second great raid occurred a month later. Hubert de Burgh had been held captive in Devizes castle in Wiltshire, but during October 1233 he had escaped confinement and took refuge in the town church, where he was besieged by royal officers. On 29 October Siward and a small raiding column appeared and drove off the king's soldiers, who ran in panic thinking Prince Llywelyn or Richard Marshal were upon them. Siward liberated De Burgh (who he had fought alongside at Sandwich in 1217) and escaped with him to the Severn crossing at Aust where Marshal ships picked him and his men up. Around Christmas, Siward's raiding became more general across England and sparked local insurrections as far as Leicestershire. They particularly targeted the manors of the bishop of Winchester and his allies. On 30 April 1234 the king himself was alarmed when one of Siward's columns dogged him as he and his court passed through Windsor forest. He may have appreciated the courtesy that when Siward pillaged the train that followed the king, he paid special attention to Des Roches's baggage, and spared the king's. This sort of gesture as much as the daring of his campaigning may help to account for King Henry's notable favour towards Richard Siward following the end of the rebellion.

== Siward the Courtier ==
In 1234 Siward was given control of Bolsover Castle by the king, showing some confidence in him at the time. His standing at court can be seen in 1236 when he was awarded the great distinction of carrying the gold sceptre in the coronation procession of Queen Eleanor on 27 January 1236, a privilege awarded to eminent soldiers. He was retained as a royal banneret that same year, being paid an annual fee of £100 marks (£66 13s. 4d.). In 1237 the king favoured him in a lawsuit against him being pursued by his stepson, Thomas earl of Warwick. In 1242 he is found serving as a banneret in the king's army in Brittany. But his enemies were many and unrelenting. The king's brother Earl Richard of Cornwall did not forgive his wasting of his lands during the late war and got his brother to banish Siward from court just months after the queen's coronation, after a row between the men in a council meeting. Siward evaded the banishment by taking the cross of a crusader. But another exile from the court was engineered by his enemies in July 1236. The support of an influential friend, King Alexander II of Scotland, helped him evade that crisis. In 1240 however his nemesis came into his inheritance, the young Richard de Clare, earl of Gloucester and in 1241 his position was weakened by the death of his great ally, Gilbert Basset. It was following Gilbert's death that Countess Philippa was able to bring divorce proceedings against her politically weakened husband, who by September 1242 had consented to a separation. It seems that not long afterwards a disconsolate Siward moved to Scotland and took up a position offered him in the household of his friend, King Alexander, where he was still to be found in 1244. He took with him the son he had by Philippa, who was fostered by the king.

== The Last Adventure ==
One of the greatest acts of favour by King Henry to Siward in the autumn of 1234 was to award him custody of the two great lordships of Gower and Glamorgan in the southern March, in the king's hands because their heirs were underage. Siward did not keep them long, as Glamorgan was recalled and handed on to Earl Gilbert Marshal. In the months he held it however Siward was able to use his position to gain possession of the large lordship of Llanbleddian with its castle of Tal-y-van. After Earl Richard de Clare reclaimed Glamorgan from Earl Gilbert Marshal in 1240, despite not yet being of age, he determined to oust Siward from his lordship. In 1244 Siward was conducting hostilities against a Welsh neighbour Hywel ap Maredydd lord of Meisgyn, in the course of which one of the earl's household was taken by the Welsh. When Earl Richard intervened, ordering Siward to release Welsh hostages he had taken, the two men argued, and Siward compounded his offences by conspiring with Hywel in the pillaging of the earl's lands. In July 1245 Siward consented to meet the earl at a session of the Glamorgan county court held on Stalling Down, near the town of Cowbridge. But once there he was cornered and charged with sedition, and promptly offered a trial by battle with the earl's household knight Stephen Bauzan. He refused and demanded an adjournment, but no one present would offer pledges that he would return to meet the charges, and so the earl took hostages and seized Siward's goods. When Siward would not appear at subsequent courts he was outlawed and all his possessions in Glamorgan confiscated. For good measure the earl did the same to Hywel ap Maredudd, and so acquired two of the biggest lordships in Glamorgan by sharp practice, as Siward's attorneys later argued before the king's justices sent into Wales to investigate, in a case which was still going on in the months before his death, which occurred in November or December 1248, by a stroke, according to the historian Matthew Paris.

== Family ==
Richard had at least one brother, William Siward, who also found a place in the household of Earl William Marshal the younger and whose soul was commemorated in a grant by the earl to All Saints priory in Dublin. Richard also had a nephew called Thomas, who was a landowner in Leinster. Richard had a son called Daniel to whom he granted an estate at Merthyr Mawr in his Glamorgan lordship after 1233, and who was presumably illegitimate. He had a legitimate son and heir Richard with Countess Philippa. He took the boy to Scotland with him after the divorce, and he was brought up at the Scottish royal court, becoming lord of Kellie.
