= Château de Tardes =

Converted castle in Gironde, France

- Maison de Tardes
- Saint-Macaire (Gironde) in France
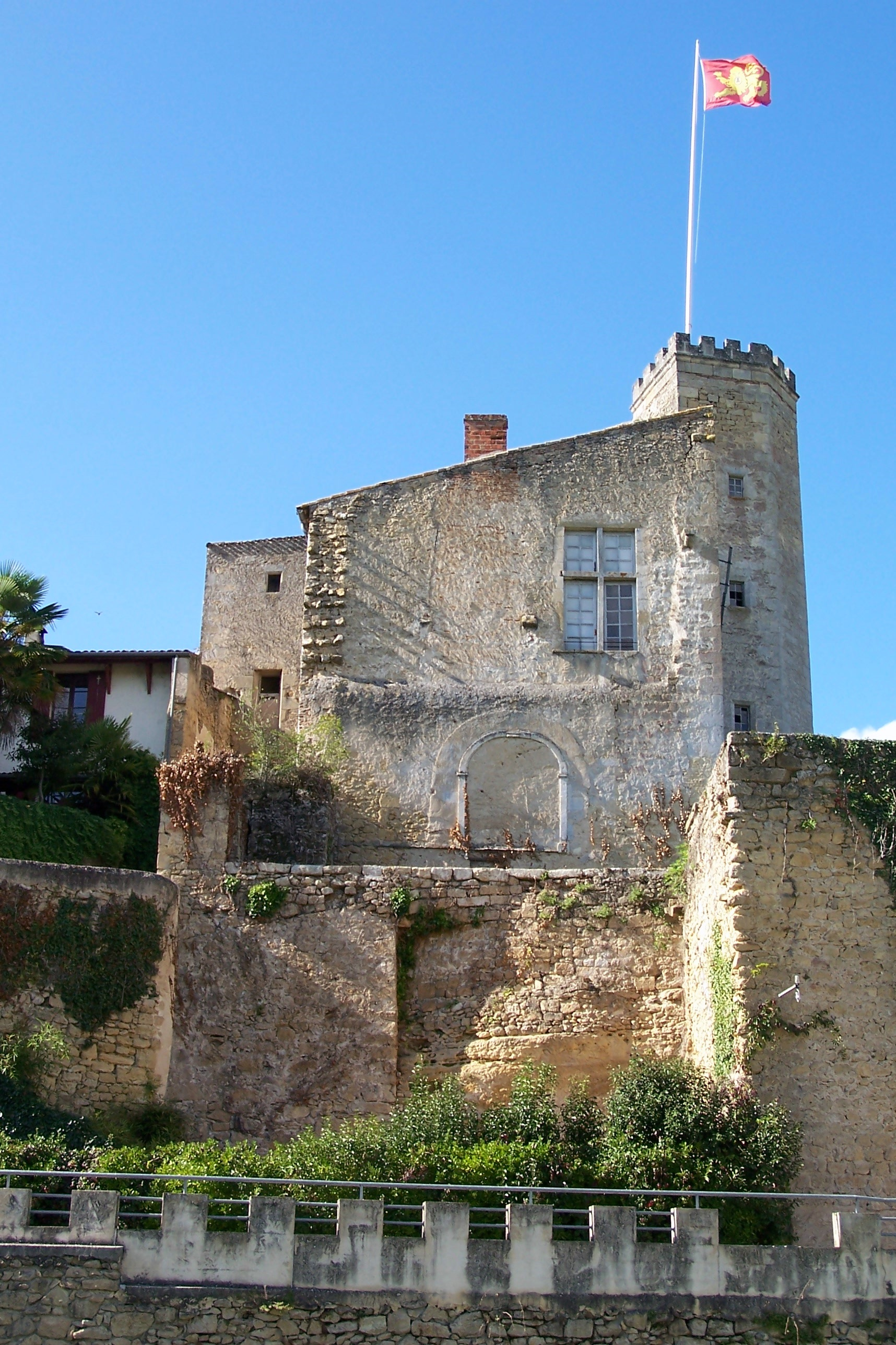

Location
- Coordinates: 44°33′52″N 0°13′29″W

The Château de Tardes is a converted castle in the commune of Saint-Macaire in the Gironde département of France.

It was built between the 13th and 14th centuries as a medieval stronghold, but was converted in the 16th century to a Renaissance-style mansion, with the addition of mullions and a troubadour-style hexagonal tower with a spiral staircase.

The building is not open to the public. It was classified as a monument historique for its tower and well by the French Ministry of Culture on 21 October 1997.

== Gallery ==
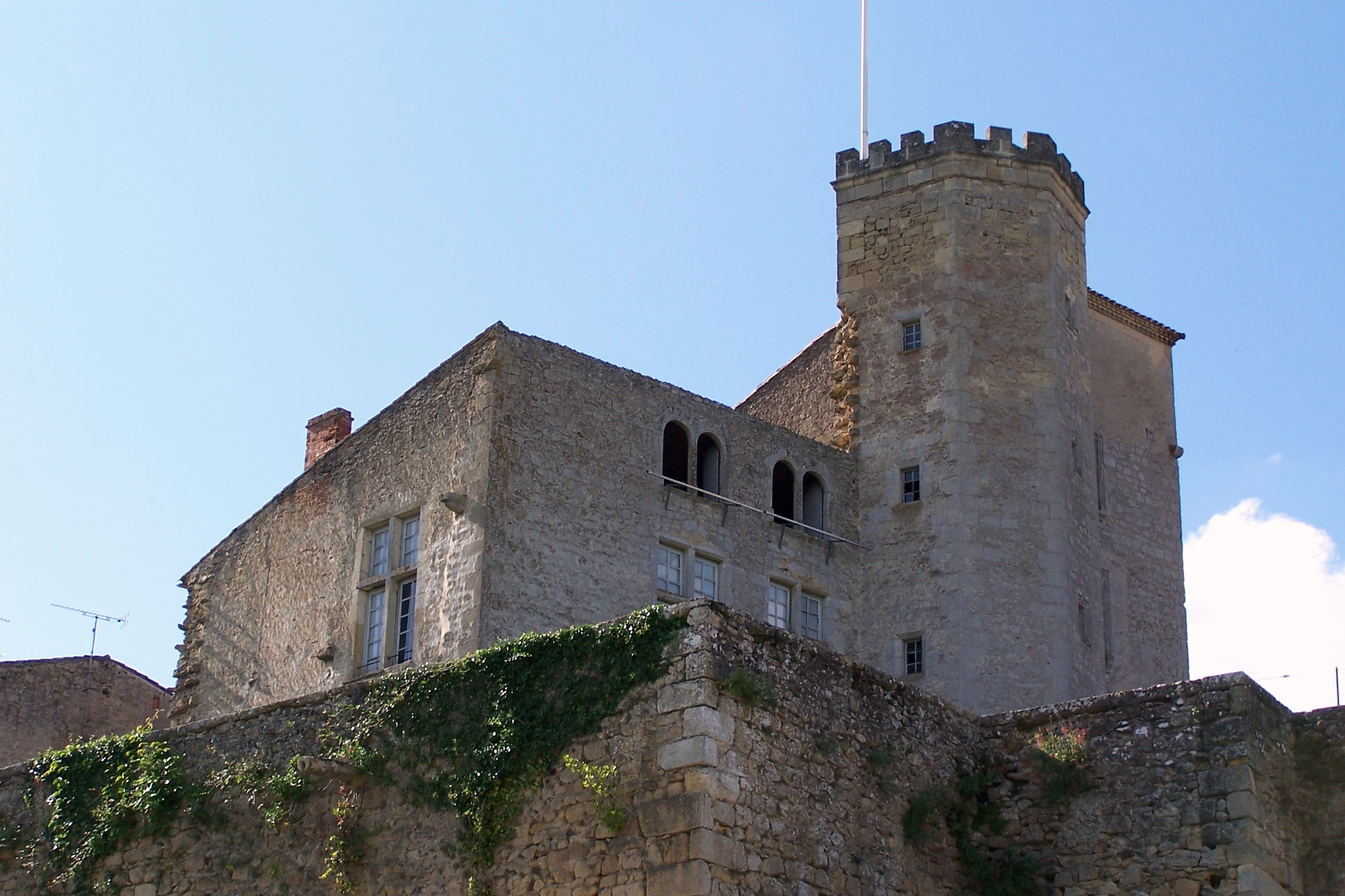
Southwest view (Sept. 2011)

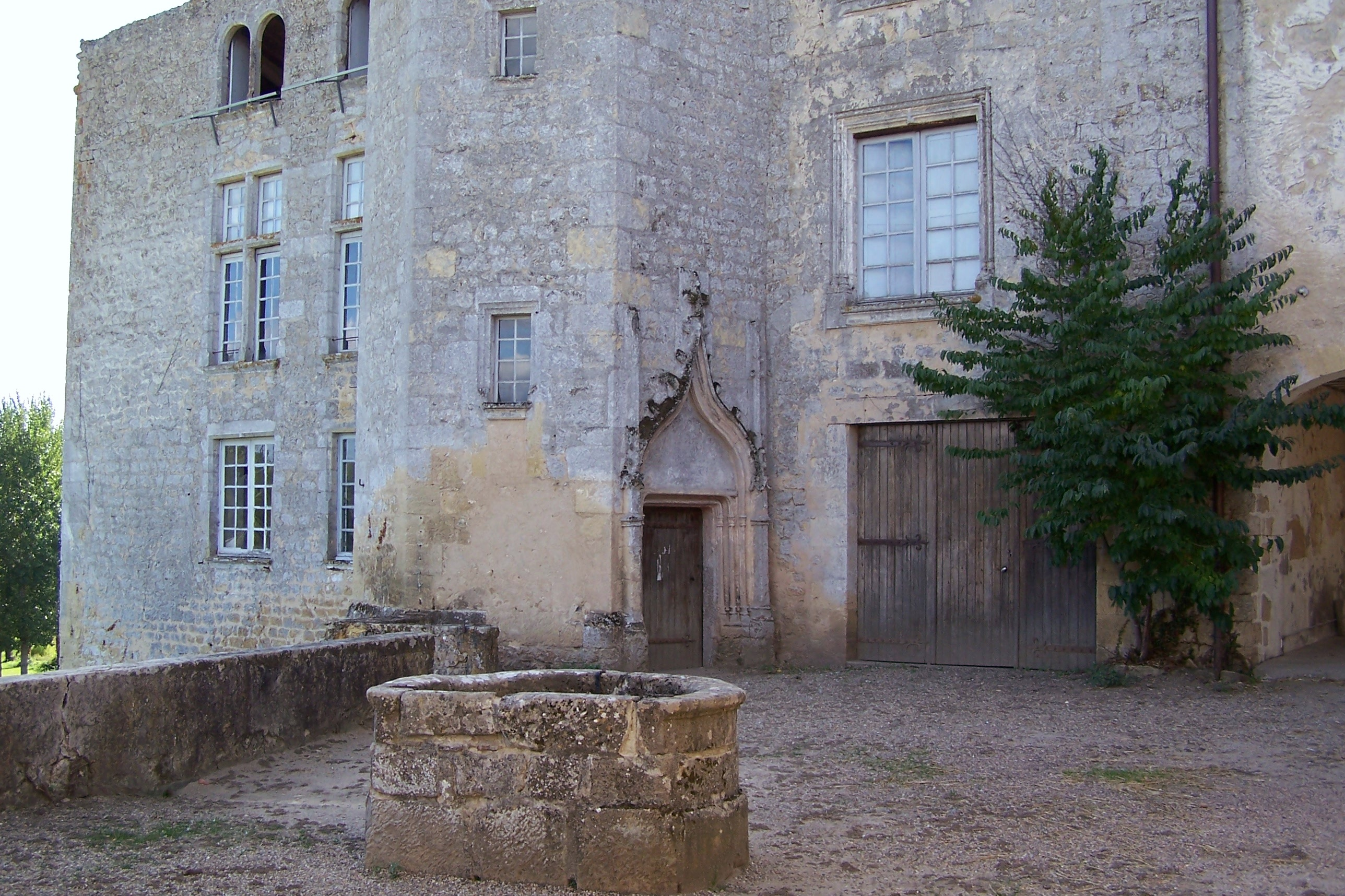
Interior courtyard (Sept. 2011)

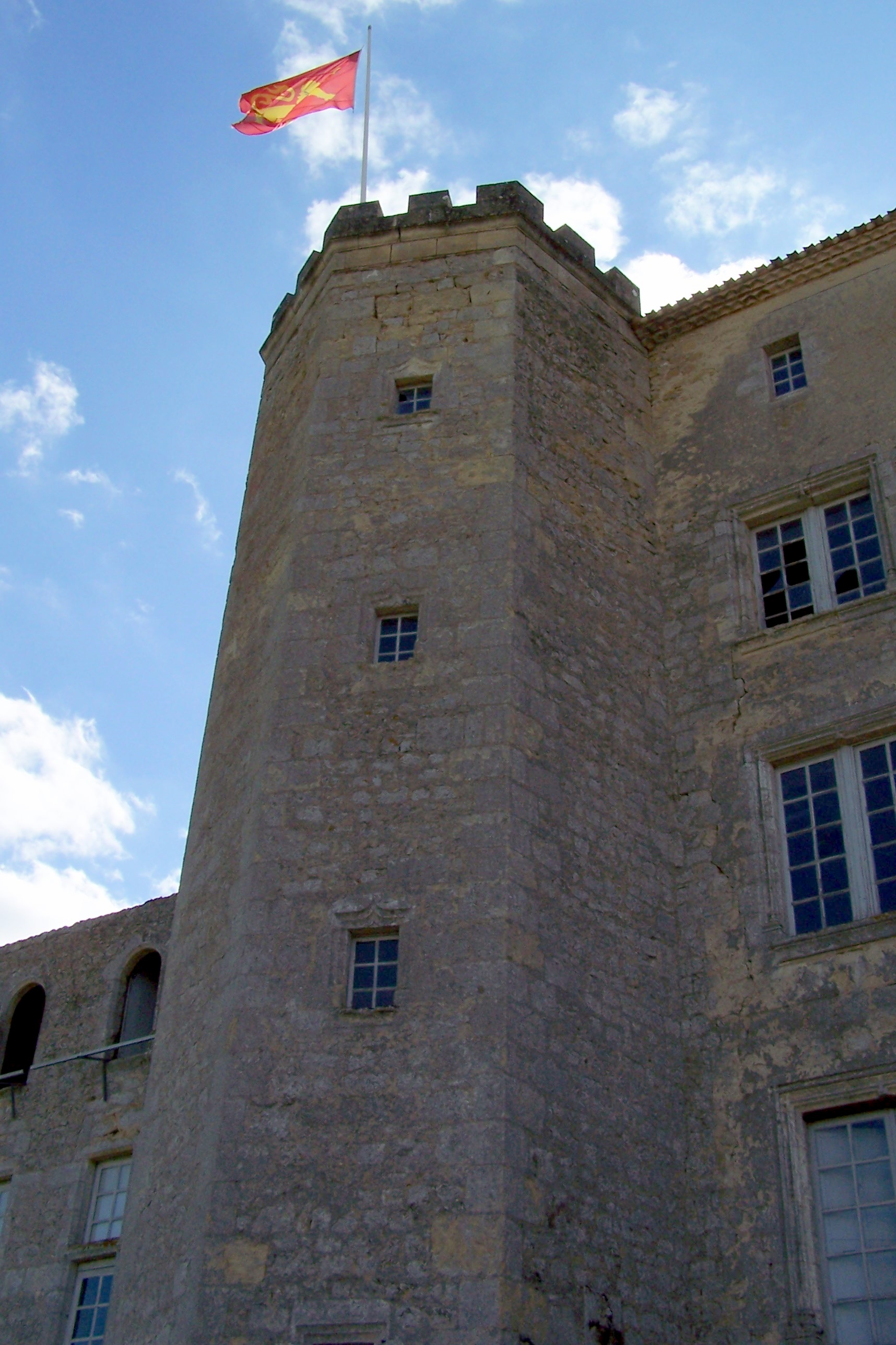
View of the tower from the courtyard (Sept. 2011)

== See also ==
- List of castles in France
