= English invasion of France (1230) =

Military campaign

English invasion of France of 1230
- Part of the Capetian–Plantagenet rivalry
| Date | 30 April – 27 October 1230 |
| Location | France |
| Result | English withdrawal |
| Territorial changes | Oléron reconquered by English |

Belligerents
| France | England |

The English invasion of France of 1230 was a military campaign undertaken by Henry III of England in an attempt to reclaim his family rights and inheritance to the territories of France, held prior to 1224. The English army did not seek battle with the French, did not invade the Duchy of Normandy and marched south to the County of Poitou. By autumn, Henry was ill and running out of money. He retreated to Brittany and sailed back to England, leaving behind a token force. The only lasting gain of the invasion was the island of Oléron, which had been lost in 1224. The failure of the campaign led to the dismissal of Hubert de Burgh, 1st Earl of Kent as Justiciar. According to one historian, "The campaign, arguably the last opportunity to recover Normandy, was a costly fiasco."

== Prelude ==
The fate of Henry's family lands in France still remained uncertain. Reclaiming these lands was extremely important to Henry, who used terms such as "reclaiming his inheritance", "restoring his rights" and "defending his legal claims" to the territories in diplomatic correspondence. The French kings had an increasing financial, and thus military, advantage over Henry. Even under John, the French Crown had enjoyed a considerable, although not overwhelming, advantage in resources, but since then, the balance had shifted further, with the ordinary annual income of the French kings almost doubling between 1204 and 1221.

Louis VIII died in 1226, leaving his 12-year-old son, Louis IX, to inherit the throne, supported by a regency government. (Note: Louis IX's regency government was headed by his mother, Blanche of Castile, although the title of "regent" was not officially used.) The young French king was in a much weaker position than his father, and faced opposition from many of the French nobility who still maintained their ties to England, leading to a sequence of revolts across the country. Against this background, in late 1228 a group of potential Norman and Angevin rebels called upon Henry to invade and reclaim his inheritance, and Peter de Dreux, Duke of Brittany, openly revolted against Louis and gave homage to Henry.

== Invasion ==
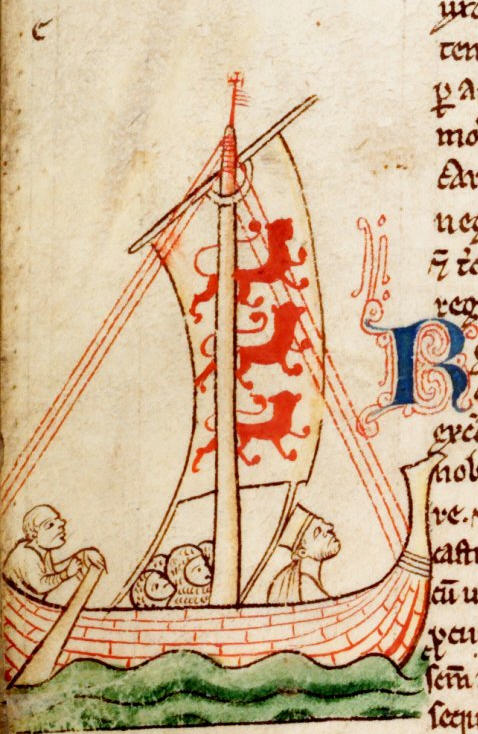
Henry travelling to Brittany in 1230, by Matthew Paris

Henry embarked from Portsmouth with a large force on 30 April 1230, sailing to and staying at Guernsey on 2 May. The next day (3 May) the English army landed at Saint-Malo, where Peter de Dreux, Duke of Brittany met Henry. On 8 May Henry proceeded to Dinan and thence to Nantes, where he hoped to meet his mother Isabella of Angoulême and her new husband Hugh X of Lusignan, Count of La Marche. A French army, marched to Angers in order to shut the English army out from the County of Poitou, and while Henry remained at Nantes waiting for reinforcements, the French army moved to Oudon, a castle about four leagues distant from Nantes. Many of the Breton nobles did homage to Henry, while some fortified their castles against him. The Poitevin lords generally did him homage, Hugh X of Lusignan, Count of La Marche showed some hesitation, and the Guy I, Viscount of Thouars took the side of Louis.

Towards the end of June, the French army was engaged elsewhere, Henry marched through the County of Anjou, taking the castle of Mirebeau late in July, into the County of Poitou and thence into the Duchy of Gascony, where he received the homage of many barons. By autumn, Henry was ill and running out of money. He marched back to Brittany, and after staying for several weeks at Nantes, he returned to England, landing at Portsmouth on 27 October 1230, having left a small force under Peter de Dreux, Duke of Brittany and Ranulf de Blondeville, Earl of Chester, to act against the French in Normandy and Brittany.

Historian H. W. Ridgeway writes, "The campaign, arguably the last opportunity to recover Normandy, was a costly fiasco." The only territory regained by Henry was the island of Oléron (lost in 1224), which was kept by the English until 1294. Normandy was bypassed, reportedly on Hubert de Burgh's advice, despite the fact that the region was ready to revolt in support of Henry. According to historian David Carpenter, many English nobles were not eager to see Normandy reconquered because of the problems over land ownership it would raise. Many of them had received lands in England formerly owned by Normans who had accepted French rule in 1204; upon the reconquest of Normandy, they would have to give up their current lands and return to their estates in Normandy, but it was unclear how this would be realised in practice.
