= Alan Basset =

English baron

Arms of Basset, adopted at start of the age of heraldry, circa 1200–1215: Barry wavy of six or and gules. These arms were born by the Basset family of Umberleigh and Heanton Punchardon in Devon, extinct in the male line in 1802, and continue to be born today by the junior line of that family formerly of Tehidy, Cornwall

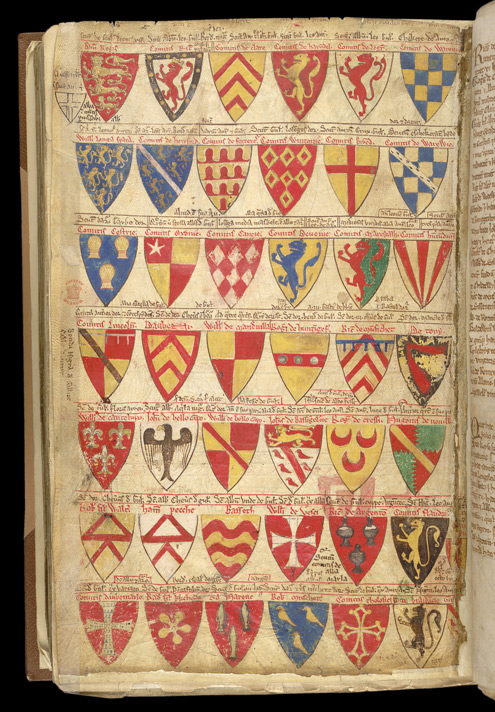
Arms of Basset depicted by Matthew Paris (d.1259) in the Book of Additions, showing heraldic shields of King Henry III and his principal nobles (6th row, 3rd from left "Basseth", with caption above S(cu)t(um) aurum undé de Gul(es) ("A shield of or wavy of gules")

Alan Basset (died 1232 or 1233) was an English baron.

Basset was a younger son of Adeliza and Thomas Basset of Headington, Oxfordshire. In favour with both Richard I and with John, he received from the former the lordships of Woking and Mapledurwell (in Surrey and Hampshire), and from the latter those of Wycombe and Berewick (in Buckinghamshire and Wiltshire).

With his brothers Gilbert and Thomas Adam accompanied John to Northampton, and then to Lincoln where William the Lion, king of Scots did his homage for Northumbria (22 November 1200), which he attested. (Note: The DNB entry cited in the references is incorrect in stating that Basset "accompanied John to Northampton, when the king of Scots did his homage (22 Nov. 1200), which he [at]tested (Rog. Hov. i. 142)". 'Rog. Hov'. is Roger of Howden's Chronica magistri Rogeri de Houedene which covers English history from the Norman Conquest to 1201. The cite 'Rog. Hov. i. 142' should in fact be vol. iv, which on pp. 141–142 states very clearly that the meeting took place outside the city of Lincoln, upon a high hill ("extra civitatem Lincolniae, super montem arduum") and that "Gilleberto Basset, et Thoma et Alano fratribus ejus" were witnesses.)

Basset continued throughout John's reign in close attendance on the court, accompanying the king to Ireland in 1210 and to Runnymede (15 June 1215): his name, with that of his brother Thomas, appearing in Magna Carta among those of the king's counsellors.

At the accession of Henry III, Basset was one of the witnesses to his re-issue of the charter (11 November 1216), and on the royalist reaction, his loyalty was rewarded by his being occasionally employed in the Curia Regis and sent to France on a political mission in 1219–20. He also acted as sheriff of Rutland from 1217 to 1229. Dying in 1232–3, he left three sons: Gilbert, his heir; Fulk, afterwards bishop of London; and Philip, afterwards Justiciar of England.
