= William Malet (Magna Carta baron) =

William Malet (born before 1175–1215), feudal baron of Curry Mallet in Somerset, was one of the guarantors of Magna Carta. In 1190, he accompanied King Richard the Lionheart on third crusade. While still on crusade in 1191, he took part in the Siege of Acre. Upon returning to England, he served as Sheriff of Somerset and Dorset in 1209. The precise nature of his relationship to an earlier William Malet is unknown.

William Malet was one of the rebel barons who were heavily indebted to King John. It is believed that by 1214 he owed the king as much as £1333. In 1214 he entered into an agreement to serve with the king along with 10 knights and 20 other soldiers in exchange for the cancellation of his debts. However, the agreement broke down for an unknown reason and by 1215 he joined the rebellion.

William Malet seems to have died just a few months after Magna Carta was signed by King John.

== Landholdings ==
Amongst the manors comprising his feudal barony were his caput of Curry Mallet, where stood his castle, and Shepton Mallet in Somerset.

== Marriages and progeny ==
He married twice but left no male progeny, only three daughters and co-heiresses, who divided their father's estate.

By his first wife, whose name is unknown, Malet had a daughter.

- Mabel Malet, married firstly Nicholas Avenel and secondly, before November 1223, Hugh de Vivonia (d.1249) (alias de Forz) of Chewton, Somerset.

By his second wife, Alice Basset, who was a daughter of Thomas Basset, Sheriff of Oxfordshire and Berkshire, William Malet had a daughter:

- Bertha Malet (d.pre-1221), who died unmarried.
- Hawise Malet, who at some time before 23 March 1217 married Hugh I Poyntz (d.1220). She married secondly Robert de Mucegros (d.1254) of Brewham, Somerset.
