= Gilbert Basset =

English Baron

- Baron of Wycombe
- Predecessor: Alan Basset
- Successor: Fulk Basset, Bishop of London
- Died: 1241
- Spouse: Isabel de Ferrers of Derby
- Issue: Gilbert Basset
- Father: Alan Basset

Gilbert Basset (died 1241) was an English baronial leader during the reign of King Henry III.

== Early life ==
Basset was the eldest son of Alan Basset, baron of Wycombe. About 1231, he appears to have negotiated a truce with Llewellyn of Wales on behalf of Henry III. Alan Basset appears to have died in 1232, and Gilbert succeeded him in his barony. According to Dugdale, he was made governor of St Briavels Castle and the Forest of Dean. He married Isabel, daughter of William de Ferrers, 5th Earl of Derby and niece to William Marshal, 2nd Earl of Pembroke—a fact which helps to explain his intimate relations with the Earls Marshal.

== Conflict with the King ==
Basset seems at once to have joined the popular party, then headed by Richard, Earl Marshal. When the barons were summoned to Oxford in June 1233 and refused to meet with the king's Poitevin relatives, he took a very prominent part in their councils; so much so that, according to Matthew Paris, Henry's wrath was specially kindled against him. For this conduct, Basset forfeited a certain manor that he had received from King John; when he claimed it back from the king, he was called a traitor and threatened with hanging unless he left the court. At the same time, Richard Siward, Gilbert's nephew by marriage, was seized by the king's orders and held captive—presumably as a hostage for his uncle's conduct.

When, on the advice of Stephen Segrave, Henry summoned Basset and the confederated nobles to meet him at Gloucester in August 1233, and they refused to come, they were promptly outlawed, and orders were given for the destruction of the towns, castles, and parks belonging to them. In retaliation for this, Basset and Siward set fire to Stephen Segrave's villa of Alconbury, though the king himself was then staying at Huntingdon, some four miles distant.

=== Reconciliation ===
After Richard Marshal's death, Henry received both Basset and Siward into his favour and gave them the kiss of peace towards the end of May 1234. At the same time, their estates were restored to them. When, a few days later, Richard Marshal's brother Gilbert was installed as Earl Marshal, the king received Hubert de Burgh, Gilbert Basset, and Richard Siward amongst the number of his most familiar councillors. There does not seem to be any evidence that Gilbert Basset was estranged from the king when Richard Siward was once more banished in 1236; and, indeed, early in the next year, he appears as distinctly on the king's side, when William de Raley demanded an aid from the barons. On this occasion, the rashness of his speech drew a well-merited rebuke from one of the magnates present.

== Other ventures ==
In the same year, Basset's name appears as having taken part in a great tournament, held at Lent, of north against south ("Norenses et Australes"). The south won the day, but not before the contest had changed into a real battle. All the influence of the Papal legate Oddone di Monferrato was required to reconcile the contending parties. Four years later, on Easter 1241, Gilbert Basset figures as one of the two chief promoters of a grand tournament of foreigners against Englishmen. This engagement was, however, forbidden to take place by the king's orders.

== Death ==
In the autumn of the same year, Basset met with his death. While he was going out to hunt, his horse tripped on a root and threw its rider, who was taken up in a kind of paralysis ("dissipatis ossibus et nervis dissolutis"), from which he never recovered. Before the end of August, his only son, Gilbert, also died, leaving the Basset estates to devolve upon his brother Fulk. There does not appear to be any authority for Collins's incidental statement that Gilbert Basset was justiciary.
