= Elizabeth Beauchamp, Baroness Bergavenny =

English baroness

Elizabeth Beauchamp Baroness Bergavenny
- Born: 16 September 1415; Hanley Castle, Worcestershire, England
- Died: 18 June 1448 (aged 32)
- Spouse: Edward Neville, 3rd Baron Bergavenny
- Children: George Nevill, 4th Baron Bergavenny
- Parents: Richard Beauchamp, Earl of Worcester (father); Isabel le Despenser (mother)

Elizabeth Beauchamp, Baroness (A)Bergavenny (16 September 1415 – 18 June 1448) was a medieval English noblewoman and heiress. She was born at Hanley Castle, Worcestershire and was the only child of Richard de Beauchamp, Baron Abergavenny and Earl of Worcester, by Isabel, daughter of Thomas le Despenser, Earl of Gloucester. She was therefore the great-great-granddaughter of Edward III.

She inherited her father's estates upon his death in 1422, and succeeded to the title of Lady Bergavenny [E., 1392] on 18 March 1422, suo jure.

She became the first wife of Edward Neville, 3rd Baron Bergavenny (d. 1476) before 18 October 1424. He was a younger son of Ralph de Neville, 1st Earl of Westmorland and Joan Beaufort, Countess of Westmorland, daughter of John of Gaunt and his third wife, Katherine Roët, aka Katherine Swynford. Her husband's brother, George Neville, 1st Baron Latimer, married her step-sister, also named Elizabeth Beauchamp, daughter of her step-father Richard Beauchamp, 13th Earl of Warwick. Their half-brother and half-sister married their husbands' niece and nephew.

Elizabeth and Edward had five children including George Nevill, 4th Baron Bergavenny. She was buried in Coventry in the graveyard of the Carmelites.

== Ancestry ==
Ancestors of Elizabeth Beauchamp, Baroness Bergavenny

16. Guy de Beauchamp, 10th Earl of Warwick
8. Thomas de Beauchamp, 11th Earl of Warwick
17. Alice de Toeni
4. William de Beauchamp, 1st Baron Bergavenny
18. Roger Mortimer, 1st Earl of March
9. Katherine Mortimer
19. Joan de Geneville, 2nd Baroness Geneville
2. Richard Beauchamp, Earl of Worcester
20. Richard FitzAlan, 10th Earl of Arundel
10. Richard FitzAlan, 11th Earl of Arundel
21. Eleanor of Lancaster
5. Joan FitzAlan
22. William de Bohun, 1st Earl of Northampton
11. Elizabeth de Bohun
23. Elizabeth de Badlesmere
1. Elizabeth Beauchamp, Baroness Abergavenny
24. Edward le Despenser
12. Edward le Despencer, 1st Baron le Despencer
25. Anne Ferrers
6. Thomas le Despenser, Earl of Gloucester
26. Bartholomew de Burghersh, 2nd Baron Burghersh
13. Elizabeth de Burghersh, 3rd Baroness Burghersh
27. Cicely Weyland
3. Isabel le Despenser
28. Edward III of England
14. Edmund of Langley, 1st Duke of York
29. Philippa of Hainault
7. Constance of York
30. Peter of Castile
15. Isabella of Castile
31. María de Padilla
