= Lordship of Glamorgan =

Realm in Glamorgan, Wales

Lordship of Glamorgan Arglwyddiaeth Morgannwg
- 1091–1536
- Arms of Gilbert de Clare

- Wales (1267–1277): Gwynedd, Llywelyn ap Gruffudd's principality Territories conquered by Llywelyn ap Gruffudd Territories of Llywelyn's vassals Lordships of the Marcher barons Lordships of the King of England Kingdom of England
- Status: Client state of the Kingdom of England
- Capital: Cardiff
- Government: Lordship
- Lord
  - 1093–1107: Robert Fitzhamon
  - 1217–1230: Gilbert de Clare
  - 1509–1536: Henry VIII of England
- Historical era: Middle Ages
  - Conquered by Robert Fitzhamon: 1091
  - Annexation by Henry VIII: 1536
Preceded by	Succeeded by
Kingdom of Glywysing	Kingdom of England

The Lordship of Glamorgan (Welsh: Arglwyddiaeth Morgannwg) was one of the most powerful and wealthy of the Welsh Marcher Lordships. The seat was Cardiff Castle. It was established by the conquest of Glamorgan from its native Welsh ruler, by the Anglo-Norman nobleman Robert FitzHamon, feudal baron of Gloucester, and his legendary followers the Twelve Knights of Glamorgan. The Anglo-Norman Lord of Glamorgan, like all Marcher lords, ruled his lands directly by his own law: thus he could, amongst other things, declare war, raise taxes, establish courts and markets and build castles as he wished, without reference to the English Crown. These privileges were only lost under the Laws in Wales Acts 1535–1542. Though possessing many castles, the main seat of the Lordship was Cardiff Castle.

== First Creation ==
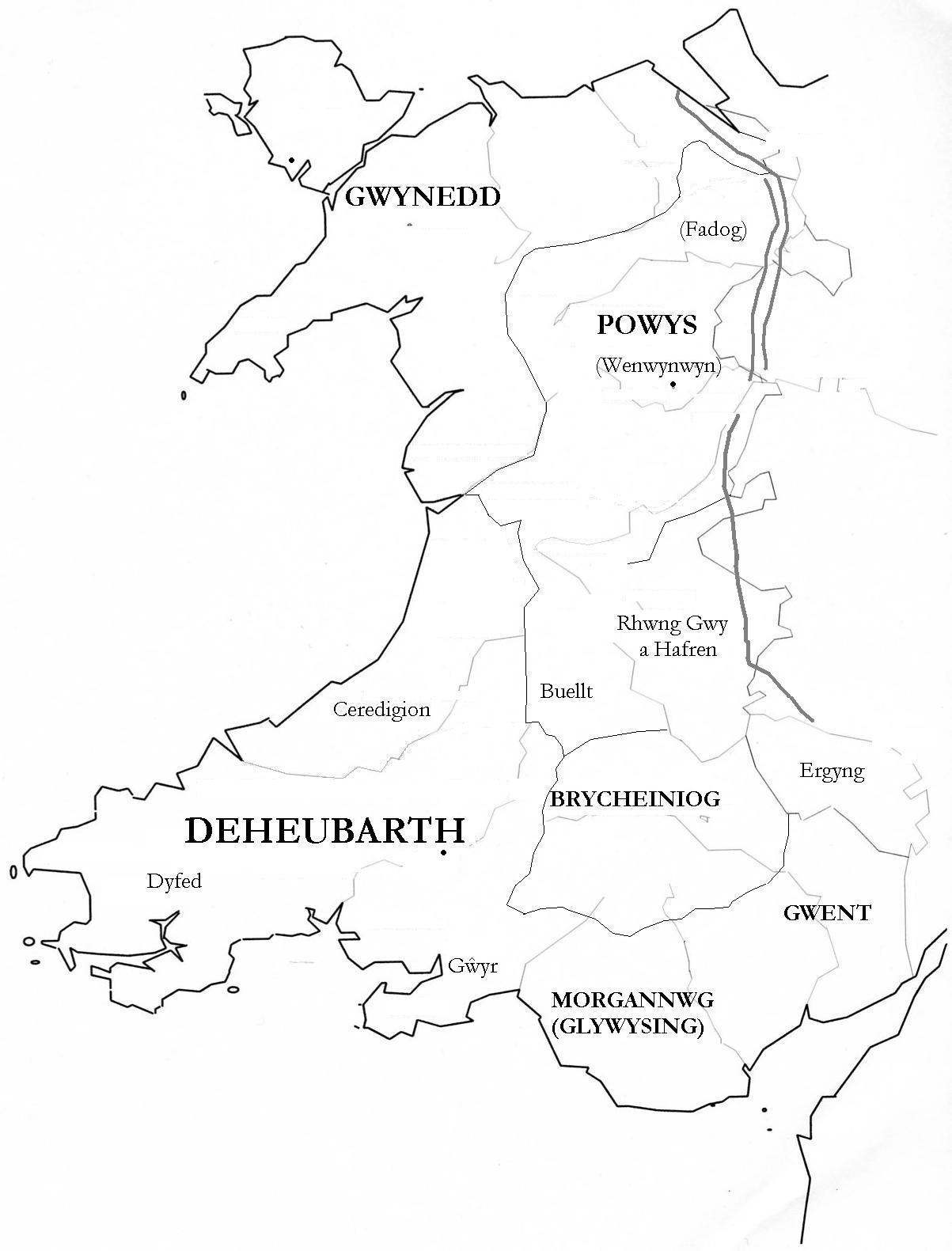

- Robert Fitzhamon, the conqueror of Glamorgan (1093–1107)
- Robert, 1st Earl of Gloucester (1118–1147)
- William Fitz Robert, 2nd Earl of Gloucester (1147–1183)
- Isabel, Countess of Gloucester (d. 1217) with:
  - John of England (1189–1214), however marriage annulled
  - Geoffrey FitzGeoffrey de Mandeville, 2nd Earl of Essex (after 1214–1217)

== Second Creation ==
- Gilbert de Clare, 4th Earl of Hertford, 5th Earl of Gloucester (1217–1230)
- Richard de Clare, 5th Earl of Hertford, 6th Earl of Gloucester (1230–1262)
- Gilbert de Clare, 6th Earl of Hertford, 7th Earl of Gloucester (1262–1295)
- Ralph de Monthermer, 1st Baron Monthermer (1297–1307) through marriage to Joan, the widow of the 6th Earl. Ceased on her death in 1307.
- Gilbert de Clare, 7th Earl of Hertford, 8th Earl of Gloucester (1307–1314)
- Eleanor de Clare, suo jure 6th Lady of Glamorgan, 2nd Baroness le Despenser (1314–1337)
  - Sir Hugh "the younger" le Despenser, 2nd Baron le Despenser and Eleanor his wife (1314–1326)
  - William la Zouche, 1st Baron Zouche and Eleanor his wife (1329–1337)

== Third Creation ==
- Sir Hugh le Despencer, 3rd Baron le Despencer (1338–1349)
- Edward le Despenser, 4th Baron le Despenser (1349–1375)
- Thomas le Despencer, 1st Earl of Gloucester (1375–1400)
- Richard le Despenser, 4th Baron Burghersh (c. 1400–1411)
- Isabel le Despenser (1422–1423)
  - Richard Beauchamp, 1st Earl of Worcester (1411–1422) and Isabel le Despenser
  - Richard de Beauchamp, 13th Earl of Warwick (1423–1439) and Isabel le Despenser

== Fourth Creation ==
- Henry de Beauchamp, 1st Duke of Warwick (1439–1445)

== Fifth Creation ==
- Richard Neville, 16th Earl of Warwick (1449–1471) and Anne Beauchamp, 16th Countess of Warwick
- Isabella Neville and George Plantagenet, 1st Duke of Clarence (1471–1478)
- Richard III of England (1478–1485) and Anne Neville

== Sixth Creation ==
- Jasper Tudor, Duke of Bedford (1485–1495)

== Merged with English Crown ==
- Henry VII of England (1495–1509)
- Henry VIII of England (1509–1547)
