= Despencer =

Despencer (le Despencer) or Despenser is an title/status surname referring to the medieval court office of steward, most commonly associated with Norman-English barons of the 13th- and 14th-centuries and their descendants. Notable people with this surname include:

- Edward le Despenser (1310–1342), soldier, father of Edward le Despenser, 1st Baron le Despencer
- Edward le Despencer, 1st Baron le Despencer (1335–1375), the son of Edward le Despencer
- Elizabeth le Despencer, Baroness le Despencer (1342–1402), English noblewoman born to Bartholomew de Burghersh
- Francis Dashwood, 11th Baron le Despencer (1708–1781), English rake, politician, Chancellor of the Exchequer, founder of the Hellfire Club
- Henry le Despencer (c. 1341–1406), Bishop of Norwich, the younger brother of Edward le Despencer
- Sir Hugh le Despencer (justiciar), Baron le Despencer (1223–1265) son of sheriff Hugh and an important ally of Simon de Montfort during the reign of Henry III. He served briefly as Justiciar of England in 1260 and as Constable of the Tower of London and the castles of Shrewsbury, Bruges, and Bolsover.
- Hugh le Despenser (sheriff) (died 1238) was a wealthy land owner in the East Midlands of England, as well as High Sheriff of Berkshire
- Hugh le Despenser the Elder, 1st Earl of Winchester (1262–1326), for a time the chief adviser to King Edward II of England
- Hugh le Despenser the Younger (1286–1326) became Royal Chamberlain in 1318 and the favourite of Edward II of England but developed a reputation for greed and, after falling out with the Barons, was accused of treason. He was forced into exile in 1321 with his father, who later fled to Bordeaux. Hugh was captured and sentenced to public execution by hanging (for thievery), and drawing and quartering (for treason).
- Hugh le Despencer, Baron le Despencer (1338) (1308–1349), the eldest son and heir of Hugh Despenser the Younger, fought at the battles of Sluys and Crécy. He was created a baron by writ of summons to Parliament in 1338 (the titles of his father and grandfather having been forfeited by virtue of their treason convictions).
- Isabel le Despenser, Countess of Arundel (1312–1356), married, as his 1st wife, Richard Fitzalan, 10th Earl of Arundel. The marriage was annulled and their child, Edmund, was disinherited.
- James Despencer-Robertson OBE (1886–1942) a Conservative Party politician in the United Kingdom
- Richard le Despenser, 4th Baron Burghersh (1396–1414) was the son and heir of Thomas le Despenser, 1st Earl of Gloucester
- Robert Despenser (d. after 1098), a court official and landholder under William II of England
- Thomas le Despenser, 1st Earl of Gloucester (22 September 1373 – 13 January 1400, Bristol) was the son of Edward le Despenser, 1st Baron le Despencer, whom he succeeded in 1375. He was executed after the abortive Epiphany Rising.

== See also ==
- Baron le Despencer, a title in the English Peerage
