= Countess of Warwick =

The title Countess of Warwick may be given either to a female heir of the Earl of Warwick or to the wife of the Earl of Warwick. The title has been held by several women, including:

== Countesses suo iure ==
- Margaret de Newburg, 7th Countess of Warwick (died 1253)
- Anne de Beauchamp, 15th Countess of Warwick (1443-1448)
- Anne Beauchamp, 16th Countess of Warwick (1426-1492)

== Countesses by marriage ==
- Gundreda de Warenne, Countess of Warwick (died before 1184)
- Matilda de Percy, Countess of Warwick (died 1204)
- Philippa Basset, Countess of Warwick (died 1265)
- Maud FitzJohn, Countess of Warwick (c.1238-1301)
- Alice de Toeni, Countess of Warwick (1284-1325)
- Katherine Mortimer, Countess of Warwick (1314-1369)
- Elizabeth de Berkeley, Countess of Warwick (1386-1422)
- Isabel le Despenser, Countess of Worcester (1400-1439)
- Cecily Neville, Duchess of Warwick (c.1425-1450)
- Jane Dudley, Duchess of Northumberland (1508–1555) (also Countess of Warwick)
- Anne Seymour, Countess of Warwick (1538-1588)
- Anne Russell, Countess of Warwick (1549-1604)
- Mary Rich, Countess of Warwick (1625-1678)
- Charlotte Rich, Countess of Warwick (1680-1731)
- Elizabeth Greville, Countess of Warwick (c.1721-1800)
- Sarah Greville, Countess of Warwick (1786-1851)
- Anne Greville, Countess of Warwick (1829-1903)
- Daisy Greville, Countess of Warwick (1861-1938)
