= Baron Burghersh =

Barony in the Peerage of England

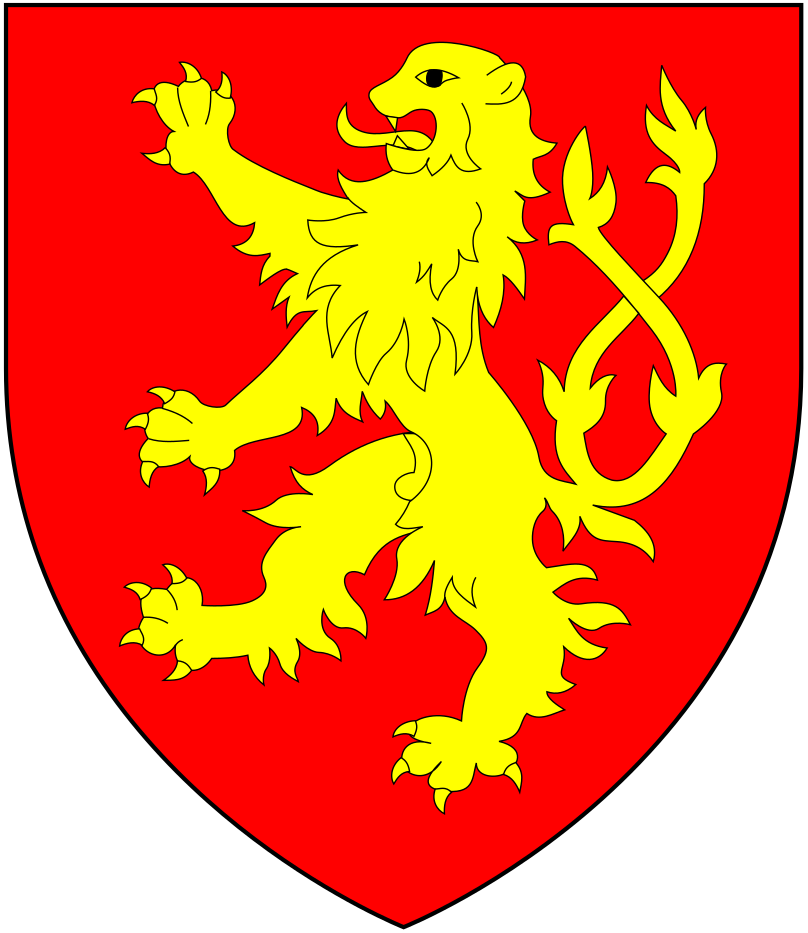
Arms of Burghersh, Baron Burghersh: Gules, a lion rampant, double queued, or

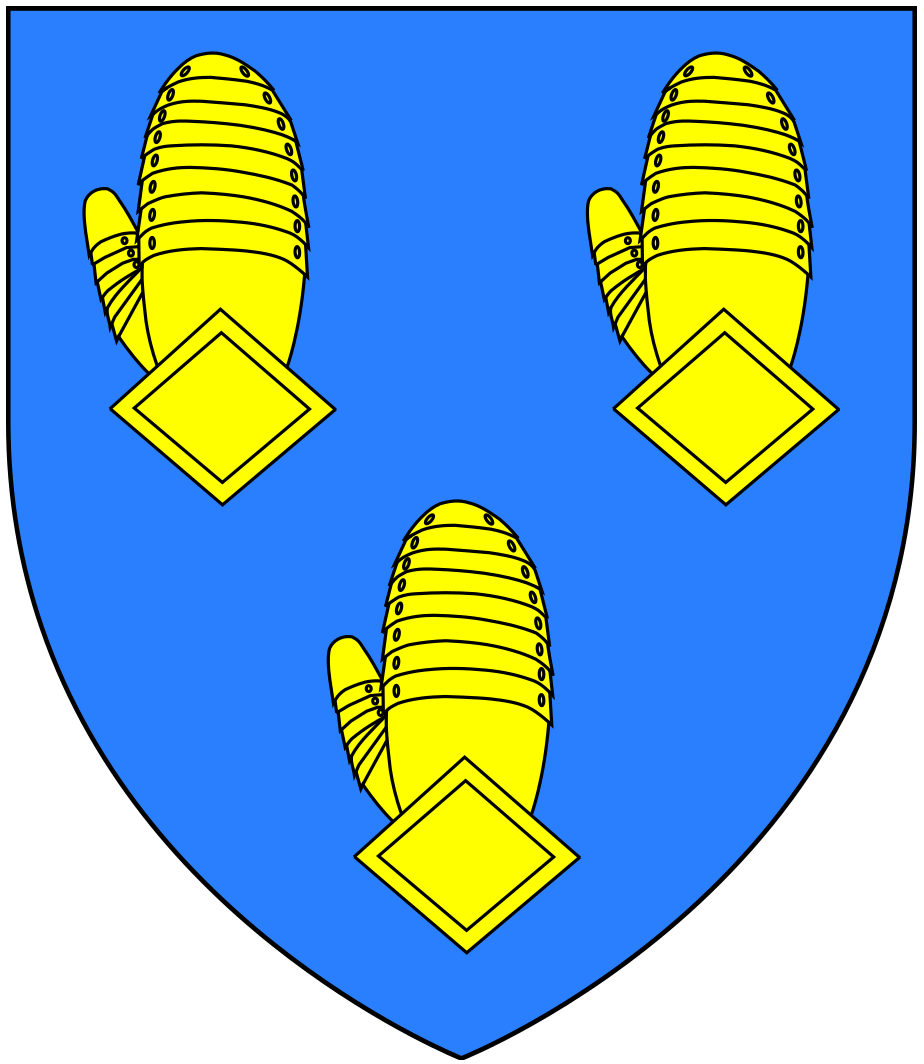
Arms of Fane, Earl of Westmorland and Baron Burghersh: Azure, three dexter gauntlets, backs affronté, or

The title of Baron Burghersh has been created three times in the Peerage of England.

It was first created by writ for Robert de Burghersh on 12 November 1303. Robert had three sons, the eldest of which, named Stephen, became the second Baron. According to modern peerage law, the title would have descended to Maud, Stephen's only daughter, then to her son Sir Walter Paveley, and afterwards to his son, also named Walter. However, there is no evidence that Maud or her descendants ever used the title. After Walter's death the title presumably became abeyant or extinct.

The title was created again by writ for Robert's third son Bartholomew de Burghersh on 25 January 1330. It descended through the families of Despencer and Beauchamp, before becoming abeyant in 1449.

The title was created again on 29 December 1624 for Francis Fane. Francis was made Earl of Westmorland at the same time, and both titles are currently held by Anthony Fane, his descendant.

== Barons Burghersh (1303) ==
- Robert de Burghersh, 1st Baron Burghersh (d. 1306)
- Stephen de Burghersh, de jure 2nd Baron Burghersh (b. c. 1280–1310)
- Maud de Burghersh, de jure et suo jure 3rd Baroness Burghersh (b. 1304)
- Walter Paveley, de jure 4th Baron Burghersh (d. 1375)
- Walter Paveley, de jure 5th Baron Burghersh (testate 1379) (extinct? abeyant?)

== Barons Burghersh (1330) ==
- Bartholomew de Burghersh, 1st Baron Burghersh (bef. 1304–1355)
- Bartholomew de Burghersh, 2nd Baron Burghersh (bef. 1329–1369)
- Elizabeth le Despencer, suo jure 3rd Baroness Burghersh (1342–1409)
- Richard le Despencer, 4th Baron Burghersh (1396–1414)
- Isabel de Beauchamp, suo jure 5th Baroness Burghersh (1400–1439)
- Henry de Beauchamp, 1st Duke of Warwick, 14th Earl of Warwick, 6th Baron Burghersh (1425–1446)
- Anne de Beauchamp, suo jure 15th Countess of Warwick, 7th Baroness Burghersh (1443 or 1434 – 1449)

After Anne's death at the age of five, the Barony of Burghersh fell into abeyance between her aunts. (Her Earldom passed to her aunt Anne Beauchamp, her father Henry's only full sister; her husband Richard Neville then became jure uxoris 16th Earl of Warwick.)

== Barons Burghersh (1624) ==
- Francis Fane, 1st Earl of Westmorland, 1st Lord Burghersh (1580–1629)

See here for further succession.

House of Neville family tree, including Earls of Westmorland, Earls of Abergavenny, Marquesses of Abergavenny, and many creations of the Barons Bergavenny

Geoffrey de Neville	Renata de Bulmer
Robert FitzMaldred c. 1150	Isabel de Neville
Geoffrey FitzRobert de Neville b. c. 1197
Baron Neville of Raby (1st creation by tenure), 1295
Geoffrey de Neville b. c. 1225; 1st Baron Nevill of Raby
Robert de Neville c. 1260/1270; 2nd Baron Nevill of Raby
Baron Neville of Raby (1st creation by writ), 1295
Ralph Neville; 1262–c. 1331; 3rd/1st Baron Neville de Raby
King Edward III; 1312–1377	Ralph Neville c. 1291–1367; 4th/2nd Baron Neville de Raby	Thomas Beauchamp c. 1313–1369; Earl of Warwick
Baron Bergavenny (1st creation), 1392
John of Gaunt; 1340–1377; Duke of Lancaster	John Neville; 5th/3rd Baron Neville de Raby c. 1337–1388	Alexander Neville c. 1340–1392; Archbishop of York	William Beauchamp c. 1343 – 1411; 1st Baron Bergavenny
Earl of Westmorland (1st creation), 1397
King Henry IV; 1367–1413	Joan Beaufort c. 1379–1440	Ralph Neville c. 1364–1425; 1st Earl of Westmorland; 6th/4th Baron Neville de Raby	John Neville c. 1382–1430; 6th Baron Latimer
King Henry V 1386–1422	John Neville c. 1387–1420	Richard Beauchamp c. 1394 – 1421/1422; Earl of Worcester, 2nd Baron Bergavenny
Baron Neville, 1459	Baron Latimer of Snape, 1432	Baron Bergavenny (2nd creation), 1450
Ralph Neville; 1406–1484; 2nd Earl of Westmorland; 7th/5th Baron Neville de Raby	John Neville c. 1410–1461; 1st Baron Neville (1459)	Richard Neville; 1400–1460; Earl of Salisbury	Alice Montacute; 1407–1462; Countess of Salisbury, Baroness Monthermer, 7th/Baroness Montagu	Robert Neville; 1404–1457; Bishop	Cecily Neville; 1415–1495	Richard of York; 1411–1460; Duke of York	William Neville c. 1405–1463; Earl of Kent	George Neville c. 1407–1469; 1st Baron Latimer of Snape	Edward Neville d. 1476; 3rd de facto Baron Bergavenny (1392), 1st Baron Bergavenny (1450)	Elizabeth Beauchamp; 1415–1448; 3rd Baroness Bergavenny de jure suo jure
Barony Neville attained, 1461 reversed, 1472
King Henry VI; 1421–1471	Cecily Neville c. 1425–1450	Richard Neville; 1428–1471; Earl of Warwick	John Neville; 1431–1471; Marquess of Montagu	George Neville; 1432–1476; Archbishop of York	Thomas Neville; 1429–1471; Viscount Fauconberg	Henry Neville of Latimer; 1437–1469
(m1.) Edward of Westminster; 1453–1471; Prince of Wales	King Edward IV; 1442–1483	Ralph Neville c. 1456–1499; 3rd Earl of Westmorland; 8th/6th Baron Neville de Raby; 2nd Baron Neville (1459)	(m2.) Richard III; 1452–1485	Anne Neville; 1456–1485	George Neville; 1461–1483; Duke of Bedford	Isabel Neville; 1451–1476	George Plantagenet; 1449–1478; Duke of Clarence	George Neville c. 1440–1492; 4th de facto Baron Bergavenny (1392), 2nd Baron Bergavenny (1450)
Ralph Neville d. 1498	Edward Plantagenet; 1475–1499; Earl of Warwick	Richard Neville c. 1468–1530; 2nd Baron Latimer of Snape	George Neville c. 1469–1535; 5th de facto Baron Bergavenny (1392), 3rd Baron Bergavenny (1450)	Edward Neville; 1471–1538	Thomas Nevill c. 1484–1542
Ralph Neville; 1498–1549; 4th Earl of Westmorland; 9th/7th Baron Neville de Raby; 3rd Baron Neville (1459)	John Neville; 1493–1543; 3rd Baron Latimer of Snape
Henry Neville; 1525–1569; 5th Earl of Westmorland; 10th/8th Baron Neville de Raby; 4th Baron Neville (1459)	John Neville; 1520–1577; 4th Baron Latimer of Snape	Henry Nevill c. 1527/1535–1587; 6th Baron Bergavenny (1392), 4th Baron Bergavenny (1450)	Edward Nevill c. 1526–1588; 7th de facto Baron Bergavenny (1392)	Henry Neville c. 1520–1593
Barony Latimer of Snape abeyant, 1577
Baron Bergavenny (3rd creation), 1604
Charles Neville; 1542–1601; 6th Earl of Westmorland; 11th/9th Baron Baron Neville de Raby; 5th Baron Neville (1459)'	Mary Nevill; 1554–1626; 7th/5th Baroness Bergavenny; 3rd Baroness le Despenser	Edward Nevill c. 1550–1622; 8th de facto Baron Bergavenny (1392), 1st Baron Bergavenny (1604)	Henry Neville c. 1564–1615
Earldom of Westmorland (1st creation) and subsidiary titles forfeit, 1571
Earl of Westmorland (2nd creation) and Baron Burghersh (3rd creation), 1624
Francis Fane; 1580–1629; 1st Earl of Westmorland, etc., 8th/6th Baron Bergavenny de jure, Baron le Despencer	Henry Nevill c. 1570–1641; 9th de facto Baron Bergavenny, 2nd Baron Bergavenny (1604)	Christopher d. 1649
Inheritance of Barony Bergavenny (3rd creation) unknown, 1641
Baron Bergavenny (4th creation), after 1641–1662
Mildmay Fane; 1602–1666; 2nd Earl of Westmorland, etc.	Francis Fane c. 1611–1681	John Nevill c. 1614–1662; 10th de facto Baron Bergavenny (1392), Baron Bergavenny (4th creation)	George Nevill c. 1615–1666; 11th Baron Bergavenny	Richard Nevill d. 1643
Barony Bergavenny (4th creation) extinct, 1662
Baron Bergavenny (5th creation), after 1666–1695
Francis Fane d. 1691	George Nevill; 1665–1695; 12th de facto Baron Bergavenny (1392), Baron Bergavenny (5th creation)	George Nevill d. 1665
Barony Bergavenny (5th creation) extinct, 1695
Baron Bergavenny (6th creation), 1695
Charles Fane; 1635–1691; 3rd Earl of Westmorland, etc.	Vere Fane; 1645–1693; 4th Earl of Westmorland, etc.	Henry Fane of Brympton; 1669–1726	George Nevill c. 1659–1720/21; 13th de facto Baron Bergavenny (1392), 1st Baron Bergavenny (1695)	Edward Nevill 1664–1701
Vere Fane; 1678–1698; 5th Earl of Westmorland, etc.	Thomas Fane; 1681–1736; 6th Earl of Westmorland, etc.	John Fane; 1686–1762; 7th Earl of Westmorland, etc.
Baron Bergavenny (6th creation) abeyance terminated, 1737	Baron Bergavenny (7th creation), 1724
Thomas Fane; 1701–1771; 8th Earl of Westmorland, etc.	George Nevill; 1702–1723; 14th de facto Baron Bergavenny (1392), 2nd Baron Bergavenny (1695)	Jane Nevill, later Walter; 1703–1786; 4th Baroness Bergavenny (1695)	Edward Nevill c. 1705–1724; 15th de facto Baron Bergavenny (1392), 3rd Baron Bergavenny (1695)	William Nevill d. 1744; 16th de facto Baron Bergavenny (1392), 1st Baron Bergavenny (1724)
Barony Bergavenny (6th creation) abeyant, 1724
Earl of Abergavenny and Viscount Nevill, 1784
John Fane; 1728–1774; 9th Earl of Westmorland, etc.	John Walter d. 1806; 5th Baron Bergavenny (1695)	Charlotte Walter, later Senior c. 1738–1811; 6th Baroness Bergavenny (1695)	George Nevill; 1727–1785; 1st Earl of Abergavenny, etc., 17th de facto Baron Bergavenny (1392), 2nd Baron Bergavenny (1724)	Edward Nevill b. 1729
Barony Bergavenny (6th creation) abeyant, 1811
John Fane; 1759–1841; 10th Earl of Westmorland, etc.	Henry Nevill; 1755–1843; 2nd Earl of Abergavenny, etc., 18th de facto Baron Bergavenny (1392), 3rd Baron Bergavenny (1724)
John Fane; 1784–1859; 11th Earl of Westmorland, etc.	John Nevill; 1789–1845; 3rd Earl of Abergavenny, etc., 19th de facto Baron Bergavenny (1392), 4th Baron Bergavenny (1724)	William Nevill; 1792–1868; 4th Earl of Abergavenny, etc., 20th de facto Baron Bergavenny (1392), 5th Baron Bergavenny (1724)
Marquess of Abergavenny and Earl of Lewes, 1876
Francis William Henry Fane; 1825–1891; 12th Earl of Westmorland, etc.	William Nevill; 1826–1915; 1st Marquess of Abergavenny, etc., 5th Earl of Abergavenny, etc., 21st de facto Baron Bergavenny (1392), 6th Baron Bergavenny (1724)	Caroline Emily Nevill; 1829–1887	Henrietta Augusta Nevill; 1830–1912	Ralph Pelham Nevill; 1832–1914
Anthony Mildmay Julian Fane; 1859–1922; 13th Earl of Westmorland, etc.	Reginald William Bransby Nevill; 1853–1927; 2nd Marquess of Abergavenny, etc., 6th Earl of Abergavenny, etc., 22th de facto Baron Bergavenny (1392), 7th Baron Bergavenny (1724)	Henry Gilbert Ralph Nevill; 1854–1938; 3rd Marquess of Abergavenny, etc., 7th Earl of Abergavenny, etc., 23rd de facto Baron Bergavenny (1392), 8th Baron Bergavenny (1724)	George Montacute Nevill; 1856–1920	William Beauchamp Nevill; 1860–1939	Richard Plantagenet Nevill; 1862–1939	Percy Llewelyn Nevill; 1877–1927
Barony Bergavenny (6th and 7th creations) abeyant, 1938
Vere Anthony Francis Fane; 1893–1948; 14th Earl of Westmorland, etc.	Guy Temple Montacute Larnach-Nevill; 1883–1954; 4th Marquess of Abergavenny, etc., 8th Earl of Abergavenny, etc.
David Anthony Thomas Fane; 1924–1993; 15th Earl of Westmorland, etc.	John Henry Guy Nevill; 1914–2000; 5th Marquess of Abergavenny, etc., 9th Earl of Abergavenny, etc.	Rupert Charles Montecute Nevill; 1923–1982	Michael George Ralph Nevill; 1917–1943
Anthony David Francis Henry Fane b. 1951; 16th Earl of Westmorland, etc.	Harry St. Clair Fane; 1953–2023 styled Lord Burghersh	Christopher George Charles Nevill b. 1955; 6th Marquess of Abergavenny, etc., 10th Earl of Abergavenny, etc.	David Michael Ralph Nevill; 1941-2025	Michael George Rathmore Nevill b. 1943
Daisy Caroline Fane b. 1989	Sam Michael David Fane b. 1989	Guy Michael Rossmore Nevill b. 1973
Heir presumptive to the Earldom of Westmorland	Heir presumptive to the Earldom of Abergavenny
George David Roland Nevill b. 2010	Frederick Guy James Nevill b. 2012	Ralph William James Nevill b. 2015
