= Walter Paveley =

English knight (1319–1375)

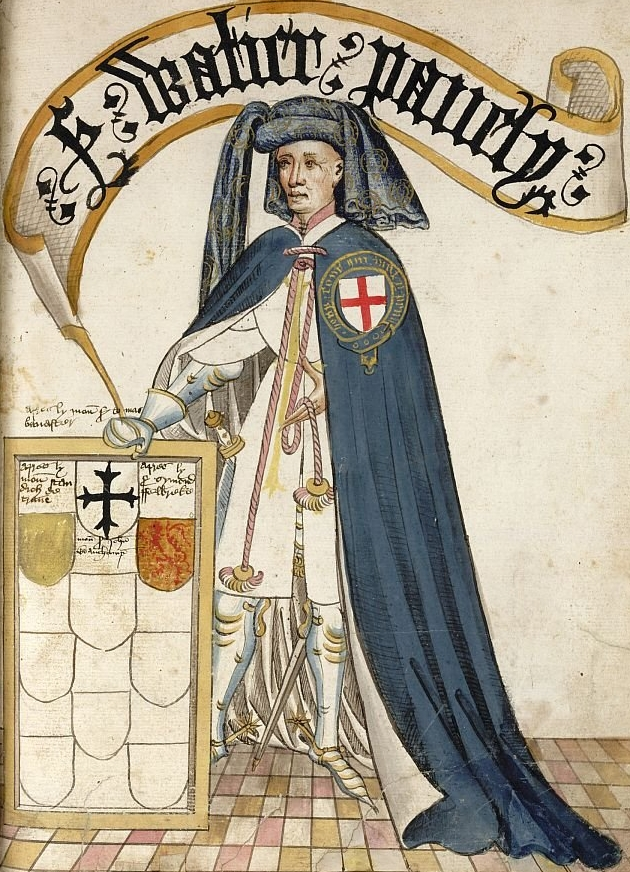
Sir Walter Paveley, KG, illuminated miniature from the Bruges Garter Book made c.1430 by William Bruges (1375–1450), first Garter King of Arms. Unlike most of the illustrations of his fellow knights his arms are not shown on his tabard. The arms shown on the tablet are those of successor Knights in his stall

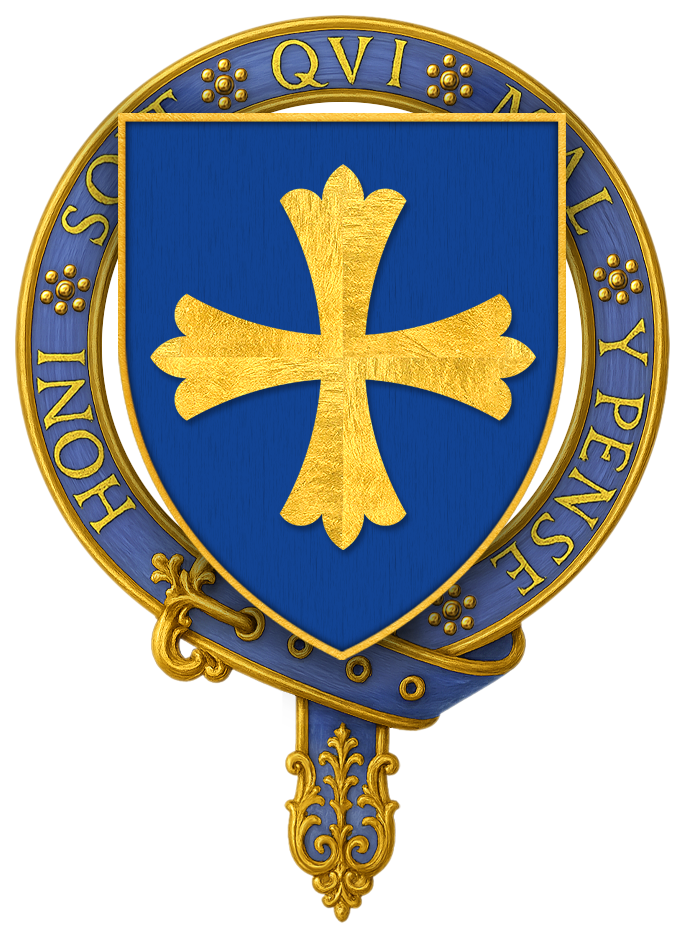
Arms of Sir Walter Paveley, KG: Azure, a cross patonce or. These arms are shown on his surviving Garter stall plate in St George's Chapel Windsor Castle, in the thirteenth stall on the "Prince's side"

Sir Walter Paveley KG (1319–1375) was an English knight from Kent, a Knight Founder of the Order of the Garter. He was the son of Sir Walter Paveley (d. 1327), a Kentish landholder, and Maud (1304 – c. 1366), daughter and heir of Sir Stephen Burghersh (d. 1310), the elder son of Robert Burghersh (d. 1306).

Paveley often served in retinues of Bartholomew Burghersh the elder and Sir Bartholomew Burghersh the younger. He first fought in King Edward III's expedition of 1338–1339 to the Low Countries. Then Paveley participated in War of the Breton Succession during two separate campaigns, 1342–43 and 1345, including the siege of Rennes by Walter de Manny. Paveley fought in France almost every year up until the treaty of Brétigny (1360), most notably joining Henry Lancaster's expedition to Normandy (1346), King Edward's campaign in Northern France, Cressy and Calais (1346–47), the Great Raid of 1355 with Edward the Black Prince in Aquitaine and Languedoc and the battle of Poitiers (1356).

While Paveley was, most certainly, the retainer of Barons Burghersh, he appears to have attracted the personal attention of the Black Prince. In addition to employing Paveley in military campaigns, Prince Edward had given the knight a number of presents and minor grants.

== Sources ==
- George Frederick Beltz, "Memorials of the most noble order of the Garter" (1841);
- Richard Gorski, 'Paveley, Sir Walter (1319–1375)’, Oxford Dictionary of National Biography, OUP, (2004);
- Kingsford, Charles Lethbridge, Dictionary of National Biography, 1885–1900, Volume 44, Paveley, Walter
