= Bartholomew de Burghersh =

Bartholomew de Burghersh may refer to:

- Bartholomew de Burghersh, 1st Baron Burghersh (died 1355), English nobleman and official
- Bartholomew de Burghersh, 2nd Baron Burghersh (died 1369), son of the above, English nobleman and soldier and Knight of the Garter
