= Anne de Beauchamp =

Anne de Beauchamp may refer to:

- Anne de Beauchamp, 15th Countess of Warwick, daughter of Henry de Beauchamp, 1st Duke of Warwick, suo jure Countess of Warwick
- Anne Neville, 16th Countess of Warwick, née Anne de Beauchamp, aunt of the above, wife of Richard Neville, 16th Earl of Warwick
