= Henry Beauchamp, Duke of Warwick =

15th-century English noble

Henry Beauchamp
- Duke of Warwick
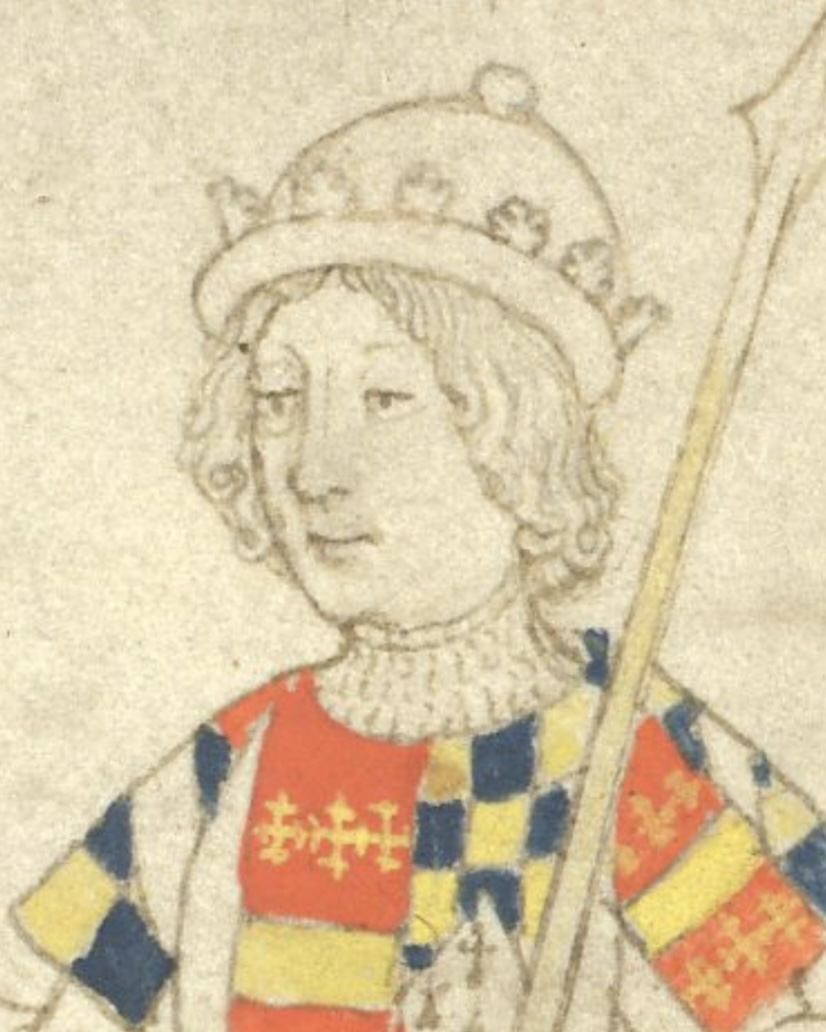
- Drawing of Henry from the Rous Roll, c. 1483
- Tenure: 14 April 1445 – 11 June 1446
- Other titles: 14th Earl of Warwick
- Born: 22 March 1425
- Died: 11 June 1446 (aged 21)
- Residence: Warwick Castle
- Noble family: Beauchamp
- Spouse: Cecily Neville
- Issue: Anne Beauchamp, 15th Countess of Warwick
- Parents: Richard Beauchamp, 13th Earl of Warwick; Isabel le Despenser, Countess of Worcester and Warwick

Henry Beauchamp (22 March 1425 – 11 June 1446), 14th Earl and 1st Duke of Warwick, was an English nobleman.

== Life ==
Henry was the son of Richard Beauchamp, 13th Earl of Warwick, and Isabel le Despenser. In 1434, he married Cecily Neville, the second daughter of Richard Neville, 5th Earl of Salisbury, and Alice Montagu, Countess of Salisbury. He became 14th Earl of Warwick on his father's death in 1439.

His boyhood friendship with King Henry VI and his father's military services placed him high in the King's favour, and he was loaded with titles. In 1444, he was made premier Earl of the realm, and on 14 April 1445, was created Duke of Warwick, and around the same time, granted the Forest of Feckenham.

He is said to have been crowned King of the Isle of Wight in 1444 by Henry VI, to place his playmate on a more equal standing with him, but this story is considered unhistorical.

As Duke of Warwick, he was preceded only by the Duke of Norfolk. This precedence was disputed by the Duke of Buckingham, whom it displaced. However, the issue was rendered moot by his death on 11 June 1446, at which time the dukedom expired for lack of heirs male.

== Succession ==
On his death, the earldom was inherited by his two-year-old daughter, Anne (14 February 1444 – 3 June 1449), suo jure Countess of Warwick. She, however, died three years later, and there was some question regarding who, if any, of her father's sisters (or their heirs) should succeed.

In the end, his full sister Anne (who was married to Richard Neville, eldest son of Richard Neville, Earl of Salisbury, and brother to Beauchamp's widow) was declared the heir, due to the English common law principle that "possession by the brother makes the sister the heir", which denies relatives of the half-blood from inheriting when full-blood relatives are available to inherit. The three half-sisters from their father's first marriage contested this decision, but to no avail.

== Ancestry ==
Ancestors of Henry Beauchamp, Duke of Warwick

8. Thomas de Beauchamp, 11th Earl of Warwick
4. Thomas de Beauchamp, 12th Earl of Warwick
9. Katherine Mortimer
2. Richard de Beauchamp, 13th Earl of Warwick
10. William Ferrers, 3rd Baron Ferrers of Groby
5. Margaret Ferrers
11. Margaret Ufford
1. Henry Beauchamp, Duke of Warwick
12. Edward le Despenser, 1st Baron le Despencer
6. Thomas le Despenser, 1st Earl of Gloucester
13. Elizabeth de Burghersh
3. Isabel le Despenser, Countess of Worcester and Warwick
14. Edmund of Langley, 1st Duke of York
7. Constance of York
15. Infanta Isabella of Castile

Peerage of England
New creation	Duke of Warwick; 1445–1446	Extinct
Preceded by Richard de Beauchamp	Earl of Warwick; 1439–1446	Succeeded by Anne Beauchamp
