= Richard Despenser, 4th Baron Burghersh =

Richard Despenser
- Arms of Despencer

Baron Burghersh
- Reign: August 1402-1414
- Predecessor: Elizabeth de Burghersh
- Successor: Isabel Despenser, Countess of Warwick
- Born: 30 November 1396
- Died: 7 October 1414 (aged 17); Merton, Surrey, England
- Buried: Tewkesbury Abbey
- Noble family: le Despenser
- Spouse: Eleanor Neville
- Father: Thomas Despenser, 1st Earl of Gloucester
- Mother: Constance of York, Countess of Gloucester

Richard le Despenser, 4th Baron Burghersh, K.B (30 November 1396 – 7 October 1414) was the son and heir of Thomas le Despenser, 1st Earl of Gloucester (1373–1400), by Constance of York.

Constance was a daughter of Edmund of Langley, Duke of York, fourth surviving son of Edward III of England, and Isabella of Castile, a daughter of Peter of Castile. His ancestry and marriage placed him in influential circles of the English nobility and he was appointed Knight, Order of the Bath, on 8 April 1413.

== Life ==
Richard married his second cousin Lady Eleanor Neville (a granddaughter of John of Gaunt, Duke of Lancaster (a brother of Edmund of Langley) and Katherine Swynford.) He died when he was just 17, on 7 October 1414, without leaving issue.

His heir was his younger sister Isabel, who married successively Earl of Worcester, and then his cousin, Richard de Beauchamp, 13th Earl of Warwick. His widow Eleanor, Lady Burghersh remarried to Henry Percy, 2nd Earl of Northumberland.

== Ancestry ==
Ancestors of Richard Despenser, 4th Baron Burghersh

16. Hugh Despenser the younger
8. Edward le Despenser
17. Eleanor de Clare
4. Edward le Despencer, 1st Baron le Despencer
18. William Ferrers, 1st Baron Ferrers of Groby
9. Anne Ferrers
19. Ellen de Menteith
2. Thomas le Despenser, 1st Earl of Gloucester
20. Bartholomew Burghersh, 1st Lord Burghersh
10. Bartholomew de Burghersh, 2nd Baron Burghersh
21. Elizabeth de Verdun
5. Elizabeth de Burghersh
22. Richard of Weyland
11. Cicely Weyland
23. Joan de Ufford
1. Richard le Despenser, 4th Baron Burghersh
24. Edward II of England
12. Edward III of England
25. Isabella of France
6. Edmund of Langley, 1st Duke of York
26. William I, Count of Hainault
13. Philippa of Hainault
27. Joan of Valois
3. Constance of York
28. Alfonso XI of Castile
14. Peter of Castile
29. Maria of Portugal
7. Isabella of Castile
30. Juan García de Padilla, 1st Lord of Villagera
15. María de Padilla
31. María Fernández de Henestrosa
