= Baron le Despencer =

Title in the Peerage of England

Barony of le Despencer
- Arms of Despencer, Barons le Despencer: Quarterly 1st & 4th: Argent; 2nd & 3rd: Gules, a fret or, over all a bend sable
- Creation date: 1264/1295 (abeyant 1449-1604) (first creation); 1314 (second creation); 1338 (third creation); 1357 (fourth creation)
- Peerage: Peerage of England
- First holder: Hugh le Despenser (justiciar) or Hugh le Despenser, 1st/2nd Baron le Despencer
- Extinction date: 1349 (third creation)

Baron le Despencer is a title that has been created several times by writ in the Peerage of England.

== Creation ==
Sir Hugh le Despenser I was a large landowner in Leicestershire, Yorkshire, Lincolnshire, and Rutland. He was appointed High Sheriff of Staffordshire and Shropshire in 1222 and High Sheriff of Berkshire in 1226 and 1238.

The first creation was in 1295, when Hugh the elder Despenser was summoned to the Model Parliament. He was the eldest son of the sometime Justiciar Hugh Despenser (d. 1265), son of Sir Hugh le Despenser I (above). The sometime Justiciar was summoned in 1264 to Simon de Montfort's Parliament and is sometimes considered the first baron. Hugh the younger Despenser, son of Hugh the elder, was also summoned to Parliament in 1314, during his father's lifetime, the second creation of the title. Both elder and younger Despensers were attainted and executed in 1326, extinguishing the two creations.

In 1338, Hugh le Despenser, son of Hugh the younger, was summoned to Parliament, the third creation of the title. He died without issue in 1349, and the title became extinct.

In 1357, this Hugh's nephew, Edward Despenser, 1st Baron Despenser was summoned to Parliament, the fourth creation. His son Thomas inherited the title in 1375. Thomas was created Earl of Gloucester in 1397, and in 1398, the attainders of the elder and younger Despensers were reversed, making him (in modern law) heir to the first and second creations as well. Thomas himself was attainted in 1400 for his part in the Epiphany Rising. Upon the death of Anne de Beauchamp, 15th Countess of Warwick in 1449, claims to his baronies passed into abeyance, so that the reversal of his attainder in 1461 had no immediate effect. In 1604, the first creation of the barony was called out of abeyance for Mary Fane, the first barony by writ of summons to so be revived. When calling it out of abeyance, the House of Lords gave it precedence as if it had been created in 1264. Her successor in the barony was the first Earl of Westmorland, and the next six earls held the barony and the earldom together. At the death of the seventh earl, the barony again fell into abeyance. The abeyance was terminated for Sir Francis Dashwood, but at his death the barony again went into abeyance. Once again, the Sovereign had to terminate the abeyance, and the same was done in favour of Sir Thomas Stapleton, Baronet. The fourteenth baron succeeded to the title of Viscount Falmouth, and the two titles have remained united since.

The fifth creation of the title was made in 1387 for Philip le Despencer, great-grandson of Hugh the elder Despenser. The title became dormant on the death of his son Philip, the second baron, in 1424. One of his heirs was created Baron Wentworth, and the dormant title became abeyant with that barony in 1815, until its termination in 1856.

== Parliament of 1264 ==
The first of the family summoned to Parliament was called in 1264 by the rebel Simon de Montfort. This is generally not held to have created a hereditary barony.

- Hugh Despenser (justiciar) (1223–1265)

== Barons le Despencer, first creation (1295) ==
In 1295, Hugh Despenser was summoned to Parliament. This is held to have created a hereditary barony.

- Hugh Despenser, 1st/2nd Baron le Despencer (1262–1326) (created Earl of Winchester, 1322)(attainted 1326)
- Attainder reversed 1398; see creation of 1357 below

== Barons le Despencer, second creation (1314) ==
In 1314, both Hugh the elder and his son, Hugh the younger, were summoned. This is held by modern usage to have created a novel second barony for the son.

- Hugh Despenser the Younger (1286–1326) (attainted 1326)
- Attainder reversed 1398; see creation of 1357 below

== Barons le Despencer, third creation (1338) ==
Without the attainder of his father or grandfather being reversed, the next generation was summoned in 1338. By modern usage, this is held to have created a new title. Any barony thus created became extinct on his death without issue.

- Hugh le Despenser, Baron le Despenser (1338) 1308–1349

== Barons le Despencer, fourth creation (1357) ==
Again without the reversal of the previous attainders, another descendant was summoned in 1357, by modern usage creating a fourth barony. With the reversal of the attainders of Lord Hugh the elder (first creation) and Lord Hugh the younger (second creation) in 1398, the hereditary right to these earlier baronies vested in the holder of this fourth barony.

- Edward Despenser, 1st Baron Despenser (1336–1375)
- Thomas Despenser, 2nd Baron le Despencer (1373–1400) (created Earl of Gloucester, 1397; beneficiary of the reversal of the attainder of first and second creations in 1398; attainted 1400)

The first, second, and fourth creations lay under attainder from 1400. The attainder was reversed in 1461, but the hereditary right had fallen into abeyance from 1449. This abeyance was settled in 1604 in favor of Mary Fane, with precedence dating from the Parliament of 1264.

== Barons le Despencer (precedence from 1264) ==
When the abeyance of the Barony le Despenser was terminated in 1604, Mary Fane was confirmed with precedence dating from 1264, though modern scholars do not accept that summons to the Parliament of that year created hereditary baronies.

- Mary Fane, 3rd Baroness le Despencer (1554–1626) (abeyance terminated 1604)
- Francis Fane, 1st Earl of Westmorland, 4th Baron le Despencer (1580–1629)
- Mildmay Fane, 2nd Earl of Westmorland, 5th Baron le Despencer (1602–1666)
- Charles Fane, 3rd Earl of Westmorland, 6th Baron le Despencer (1635–1691)
- Vere Fane, 4th Earl of Westmorland, 7th Baron le Despencer (1645–1693)
- Vere Fane, 5th Earl of Westmorland, 8th Baron le Despencer (1678–1699)
- Thomas Fane, 6th Earl of Westmorland, 9th Baron le Despencer (1683–1736)
- John Fane, 7th Earl of Westmorland, 10th Baron le Despencer (1685–1762) (abeyant 1762)
- Francis Dashwood, 11th Baron le Despencer (1708–1781) (abeyance terminated 1763; abeyant 1781)
- Thomas Stapleton, 12th Baron le Despencer (1766–1831) (abeyance terminated 1788) (see Stapleton baronets)
- Mary Frances Elizabeth Boscawen, 13th Baroness le Despencer (née Stapleton) (1822–1891)
- Evelyn Edward Thomas Boscawen, 7th Viscount Falmouth, 14th Baron le Despencer (1847–1918)

See Viscount Falmouth for further Barons le Despencer.

== Barons le Despencer, fifth creation (1387) ==
In 1387, Philip le Despencer was summoned to Parliament, by modern usage held to have created a hereditary title though none of his heirs were again summoned until 1529, when a descendant was called as Baron Wentworth. Any barony thus created would have the same co-heirs as the subsequent Barons Wentworth.

- Philip le Despencer, 1st Baron le Despencer (1342–1401)
- Philip le Despencer, 2nd Baron le Despencer (1365–1424)
- The barony became dormant after his death
- Margery le Despencer (d. 1478)
- Sir Henry Wentworth (c. 1447–1499/1500)
- Sir Richard Wentworth (c. 1458–1528)
- Thomas Wentworth, 1st Baron Wentworth (1501–1551) (created Baron Wentworth in 1529)
- For further heirs, see Baron Wentworth; abeyant 1815.

== Tree ==
Tree of Lords le Despenser

Thomas le Despenser
Hugh le Despenser; High Sheriff of Berkshire died 1238
Hugh le Despenser; Justiciar; Parliament of 1264 † 1265, Evesham
Hugh Despenser; Lord le Despenser (1295) [1st] exiled & deprived 1321/2 restored 1322; Earl of Winchester (1322) executed & attainted 1326 (attainder reversed 1398)
Hugh le Despenser; Lord le Despenser (1314) [2nd] exiled & deprived 1321/2 restored 1322 executed & attainted 1326 (attainder reversed 1398)	Philip le Despenser
Hugh le Despenser; Lord le Despenser (1338) [3rd] d.s.p. 1348/9 [3rd creation extinct]	Edward le Despenser	Philip le Despenser
Edward Despenser, 1st Baron Despenser; Lord le Despenser (1357) [4th] died 1375	Henry le Despenser; Bishop of Norwich	Philip le Despenser; Lord le Despenser (1400) [5th] died 1401
Thomas Despenser; Lord le Despenser (1375) [4th] (later also [1st] & [2nd]); Earl of Gloucester executed & attainted 1399/1400 (attainder reversed 1461)	Philip Despenser de jure Lord le Despenser [5th] (never summoned) died 1424
Richard le Despenser de jure Lord Burghersh (never summoned) d.s.p. 1414	Isabel le Despenser; Countess of Worcester; Countess of Warwick	Margery le Despencer de jure Lady le Despenser [5th] died 1478
Restored; Lords le Despenser	de jure Lords le Despenser [5th] Barons Wentworth
