= Isabella of Castile, Duchess of York =

Castilian princess (1355-1392)

Isabella of Castile
- Duchess of York
- Isabella depicted in a 15th century family tree of Edward IV
- Born: 1355
- Died: 23 December 1392 (aged 36–37)
- Burial: 13 January 1393; Kings Langley Priory (1393–1575); All Saints' Church, Kings Langley (since 1575)
- Spouse: Edmund, 1st Duke of York (m. 1372)
- Issue: Edward, 2nd Duke of York; Constance of York; Richard, 3rd Earl of Cambridge
- House: Castilian House of Ivrea
- Father: Peter of Castile
- Mother: María de Padilla

Isabella of Castile, Duchess of York (1355 – 23 December 1392) was the daughter of King Peter and his mistress María de Padilla (d. 1361). She accompanied her elder sister, Constance, to England after Constance's marriage to John of Gaunt, and married Gaunt's younger brother, Edmund of Langley, 1st Duke of York.

== Life ==
Isabella was the youngest of the three daughters of King Peter of Castile by his favourite mistress, María de Padilla (d. 1361).

On 21 September 1371, Edward III's fourth son, John of Gaunt, married Isabella's older sister, Constance (d. 1394), who after the death of their father in 1369 claimed the throne of Castile. Isabella accompanied her sister to England, and on 11 July 1372, at about the age of 17, married John of Gaunt's younger brother, Edmund of Langley, 1st Duke of York, fifth son of King Edward III and Philippa of Hainault, at Wallingford, Oxfordshire, as part of a dynastic alliance in furtherance of the Plantagenet claim to the crown of Castile. According to Pugh, Isabella and Edmund of Langley were 'an ill-matched pair'.

As a result of her indiscretions, including an affair with King Richard II's half-brother, John Holland, 1st Duke of Exeter (d. 1400), whom Pugh terms 'violent and lawless', Isabella left behind a tarnished reputation, her loose morals being noted by the chronicler Thomas Walsingham. According to Pugh, the possibility that Holland was the father of Isabella's favourite son, Richard of Conisburgh, 3rd Earl of Cambridge, 'cannot be ignored'.

In her will, Isabel named King Richard as her heir, requesting him to grant her younger son, Richard, an annuity of 500 marks. The King complied. However, further largesse which might have been expected when Richard came of age was not to be, as King Richard II was deposed in 1399, and according to Harriss, Isabella's younger son, Richard, 'received no favours from the new King, Henry IV.

Isabella died 23 December 1392, aged about 37, and was buried 14 January 1393 at the priory of the Dominicans at Kings Langley. After Isabella's death, Edmund of Langley married Joan Holland, sister and co-heir of Edmund Holland, 4th Earl of Kent (9 January 1382 – 15 September 1408), with whom his daughter, Constance, had lived as his mistress (see above).

Isabella was appointed a Lady of the Garter in 1379.

== Issue ==
Coat of arms of Castile and León which Isabel adopted as the daughter of King Peter of Castile. Quarterly, Castille and Leon (Kingdom of Castille).

Isabella and Edmund of Langley, 1st Duke of York, had three children:

- Edward of Norwich, 2nd Duke of York (c. 1373 – 25 October 1415), who married firstly, Beatrice of Portugal, which marriage was annulled, and secondly, Philippa Mohun, third daughter of John Mohun, 2nd Lord Mohun (c. 1320 – 15 September 1375), and Joan Burghersh (d. 4 October 1404), daughter of Bartholomew de Burghersh (c. 1304 – 3 August 1355), 3rd Baron Burghersh. Edward served in numerous administrative offices and military campaigns during the reigns of Richard II, Henry IV and Henry V, and was slain at the Battle of Agincourt on 25 October 1415.
- Constance of York (c. 1375 – 28 November 1416), who married Thomas le Despenser, 1st Earl of Gloucester (22 September 1373 – 16 January 1400), third but first surviving son of Edward le Despenser and Elizabeth Burghersh, by whom she had a son, Richard, and two daughters, Elizabeth and Isabel. Constance was involved in a plot to abduct the young Edmund Mortimer, 5th Earl of March, in February 1405, and in turn implicated her elder brother, Edward. After the death of her husband she was either betrothed to or lived as the mistress of Edmund Holland, 4th Earl of Kent (9 January 1382 – 15 September 1408), and had a daughter by him, Eleanor Holland (died c. 1459), who married James Tuchet, 5th Baron Audley.
- Richard of Conisburgh, 3rd Earl of Cambridge (1385 – 5 August 1415), who married Anne Mortimer, and was beheaded on 5 August 1415 for his role in the Southampton Plot.

== Shakespeare and Isabella of Castile ==
Isabella is depicted, ahistorically, as living in late December 1399 at the time of the Epiphany Rising in Act V of Shakespeare's Richard II.

== Footnotes ==
=== Works cited ===
- Cokayne, George Edward (1959). The Complete Peerage, edited by Geoffrey H. White. Vol. XII(2). London: St. Catherine Press.
- Harriss, G.L. (2004). "Richard, earl of Cambridge (1385–1415)". Oxford Dictionary of National Biography (online ed.). Oxford University Press. doi:10.1093/ref:odnb/23502. (Subscription, Wikipedia Library access or UK public library membership required.) (subscription required)
- Pugh, T.B. (1988). Henry V and the Southampton Plot of 1415. Alan Sutton. ISBN 0-8629-9541-8.
- Richardson, Douglas (2011). Magna Carta Ancestry: A Study in Colonial and Medieval Families, ed. Kimball G. Everingham. Vol. II (2nd ed.). Salt Lake City. ISBN 978-1-4499-6638-6.
- Tuck, Anthony (2004). "Edmund, first duke of York (1341–1402)". Oxford Dictionary of National Biography (online ed.). Oxford University Press. doi:10.1093/ref:odnb/16023. (Subscription, Wikipedia Library access or UK public library membership required.)
- Weir, Alison (2011). Britain's Royal Families: The Complete Genealogy. London. ISBN 978-1-4464-4911-0.
- Works related to Edward of Langley, 2nd Duke of York at Wikisource: Dictionary of National Biography, 1885–1900, Volume 45, pages 401-404.
