= Sandra Worth =

Canadian-American author of fiction (born 1954)

Sandra Worth (born 1954) is a Canadian-American author of fiction.

For her bachelor's degree from the University of Toronto, she took a double major in Political Science and Economics.

Her debut novel The Rose of York: Love and War was published in 2003.

Worth researched the 15th century for ten years when writing her trilogy on the Wars of the Roses. She obtained privileges at the British Museum and visited university libraries across Canada and the United States. She also interviewed several notable Ricardian scholars, including Peter W. Hammond and Bertram Fields, and made more than ten trips to England and Bruges to examine Ricardian sites.

In 2007, Worth signed a two book deal with Penguin Group (USA), to produce two more books taking place during the War of the Roses, both published in 2008 as Lady of the Roses and The King’s Daughter, a novel on the life of Elizabeth of York, mother of Henry VIII. In 2009, each of these novels garnered several Reviewers' Choice awards, including the Romantic Times Magazine's Award for Best Historical Biography of the Year; Philippa Gregory was one of the four nominees. Also in 2009, Worth entered into another book deal with the Penguin Group for Pale Rose of England, a novel on the life of Perkin Warbeck, the Pretender to the throne of England and his wife, Princess Catherine Gordon of Scotland.

== Bibliography ==
- The Rose of York: Love and War. End Table, 2003
- The Rose of York: Crown of Destiny. End Table, 2006
- The Rose of York: Fall From Grace. End Table, 2007
- Lady of the Roses: A Novel of the Wars of the Roses. New York: Berkley, January 2, 2008
- The King's Daughter: A Novel of the First Tudor Queen. New York: Berkley, December 8, 2008
- Pale Rose of York. New York: Berkley, February 1, 2011
