= Thomas Despenser, 1st Earl of Gloucester =

English noble

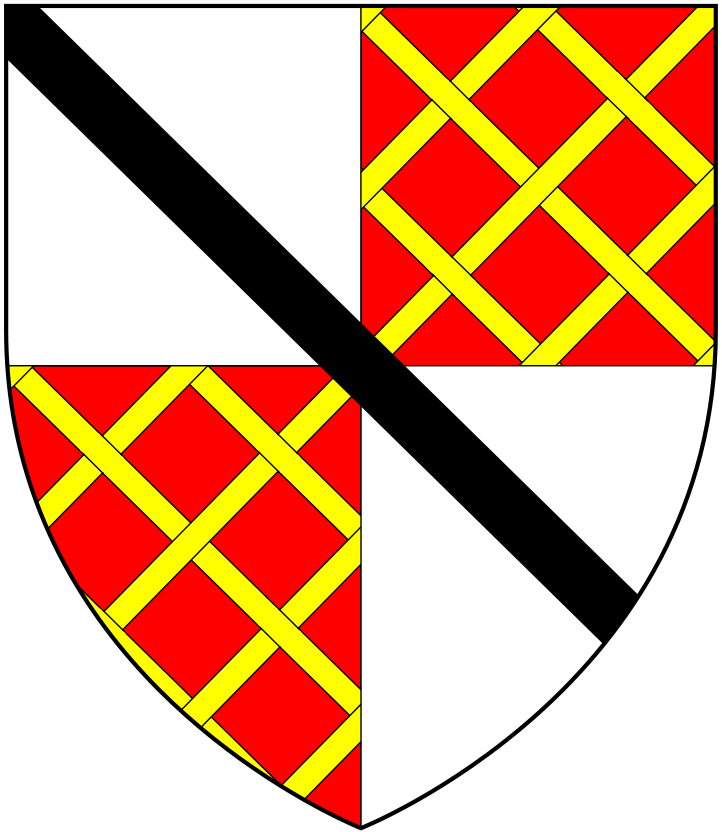
Arms of Sir Thomas Despenser, 1st Earl of Gloucester, KG

Thomas Despenser, 2nd Baron Despenser, 1st Earl of Gloucester (22 September 1373 – 13 January 1400) was the son of Edward le Despenser, 1st Baron le Despencer, whom he succeeded in 1375.

== Royal intrigues ==
A supporter of King Richard II against Thomas of Woodstock and the Lords Appellant, Despenser was rewarded with an earldom as Earl of Gloucester in 1397, by virtue of being descended from Gilbert de Clare, 7th earl of an earlier creation. He spent the years 1397–1399 in Ireland, attempting with little success to persuade the Gaelic chieftains to accept Richard II as their overlord.

However, Despenser supported Henry Bolingbroke on his return to England to become King Henry IV, only to be attainted (deprived of his earldom because of a capital crime) for his role in the death of Thomas of Woodstock.

Despenser then took part in the Epiphany Rising, a rebellion led by a number of barons aimed at restoring Richard to the throne by assassinating King Henry IV; this quickly failed when the conspirators were betrayed by Edward of Norwich, 2nd Duke of York to Henry. After fleeing to the western counties, a number of the Epiphany Rising conspirators were captured and killed by mobs of townspeople loyal to the king; Despenser was captured by a mob and beheaded at Bristol on 13 January 1400.

== Marriage ==
Thomas Despenser married Constance, daughter of Edmund of Langley, 1st Duke of York and Isabella of Castile, Duchess of York. They had issue:

- Elizabeth Despenser (died young c. 1398)
- Richard Despenser, 4th Baron Burghersh (1396–1414)
- Edward Despenser (born before 1400), died young
- Hugh Despenser (c. 1400 – 1401)
- Isabel Despenser (26 July 1400 – 27 December 1439); she married, firstly, Richard Beauchamp, 1st Earl of Worcester, and later married, secondly, his cousin Richard de Beauchamp, 13th Earl of Warwick.

== Ancestry and succession ==
Ancestors of Thomas Despenser, 1st Earl of Gloucester

16. Hugh le Despenser, Earl of Winchester
8. Hugh Despenser the Younger
17. Isabella de Beauchamp
4. Edward le Despenser
18. Gilbert de Clare, 6th Earl of Hertford
9. Eleanor de Clare
19. Joan of Acre
2. Edward le Despencer, 1st Baron le Despencer
20. Sir William de Ferrers
10. Sir William de Ferrers of Groby, Lord Ferrers
21. Anne le Despenser
5. Anne Ferrers
22. John de Segrave, 2nd Baron Segrave
11. Ellen de Segrave
23. Christiane du Plessis
1. Thomas Despenser
24. Robert de Burghersh, 1st Baron Burghersh
12. Bartholomew de Burghersh, 1st Baron Burghersh
25. Maud de Badlesmere
6. Bartholomew de Burghersh, 2nd Baron Burghersh
26. Theobald de Verdun, 2nd Baron Verdun
13. Elizabeth de Verdun
27. Maud Mortimer
3. Elizabeth Burghersh
28.
14. Richard of Weyland
29.
7. Cecily de Weyland
30.
31.

Peerage of England
Preceded by Edward Despenser	Baron Despenser; 1375–1400	Forfeit Attainder until 1461, abeyance thereafter
New creation	Earl of Gloucester; 1397–1399	Forfeit
