= Robert Burghersh, 1st Baron Burghersh =

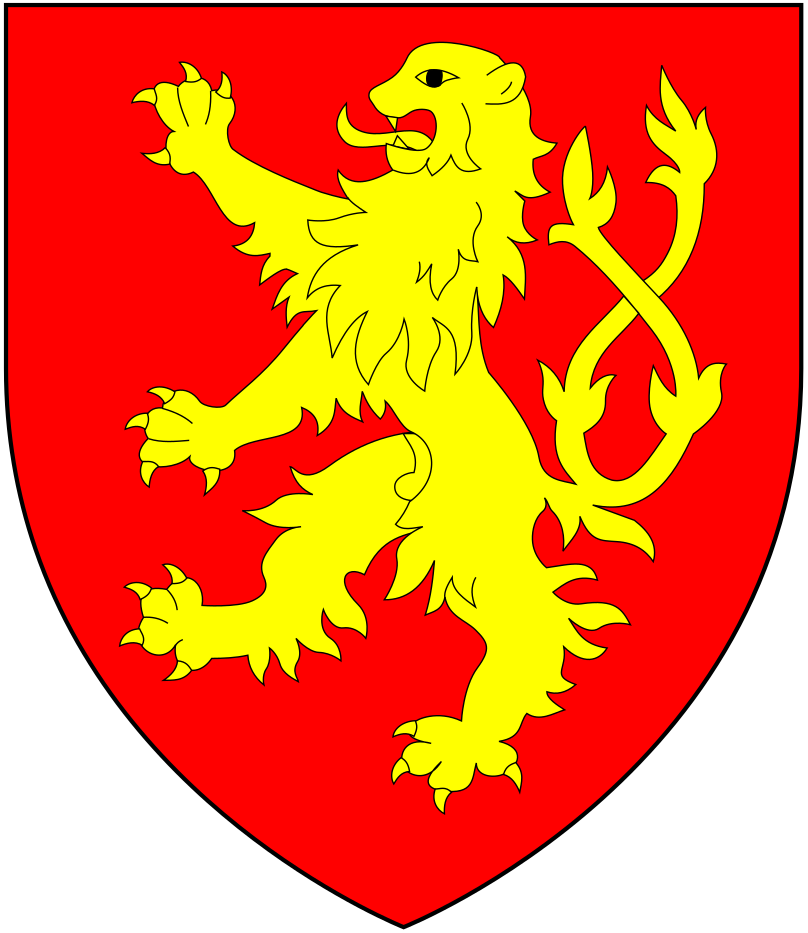
Arms of Burghersh, Baron Burghersh: Gules, a lion rampant double queued or

Robert de Burghersh, 1st Baron Burghersh, was born between 1252 and 1256, at Burghersh, in Sussex, England, and died in 1306.

He married Maud de Badlesmere (born between 1260 and 1270; died 1306), of Kent, England, the daughter of Gunselm de Badlesmere, Justiciar of Kent, around 1282.

Lord Robert Burgersh was the son and heir of Reynold de Burghersh, and was Constable of Dover Castle, and Lord Warden of the Cinque Ports from 1299 until his death. He was summoned to Parliament from 12 November 1303 until 13 July 1305, "whereby he is held to have become Lord Burghersh".

He had at least three children with Maud:

- Stephen de Burghersh (d. 1310), who succeeded him
- Henry de Burghersh, Bishop of Lincoln
- Bartholomew de Burghersh, later created Baron Burghersh in his own right.

Political offices
| Preceded by Stephen de Pencester | Lord Warden of the Cinque Ports; 1299–1306 | Succeeded by The Lord Cobham |
Peerage of England
| Preceded by New Creation | Baron Burghersh; 1303–1306 | Succeeded by Stephen de Burghersh (de jure) |
