= Elizabeth Burghersh, 3rd Baroness Burghersh =

English noblewoman

Elizabeth de Burghersh

Baroness Burghersh
- Reign: 5 April 1369-August 1402
- Predecessor: Bartholomew Burghersh
- Successor: Richard Despenser, 4th Baron Burghersh
- Born: c. 1342
- Died: August 1402
- Noble family: de Burghersh
- Spouse: Edward Despenser, 1st Baron Despenser
- Issue: Margaret le Despenser; Elizabeth le Despenser; Thomas Despenser, 1st Earl of Gloucester; Hugh Despenser; Cicely Despenser; Anne Despenser
- Father: Bartholomew Burghersh
- Mother: Cicely de Weyland

Elizabeth Despenser, 3rd Baroness Burghersh (c. 1342 – August 1402) was an English noblewoman born to Bartholomew de Burghersh, 2nd Baron Burghersh and his wife, Cicely Weyland.

Some recently constructed genealogies purport that she was first married, some time after 1347, to Maurice FitzGerald, 4th Earl of Kildare (d. 25 August 1390) and by him had at least four children. Yet it is more consistent with known dates of death of the 4th Earl of Kildare that he married instead Margaret, a daughter of the 1st Baron Burghersh. Otherwise there would be record of Kildare's divorce from Elizabeth and probably a mention in the original records of her 'remarriage' rather than of her 'marriage' to le Despencer.

But these 'recently constructed genealogies' appear to be incorrect. It is impossible that Elizabeth, wife of Maurice FitzGerald is the lady who remarried 2ndly Edward le Despencer. The reason is that Maurice died on 25 August 1390, well before Edward le Despencer's marriage. This makes it more certain that Despenser married Elizabeth, daughter of Bartholomew de Burghersh the younger, 2nd Baron Burghersh.

She was married (it is said for the second time) some time before 1373, to Edward Despenser, 1st Baron Despenser (c. 24 March 1335-6 – 11 November 1375) and they had six children. Upon the death of her father on 5 April 1369, she inherited the title of Baroness Burghersh.

After her husband died, she remained a widow for thirty-three years, dying in 1409. She was buried to the left of her husband at Tewkesbury Abbey in the Holy Trinity chapel, which she had built for him.

== Children ==
By Edward le Despenser:

- Margaret le Despenser (died 3 November 1415), married Robert de Ferrers, 5th Baron Ferrers of Chartley
- Elizabeth le Despenser (died 10 April/11 April 1408)
  married
  (1) John FitzAlan, 2nd Baron Arundel
  (2) William la Zouche, 3rd Baron Zouche
- Thomas Despenser, 1st Earl of Gloucester (22 September 1373 – 13 January 1400), married Constance of York
- Hugh Despenser
- Cicely Despenser
- Anne Despenser (died 30 October 1426)
  married
  (1) Hugh Hastings
  (2) Thomas de Morley, 4th Baron Morley

== Sources ==
- Burke, John. A General and Heraldic Dictionary of the Peerages of England, Ireland, and Scotland, Extinct, Dormant, and in Abeyance. London: H. Colburn and R. Bentley, 1831, pp. 173–174.
- Weis, Frederick Lewis, Walter Lee Sheppard, David Faris, and Frederick Lewis Weis. Ancestral Roots of Certain American Colonists Who Came to America Before 1700: The Lineage of Alfred the Great, Charlemagne, Malcolm of Scotland, Robert the Strong, and Some of Their Descendants (7th edition), Baltimore, Maryland: Genealogical Publishing, 1992, pp. 73–74, lines:70-35, 70-36, 74-34, 212-34.
- "Fitzgerald, Maurice, 4th Earl of Kildare", Dictionary of National Biography, (Leslie Stephen ed.), Macmillan & Co., London, 1889

Peerage of England
Preceded by Bartholomew de Burghersh	Baroness Burghersh; 1369–1402	Succeeded by Richard le Despencer, 4th Baron Burghersh
