= Constance of York, Countess of Gloucester =

Constance of York
- Baroness le Despencer; Countess of Gloucester
- Born: c. 1375; Conisburgh Castle, Yorkshire, Kingdom of England
- Died: 28 November 1416; Reading Abbey, Berkshire, England
- Spouse: Thomas le Despenser, 1st Earl of Gloucester (m. 1397; died 1400)
- Issue: Richard le Despenser, 4th Baron Burghersh; Elizabeth le Despenser; Isabel le Despenser, Countess of Worcester and Warwick; Eleanor de Holland
- House: York
- Father: Edmund of Langley, 1st Duke of York
- Mother: Isabella of Castile
- Religion: Roman Catholicism

Constance of York, Countess of Gloucester (c. 1375 – 28 November 1416) was the only daughter of Edmund of Langley, 1st Duke of York, and his wife Isabella of Castile.

== Family ==
Constance was born in about 1375, the only daughter of Edmund of Langley, 1st Duke of York, and his first wife, Isabella of Castile, the youngest daughter of King Peter of Castile and his mistress, María de Padilla.

== Plots against Henry IV ==
Constance married Thomas le Despenser, 1st Earl of Gloucester, who was created Earl of Gloucester by King Richard II on 29 September 1397, but after Richard's deposition and the accession of King Henry IV some of Thomas's lands were seized and he was degraded from the earldom. In consequence, he and others joined in a plot in December 1399 (known as the Epiphany Rising) to assassinate King Henry and restore King Richard to the throne. According to a French chronicle, the plot was betrayed to the king by Constance's brother, Edward; however, contemporary English chronicles make no mention of Edward's alleged role. Gloucester escaped immediate capture, but was eventually turned in to the authorities at Bristol, where he was beheaded on 13 January 1400. After her husband's death, Constance was granted a life interest in the greater part of his lands and custody of her son due to her close kinship to the king.

In February 1405, during the rebellion of Owain Glyndŵr, Constance herself instigated a plot to abduct the young Edmund Mortimer, 5th Earl of March, and his brother, Roger Mortimer, from Windsor Castle. She apparently intended to deliver the young Earl, who had the best claim to the English throne of any of Henry IV's rivals, to his uncle Sir Edmund Mortimer, who was married to Glyndwr's daughter, Catrin ferch Owain Glyndŵr. The young Edmund Mortimer and his brother were recaptured before entering Wales. Constance implicated her elder brother, Edward, in the plot, as a result of which he was imprisoned for 17 weeks at Pevensey Castle. He was eventually restored to Henry IV's favour. Constance was sent to Kenilworth Castle and also eventually had her seized property returned.

== Marriage and issue ==
Shortly before 7 November 1397, Constance married Thomas le Despenser, 1st Earl of Gloucester (1373–1400), third but first surviving son of Edward le Despenser and Elizabeth Burghersh, by whom she had a son and two daughters:

- Richard le Despenser, 4th Baron Burghersh (1396–1414). He married Lady Eleanor Neville (c. 1397 – 1472), daughter of Ralph de Neville, 1st Earl of Westmorland (d. 1425) and Joan Beaufort (d. 1440), daughter of John of Gaunt by Katherine Swynford. He died young without issue.
- Elizabeth (died young c. 1398).
- Isabel, born after her father's execution. She married, firstly, Richard Beauchamp, Earl of Worcester (d. 1422). A daughter, Elizabeth, Lady Abergavenny (b. 1415) was the sole product of this union. Following Worcester's death, she married Richard de Beauchamp, 13th Earl of Warwick; they were parents to Henry Beauchamp, 1st Duke of Warwick and Anne Beauchamp, 16th Countess of Warwick.

After her husband's death, Constance was either betrothed to or lived as the mistress of Edmund Holland, 4th Earl of Kent (1383–1408), by whom she had an illegitimate daughter, Eleanor Holland, who married James Tuchet, 5th Baron Audley (died 1459).

== Death ==
Constance died in 1416 after the accession of Henry V, outliving both her siblings, but she was buried at the High Altar in Reading Abbey as late as 1420.

== Ancestry ==
Ancestors of Constance of York, Countess of Gloucester

8. Edward II of England
4. Edward III of England
9. Isabella of France
2. Edmund of Langley, 1st Duke of York
10. William I, Count of Hainaut
5. Philippa of Hainault
11. Joan of Valois
1. Constance of York
12. Alfonso XI of Castile
6. Pedro of Castile
13. Maria of Portugal
3. Isabella of Castile
14. Juan García de Padilla
7. María de Padilla
15. María Fernández de Henestrosa
