= Richard Beauchamp, 13th Earl of Warwick =

14th/15th-century English noble

Richard Beauchamp
- 13th Earl of Warwick
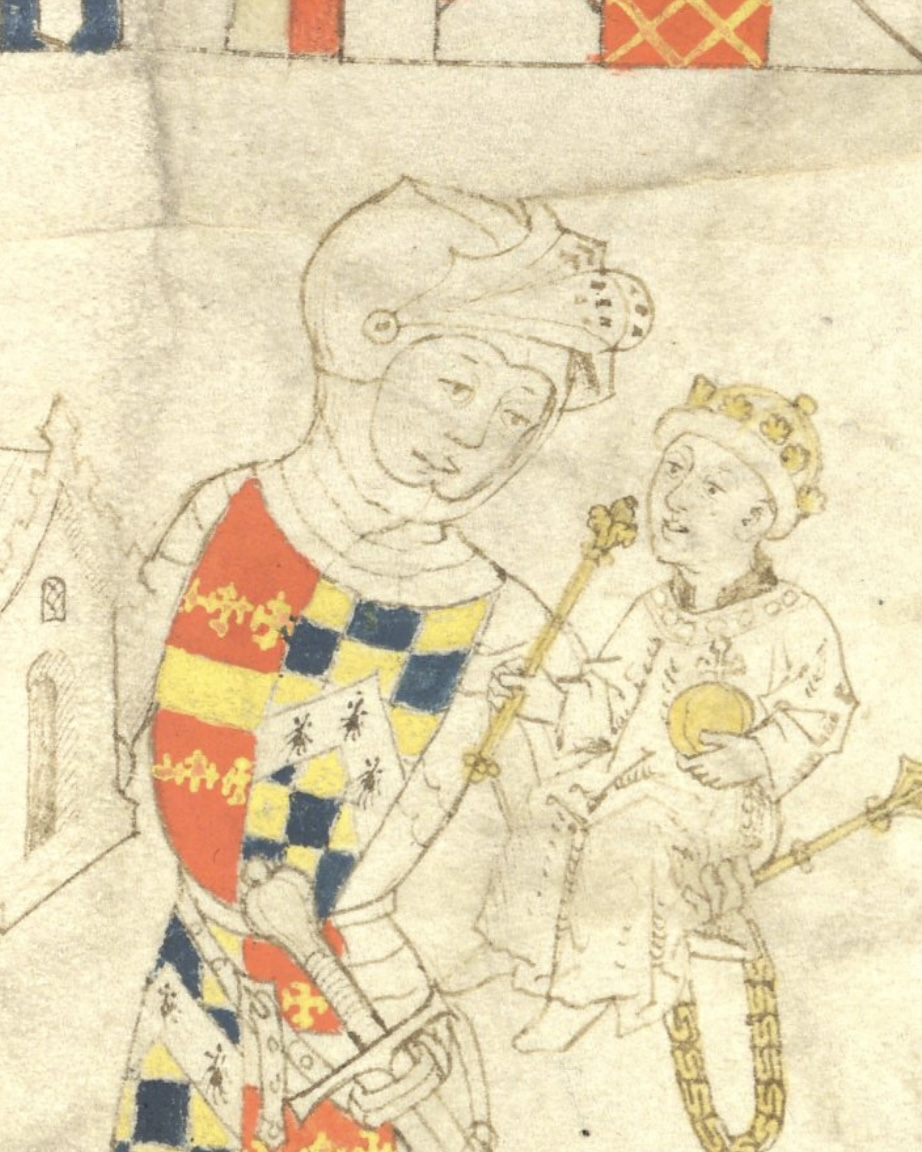
- Drawing of Richard holding Henry VI from the Rous Roll, c. 1483
- Tenure: 8 April 1401 – 30 April 1439
- Other titles: Count of Aumale
- Born: 25 or 28 January 1382; Salwarpe Court, Worcestershire, Kingdom of England
- Died: 30 April 1439 (aged 57); Rouen, Duchy of Normandy, Kingdom of France
- Residence: Warwick Castle
- Spouses: Elizabeth de Berkeley; Isabel le Despenser
- Issue: With Elizabeth de Berkeley; Margaret, Countess of Shrewsbury; Eleanor, Duchess of Somerset; Elizabeth, Baroness Latimer; With Isabel le Despenser; Henry, Duke of Warwick; Anne, 16th Countess of Warwick
- Parents: Thomas de Beauchamp, 12th Earl of Warwick; Margeret Ferrers

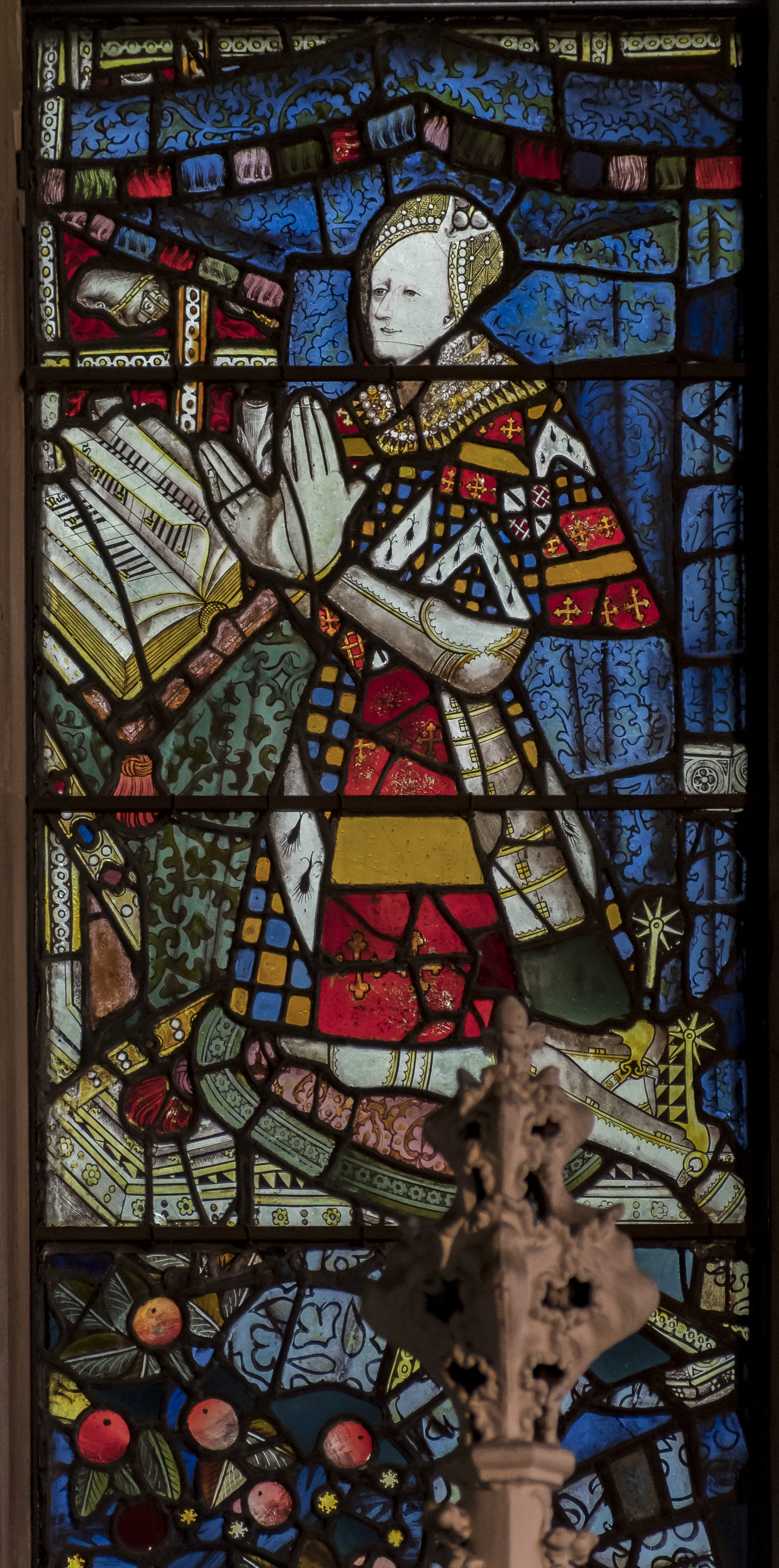
Stained glass depiction of Richard Beauchamp, 13th Earl of Warwick (with original hands and head missing, replaced by head of a woman), St Mary's Church, Warwick. Arms on his tabard: Beauchamp quartering Newburgh with an inescutcheon of the pretence of Despencer. Fragments of a bear from the Bear and Ragged Staff badge of the Earls of Warwick is visible

Richard Beauchamp, 13th Earl of Warwick KG (25 or 28 January 1382 – 30 April 1439) was an English medieval nobleman and military commander.

== Early life ==
Beauchamp was born at Salwarpe Court in Salwarpe, Worcestershire, the son of Thomas de Beauchamp, 12th Earl of Warwick and Margaret Ferrers, a daughter of William Ferrers, 3rd Baron Ferrers of Groby. His godfather was King Richard II of England.

He was knighted at the coronation of King Henry IV, and succeeded as Earl of Warwick in 1401.

== Welsh rebellion ==
Soon after reaching his majority and taking responsibility for the Earldom, he saw military action in Wales, defending against a Welsh rebellion led by Owain Glyndŵr. On 22 July 1403, the day after the Battle of Shrewsbury, he was made a Knight of the Garter.

In the summer of 1404, he rode into what is today Monmouthshire at the head of an English force. Warwick engaged Welsh forces at the Battle of Mynydd Cwmdu, near Tretower Castle a few miles northwest of Crickhowell, nearly capturing Owain Glyndwr himself, taking Owain's banner, and forcing the Welsh to flee. The Welsh were chased down the valley of the River Usk where they regrouped and turned the tables on the pursuing English force, attempting an ambush. They chased the English in turn to the town walls of Monmouth after a skirmish at Craig-y-Dorth, a conical hill near Mitchel Troy.

== Chivalry and Pilgrimage ==
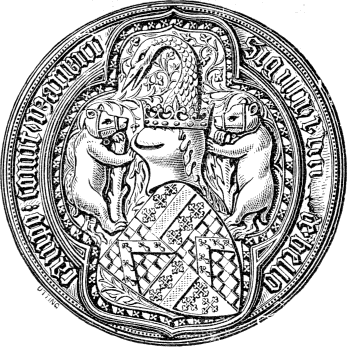
Seal of Richard Beauchamp, Earl of Warwick

Warwick acquired quite a reputation for chivalry, when in 1408 he went on pilgrimage to the Holy Land, and was challenged many times to fight in the sporting combat which was then popular. On the return trip, he went through Russia and Eastern Europe; in 1410 he tried to join Teutonic Order after the battle of Grunwald, not returning to England until later the same year.

== Soldier of the King ==
In 1410, he was appointed a member of the royal council, and two years later he was fighting in command at Calais. Up to this time, Warwick's career had been that of the typical knight-errant, but in 1413 he was Lord High Steward at the Prince's coronation as Henry V of England, and became a trusted counsellor to the king. The following year he helped put down the Lollard uprising, and then went to Normandy as Captain of Calais, and represented England at the coronation of Sigismund as King of Germany and the Council of Constance.

Warwick spent much of the next decade fighting the French in the Hundred Years' War. He took a prominent part in the campaigns of 1417–18. Then he joined the king before Rouen, and in October 1418 had charge of the negotiations with the dauphin Louis and with the duke of Burgundy. Next year he was again the chief English spokesman in the conference at Meulan, and afterwards was Henry's representative in arranging the Treaty of Troyes. He held high command at sieges of French towns between 1420 and 1422.

In 1419, he was created Count of Aumale, as part of the King's policy of giving out Norman titles to his nobles. He was appointed Master of the Horse.

== Responsibilities ==
Henry V's will gave Warwick the responsibility for the education of the infant Henry VI of England. This duty required him to travel back and forth between England and Normandy many times, and during these travels, he acted as superintendent of the trial of Joan of Arc.

In 1437, when the king's minority ended, the Royal Council deemed his duty complete. Despite his age (then 55), he loyally accepted an appointment as lieutenant of France and Normandy. Arriving in Normandy on 8 November, he ruled with vigour and remained in France for the remaining two years of his life.

== Marriages and children ==
Warwick first married Elizabeth de Berkeley (c. 1386 – 28 December 1422), before 5 October 1397, the daughter of Thomas de Berkeley, 5th Baron Berkeley and Margaret de Lisle, 3rd Baroness de Lisle. Together they had 3 daughters:

- Lady Margaret de Beauchamp (1404–1467), who married John Talbot, 1st Earl of Shrewsbury, and whose great-great-grandson, John Dudley, was created Earl of Warwick and subsequently, Duke of Northumberland.
- Lady Eleanor de Beauchamp (1408–1467), who first married Thomas de Ros, 8th Baron de Ros, and then married Edmund Beaufort, 2nd Duke of Somerset.
- Lady Elizabeth de Beauchamp (1417–1480), who first married George Neville, 1st Baron Latimer, and then married Thomas VI Wake of Blisworth (1435–1476).

Warwick then married Lady Isabel le Despenser (26 July 1400 – 1439), the daughter of Thomas le Despenser, 1st Earl of Gloucester and Constance of York. With Isabel, who was also the widow of his first cousin, Richard de Beauchamp, 1st Earl of Worcester, his children were:

- Henry de Beauchamp (1425–1446), who succeeded his father as Earl of Warwick, and later became Duke of Warwick.
- Lady Anne de Beauchamp (1426–1492), who succeeded as the 16th Countess of Warwick in her own right, after the death of her niece. She married Richard Neville, 16th Earl of Warwick, famously known as the "Kingmaker".

== Death, Burial, and Legacy ==
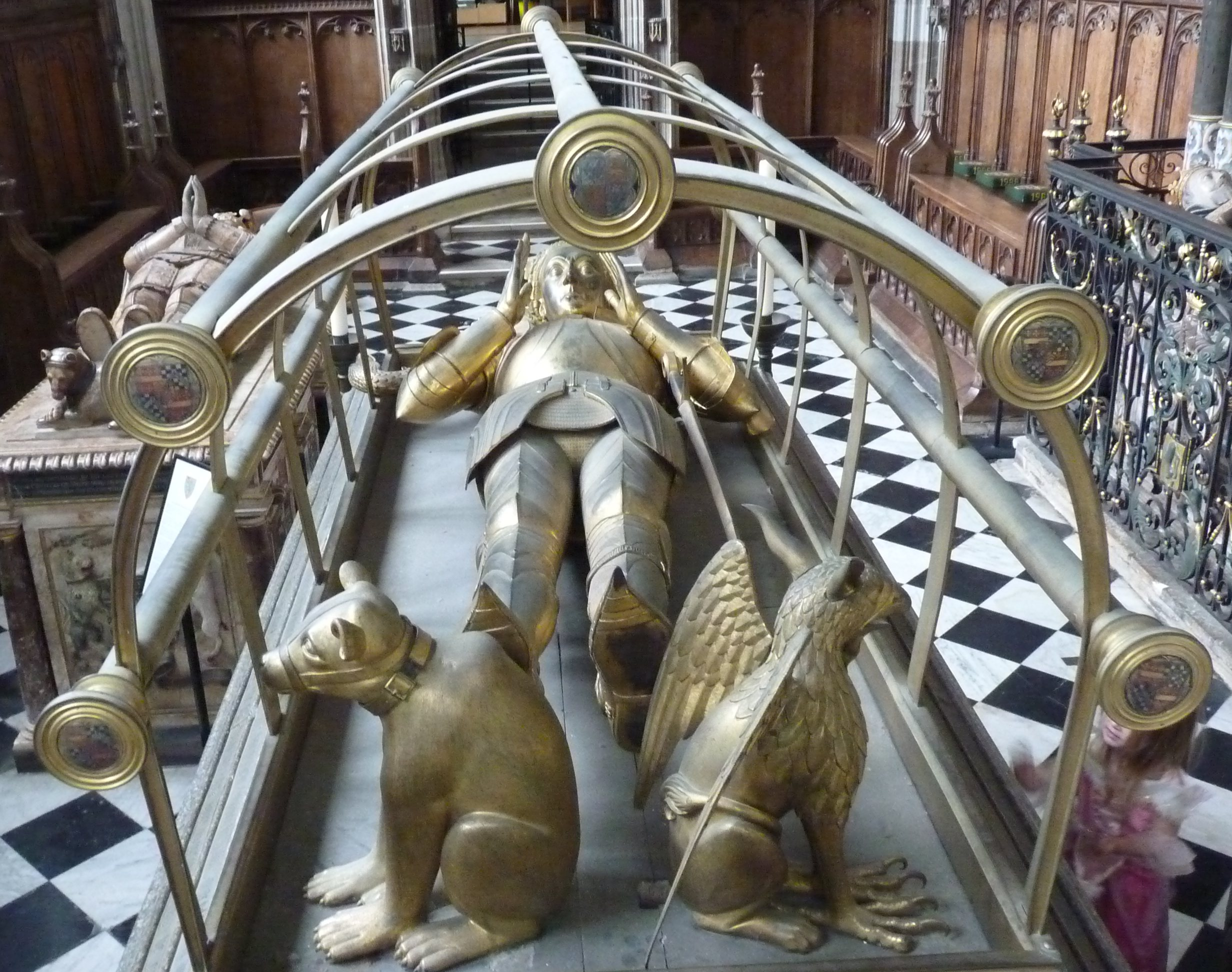
Effigy of Richard de Beauchamp in the Beauchamp Chapel of St Mary's Church, Warwick. The finest piece of English 15th-century bronze sculpture, modelled and cast by William Austen of London, and gilded and engraved by Bartholomew Lambespring, a Dutch goldsmith.

Richard de Beauchamp's will was made at Caversham Castle in Oxfordshire (now in Berkshire), one of his favoured residences, in 1437. Most of his property was entailed, but with a portion of the rest, the will established a substantial trust. After his debts were paid, the trust endowed the Collegiate Church of St Mary in Warwick, and called for the construction of a new chapel there. It also enlarged the endowment of the chantries at Elmley Castle and Guy's Cliffe, and gave a gift to Tewkesbury Abbey. Beauchamp died in Rouen, Normandy, two years later, on 30 April 1439. After the completion of the chapel, his body was in 1475 transferred there, where his magnificent gilt-bronze monumental effigy may still be seen.

Beauchamp's life was chronicled in an important 15th-century manuscript, The Pageants of the Birth, Life and Death of Richard Beauchamp, Earl of Warwick, likely commissioned by his daughter, Anne Beauchamp, wife to Richard Neville, the famed "Kingmaker".

== Notes ==
Peerage of England
Preceded by Thomas de Beauchamp	Earl of Warwick; 1401–1439	Succeeded by Henry de Beauchamp
