= Bartholomew Burghersh the elder =

English nobleman and soldier (died 1355)

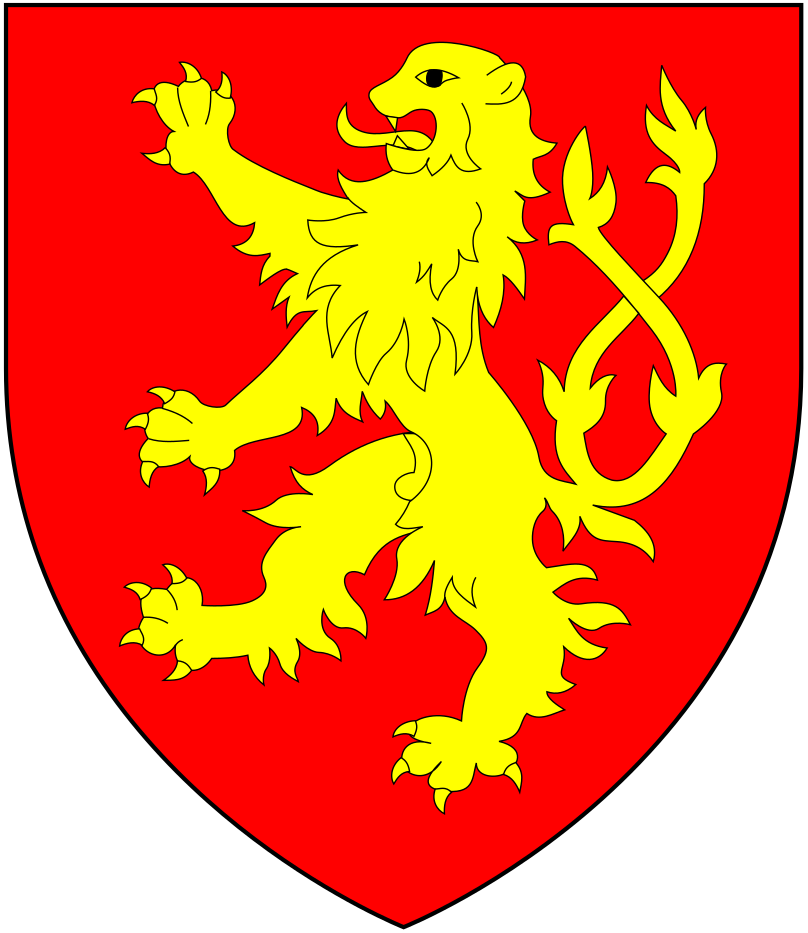
Arms of Burghersh: Gules, a lion rampant double queued or

Bartholomew Burghersh, 1st Baron Burghersh (died 3 August 1355, Dover), called "the elder", was an English nobleman and soldier, a younger son of Robert Burghersh, 1st Baron Burghersh and Maud Badlesmere, sister of Bartholomew Badlesmere, 1st Baron Badlesmere. He was the father of Bartholomew Burghersh the younger.

== Life ==
He was the second (or perhaps the third) son of Robert Burghersh, 1st Baron Burghersh, and succeeded to his father's title and estates on the death of his elder brother Stephen. He was the nephew on his mother's side and namesake of Bartholomew, lord Badlesmere, one of the most powerful of the barons. He married Elizabeth, one of the three co-heiresses of Theobald de Verdun, 2nd Baron Verdun and his first wife Maud Mortimer (c.1289-18 September 1312), an alliance by which Burghersh increased his wealth and power.

Lord Badlesmere was a bitter enemy of Thomas, Earl of Lancaster. Burghersh took an active role (1316) in the unhappy contests of parties in Edward II's reign as an adherent of his uncle, whom in 1317 he accompanied in an expedition to Scotland. In October 1321, when Leeds Castle, Kent—the gates of which had been shut against Queen Isabella by Lady Badlesmere – surrendered to Edward, who had with unwonted spirit raised a force of thirty thousand men to avenge the insult offered to his wife. Burghersh, who was one of the garrison, was taken prisoner and incarcerated in the Tower of London. This imprisonment was probably the means of saving him from the fate of his uncle after the disastrous battle of Boroughbridge.

He was spared to aid in the overthrow of his unfortunate sovereign. On the landing of Isabella, on 24 September 1326, his brother Henry Burghersh, the bishop of Lincoln, hastened to join her, and with Orlton, bishop of Hereford, took the initiative in the measures which speedily led to Edward's deposition and murder.

The important posts of constable of Dover Castle and warden of the Cinque Ports, which had been held by his father, were given to Burghersh, and he held both offices, with but slight intermission, to his death. In the unsettled relations between England and France, which lasted through the greater part of Edward IlI's reign, the responsibility devolving on the holder of these offices, which implied the command of the chief channel of communication between the two countries, was of the highest moment, and it evidences the confidence reposed in Burghersh that he should have held them almost continuously during so important an epoch.

The commission, even originally in the name of Edward II, out really proceeding from the party conspiring only too successfully against him, was renewed by his son in the first year of his reign. The first royal missive to him in this capacity, contained in Rymer, is an order to have sixty does taken from the king's park of Braboume, and salted for the use of the parliament about to meet at Westminster. This is followed by an order to use his authority to put a stop to predatory incursions on the French coast. Burghersh evidently very speedily obtained the complete confidence of the young king, which he retained uninterruptedly to the end of his life.

His services were rewarded by large grants of land and manorial privileges, escheated to the crown, or in some other way falling to the sovereign to dispose of. The King despatched him repeatedly on diplomatic errands. In 1329, he was sent to Philip of France to explain the reasons for the delay in the rendering of his homage, and in the same year as an ambassador to the pope, to plead for pecuniary aid from the revenues of the English church, a tenth of which was granted to the king for four years. Rymer contains a series of royal orders issued to him in his capacity of constable of Dover relating to prohibitions or licenses to cross the sea when the peace of the country was threatened, and to make arrangements for the passage of the king and other distinguished persons.

He was entrusted with other offices calling for vigour of action and practical wisdom. In 1337, on the assumption by Edward of the title of king of France, he was made admiral of the fleet from the mouth of the Thames westward. He was also appointed Seneschal of Ponthieu, Constable of the Tower of London, and Lord Chamberlain of the Household, in which capacity his presence is often recorded at delivery the great seal. In one of Edward's grievous straits for money, he was entrusted with the pawning of the crown and other jewels. As Keeper of the king's forest to the south of the Trent in 1341 he was commissioned to provide timber for the construction of engines of war and 'hourdes' or wooden stages for the defenders of castle walls. As a good and experienced soldier he was continually in attendance on the king in his Scotch and French wars, taking part in the Battle of Crécy, 26 August 1346.

The confidence reposed in Burghersh as a diplomatic agent was equally great. He was frequently sent as may be seen in Rymer – often in company with Bishop William Bateman of Norwich – to treat with the pope at Avignon, with Philip of Valois with the counts of Brahant and Flanders, and other leading powers, on the traces and armistices so repeatedly made and broken, and to arrange the often promised but long deferred final peace between the two contending nations. As characteristic of the age, it is curious to find that under an excess of religious zeal, Burghersh, before the breaking out of the war with France when the return was comparatively quiet, had laid aside his arms and assumed the cross. Edward, unable to dispense with the services of so valuable a helper, when starting for Gascony in 1377, petitioned the pope to release him from his vow. Two years after Crecy we find him again taking part in the French wars, and despatched to Avignon to treat with the pope for a firm and lasting peace between the two countries. The next year (1349) he accompanied the earl of Lancaster to Gascony, to suppress the rebellion there. In 1355, when Edward was leaving England for a fresh invasion of France, Burghersh was appointed one of the guardians of the realm, but died at the beginning of August of that year.

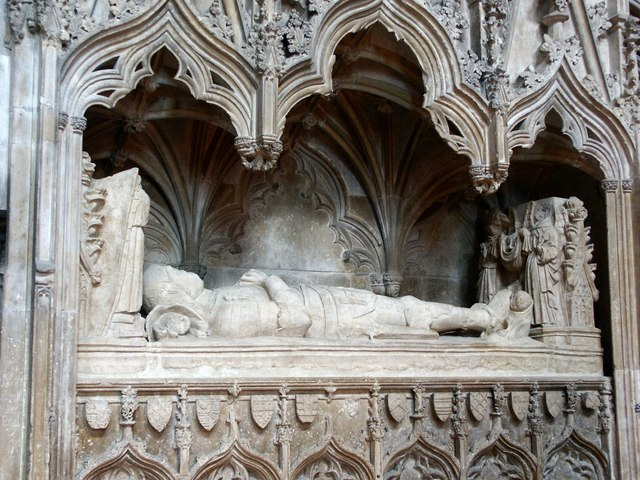
Tomb of Bartholomew Burghersh and sons in Lincoln Cathedral

He was buried in the chantry of St. Catherine, which he had founded in Lincoln minster for the soul of his brother Henry, bishop of Lincoln, and their father, Robert Burghersh. Monuments to all three, with effigies of the two brothers, are still to be seen.

== Family ==
He had the following children by his wife Elizabeth de Verdun, 2nd daughter of Theobald de Verdun, 2nd Baron Verdun:

- Henry de Burghersh (died November 1348), married Isabel St John, daughter of Hugh St John, 2nd Baron St John of Basing but left no issue
- Bartholomew Burghersh the younger (died 1369), married Cecily de Weyland
- Thomas de Burghersh
- Joan de Burghersh, married John Mohun, 2nd Baron Mohun
- Margaret de Burghersh
- Maud de Burghersh, married Sir John Grey, 2nd Baron Grey of Rotherfield in Oxfordshire, son of John de Grey, 1st Baron Grey de Rotherfield, by his first wife Katherine Fitzalan. Their heir was their grandson Bartholomew Grey (4th Baron Grey of Rotherfield), named after his Burghersh great grandfather. Bartholomew Grey was the son of his parents' eldest son John Grey and his wife Elizabeth, dau. of Sir Richard de Poynings.
- Elizabeth Burghersh, who married Maurice FitzGerald, 4th Earl of Kildare, and was the mother of four sons, including Gerald FitzGerald, 5th Earl of Kildare, and John FitzGerald, the 6th Earl.

Bartholomew de Burghersh the elder was succeeded as Baron Burghersh by his son Bartholomew.

== Sources ==
- Ancestral Roots of Certain American Colonists Who Came to America Before 1700 by Frederick Lewis Weis, Lines: 70–32, 70–33.
- Excerpt from The Institution, Laws and Ceremonies of the Most Noble Order of the Garter, by Elias Ashmole

Political offices
Preceded by Lord Basset of Drayton	Lord Warden of the Cinque Ports; 1327–1330	Succeeded by The Earl of Huntingdon
Preceded by The Earl of Huntingdon	Lord Warden of the Cinque Ports; 1348–1355	Succeeded by The Earl of Dunbar
Legal offices
Preceded by Robert of Ufford	Justice in eyre south of the Trent; 1335–1343	Succeeded by The Earl of Huntingdon
Peerage of England
New creation	Baron Burghersh; 1329–1355	Succeeded by Bartholomew Burghersh
