= Anne Beauchamp, 16th Countess of Warwick =

English noblewoman (1426–1492)

Anne Beauchamp
- 16th Countess of Warwick (suo jure); Countess of Salisbury
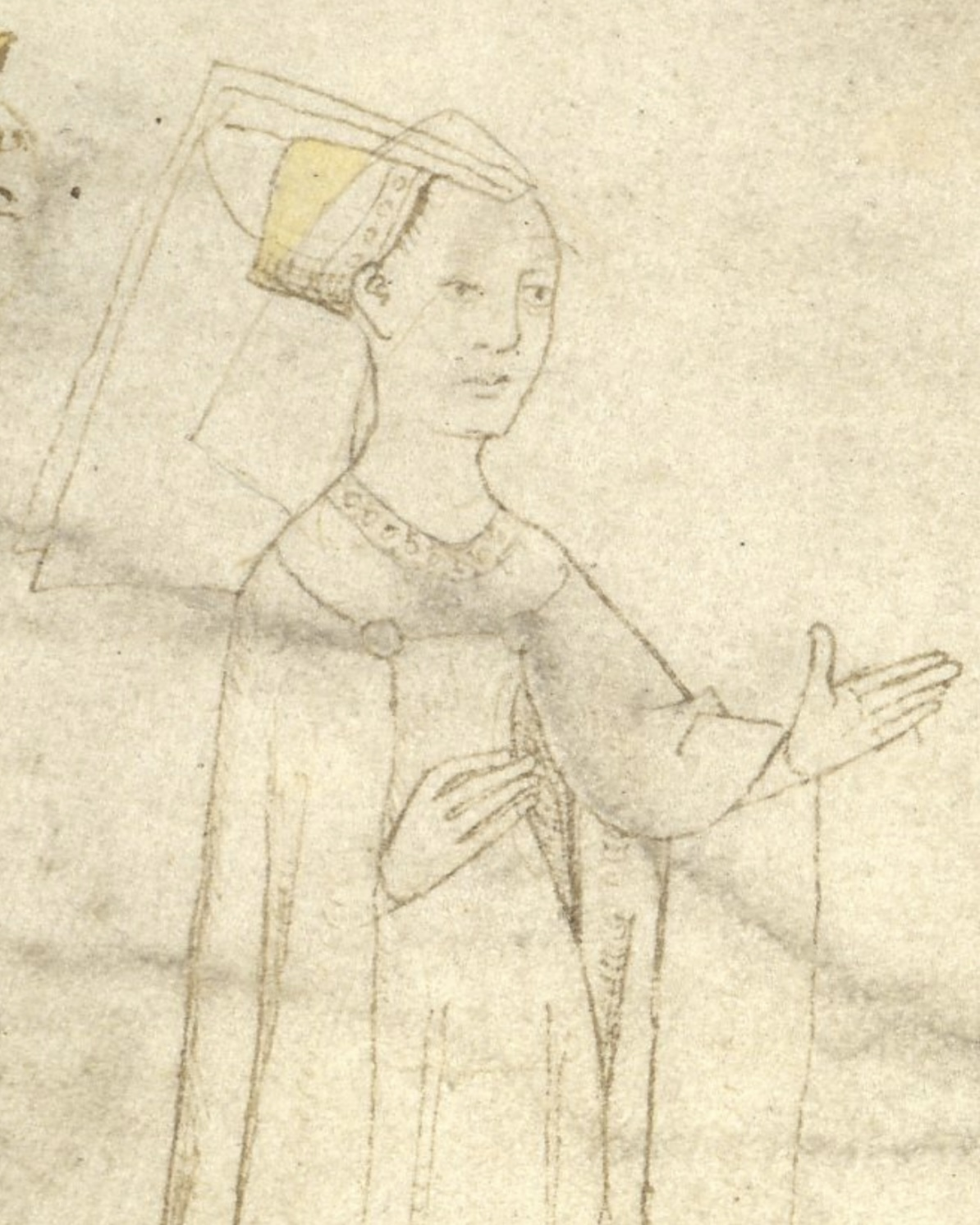
- Drawing of Anne from the Rous Roll, c. 1483
- Born: 13 July 1426; Caversham Castle, Oxfordshire, England
- Died: 20 September 1492 (aged 66)
- Noble family: Beauchamp; Neville (by marriage)
- Spouse: Richard Neville, 6th Earl of Salisbury (m. 1436; died 1471)
- Issue: Isabel, Duchess of Clarence; Anne, Queen of England
- Father: Richard Beauchamp, 13th Earl of Warwick
- Mother: Isabel Despenser

Anne Beauchamp, 16th Countess of Warwick (13 July 1426 – 20 September 1492) was an important late medieval English noblewoman. She was the daughter of Richard Beauchamp, 13th Earl of Warwick, and his second wife, Isabel Despenser. She married Richard Neville "the Kingmaker", who became Earl of Warwick by right of Anne. She was the mother of two famous daughters, Isabel Neville, the wife of George Plantagenet, Duke of Clarence, and Anne Neville, Queen of England as the wife of King Richard III.

She has been described as "diplomatic, intelligent and resilient", and was at the centre of politics during the Wars of the Roses.

== Inheritance ==
Lady Anne Beauchamp was born at Caversham Castle in Oxfordshire (now Berkshire) on 13 July 1426, the daughter of Richard Beauchamp, 13th Earl of Warwick, and Isabel Despenser. Through her mother, she was the great-great-granddaughter of Edward III of England via his fourth surviving son, Edmund of Langley, 1st Duke of York.

In 1436, she married her third cousin Richard Neville, later known as 'the Kingmaker', at the age of ten; the same year her brother Henry Beauchamp married Neville's sister Cecily. Following the death of Anne's father in 1439, and subsequently that of her brother Henry in 1446, and his five-year-old daughter Anne Beauchamp, 15th Countess of Warwick in 1449, Neville inherited the title and the considerable estates of the Earldom of Warwick through his wife.

However, this was contested by Anne's three older half-sisters, children of her father's first marriage to Elizabeth, heiress of the Berkeley estates. One of these, Lady Eleanor, was married to Edmund Beaufort, 2nd Duke of Somerset (killed at the First Battle of St Albans in 1455). The litigation over the Warwick inheritance only fuelled the enmity between this branch of the Nevilles and the Beauforts who were closely related. Anne Beauchamp's husband, Richard, was the grandson of Joan Beaufort, Countess of Westmorland, sister of the Duke's late father. Law considered that Anne Beauchamp being a full-blooded aunt of the last countess was more eligible to inherit than her older half-sisters, who were thus not coheirs with her, including the eldest – Lady Margaret, Countess of Shrewsbury (d. 1468). Richard Neville succeeded in keeping the Warwick and Despenser estates intact. He also later became 6th Earl of Salisbury after the death of his father Richard Neville, 5th Earl of Salisbury, in 1460.

== Children's marriages ==
The Earl and Countess of Warwick had two daughters together, Isabel and Anne Neville, born in 1451 and 1456 respectively. Warwick was a close ally of his uncle, Richard of York, 3rd Duke of York, and assisted in his efforts in claiming the crown for the House of York during the early phases of the Wars of the Roses. After the Duke was killed in battle in 1460, Warwick was instrumental in placing York's son, Edward IV, on the throne in 1461, deposing the Lancastrian Henry VI, causing him to be known by the epithet of "Kingmaker". However, Warwick began to grow disillusioned with Edward IV's reign and defected to Lancaster, allying with Henry VI's wife Margaret of Anjou against Edward. Warwick briefly deposed Edward in 1470, but died on 14 April 1471 at the Battle of Barnet. The widowed Anne sought sanctuary in Beaulieu Abbey and wrote to the King to assure him that she was 'the kinge's true liege woman' and to negotiate her own safety. She also sent appeals to powerful women of the royal family, including Jacquetta of Luxembourg, Duchess of Bedford, Elizabeth Woodville and Elizabeth of York. She remained in sanctuary until 1473.

Her elder daughter, Isabel, had married Edward's brother George, Duke of Clarence, in 1469 as part of a deal between Warwick and Clarence against the King. Her younger daughter, Anne Neville, was married to Edward of Westminster, the only son of King Henry VI. When Edward of Westminster was killed in the Battle of Tewkesbury in 1471, Anne was remarried to Richard, Duke of Gloucester, the brother of Edward IV and George, Duke of Clarence, who later became King Richard III of England. They married after a dispensation to marry was issued from Rome on 22 April 1472. Anne joined her daughter Anne's household in 1473 after Richard obtained the king's permission to release his mother-in-law from her sanctuary. Anne is known to have passed an illustrated Book of Hours to her daughter, which had been commissioned by her father, the 13th Earl of Warwick.

Although their mother was still living, the husbands of the two Neville sisters fought over their inheritance. To win his brother George's final consent to the marriage with Anne, eventually Richard renounced most of Warwick's land and property including the earldoms of Warwick (which the Kingmaker had held in his wife's right) and Salisbury and surrendered to Clarence the office of Great Chamberlain of England. In 1474, to settle the dispute once and for all, Anne was declared legally dead by Parliament and her inheritance was divided between her two daughters.

Isabel died in childbirth in December 1476. After George was executed for treason in 1478 for again rebelling against his brother, the earldoms of Warwick and Salisbury were divided between two of Anne's grandsons; George's son by Isabel Neville, Edward Plantagenet, inherited the title of Earl of Warwick, while Richard's son by Anne Neville, Edward of Middleham, was styled Earl of Salisbury. The Countess lived to see her second daughter Anne become Queen of England upon Richard's accession to the throne in 1483, but the Queen died two years later in March 1485, just a few months before Richard's death at the Battle of Bosworth Field.

== Later life ==
Anne was once again in sanctuary at Beaulieu Abbey in 1486 when she petitioned Henry VII for the return of her estate. She recovered a small portion, but only on condition that she broke the entail and remit the bulk of them to Henry VII. "The 'Warwick and Spencer lands', her own patrimony became part of the crown estate."

Anne died in obscurity on 20 September 1492, aged 66, having survived her husband, her daughters and the sons-in-law who had effectively disinherited her. She was buried alongside her husband at Bisham Priory.

== Fictional portrayals ==
Anne, Countess of Warwick, appears prominently in the Philippa Gregory novels The White Queen (2009), The Red Queen (2010), and The Kingmaker's Daughter (2012), and is played by Juliet Aubrey in the 2013 television adaptation of all three novels, The White Queen. She is depicted as a coldly ambitious mother to Isabel and Anne Neville, and her husband's staunchest supporter.

A more sympathetic portrayal of the Countess of Warwick is in the novel The Sunne in Splendour by Sharon Kay Penman, and a maternal view of her is observed in The Reluctant Queen by Jean Plaidy.

Novelist Sandra Worth represents the Countess as her husband's conscience in her five novels about the Wars of the Roses. Another sympathetic portrayal of Anne Beauchamp is Wife to the Kingmaker, a 1974 title by Sandra Wilson.

Peerage of England
Preceded by Anne Beauchamp	Countess of Warwick; 1449–1492	Succeeded by Edward Plantagenet
