= Edward Despenser, 1st Baron Despenser =

English noble

Arms of Despencer.

Edward le Despenser, 1st Baron Despenser KG (24 March 1336, Essendine – 11 November 1375) was the son of another Edward le Despenser and Anne Ferrers, sister of Henry, Lord Ferrers of Groby. He succeeded as Lord of Glamorgan in 1349.

Le Despencer went with Edward the Black Prince to France, and was present at the Battle of Poitiers. In recognition of his conduct in the French wars, he was summoned to Parliament as a baron in 1357. At the same time, he also became a Knight of the Garter.

He was a friend and patron of Jean Froissart and the eldest brother of Henry le Despenser, Bishop of Norwich.

There is a statue of him on the top of the Holy Trinity Chantry Chapel in Tewkesbury Abbey, renowned as the "KNEELING KNIGHT".

== Family ==
Edward married Elizabeth de Burghersh, daughter of Bartholomew de Burghersh, 2nd Baron Burghersh. They had the following children:

- Margaret le Despencer (died 3 November 1415), married Robert de Ferrers, 5th Baron Ferrers of Chartley. They were ancestors to Queen Katherine Parr through their daughter Philippa
- Elizabeth le Despenser (died 10 or 11 April 1408)
  married
  (1) John FitzAlan, 2nd Baron Arundel (30 November 1364 – 14 August 1390)
  (2) William la Zouche, 3rd Baron Zouche
- Thomas le Despenser, 1st Earl of Gloucester (22 September 1373 – 13 January 1400), married Constance of York.
- Hugh Despenser
- Cicely Despenser
- Anne Despenser (died 30 October 1426) married (1) Hugh de Hastings and (2) Thomas de Morley, 4th Baron Morley

== Notes ==
Peerage of England
New creation	Baron le Despencer; 1357–1375	Succeeded by Thomas Despencer
