= Isabel Despenser, Countess of Warwick =

English noblewoman (1400–1439)

Isabel le Despencer
- Countess of Warwick and Worcester
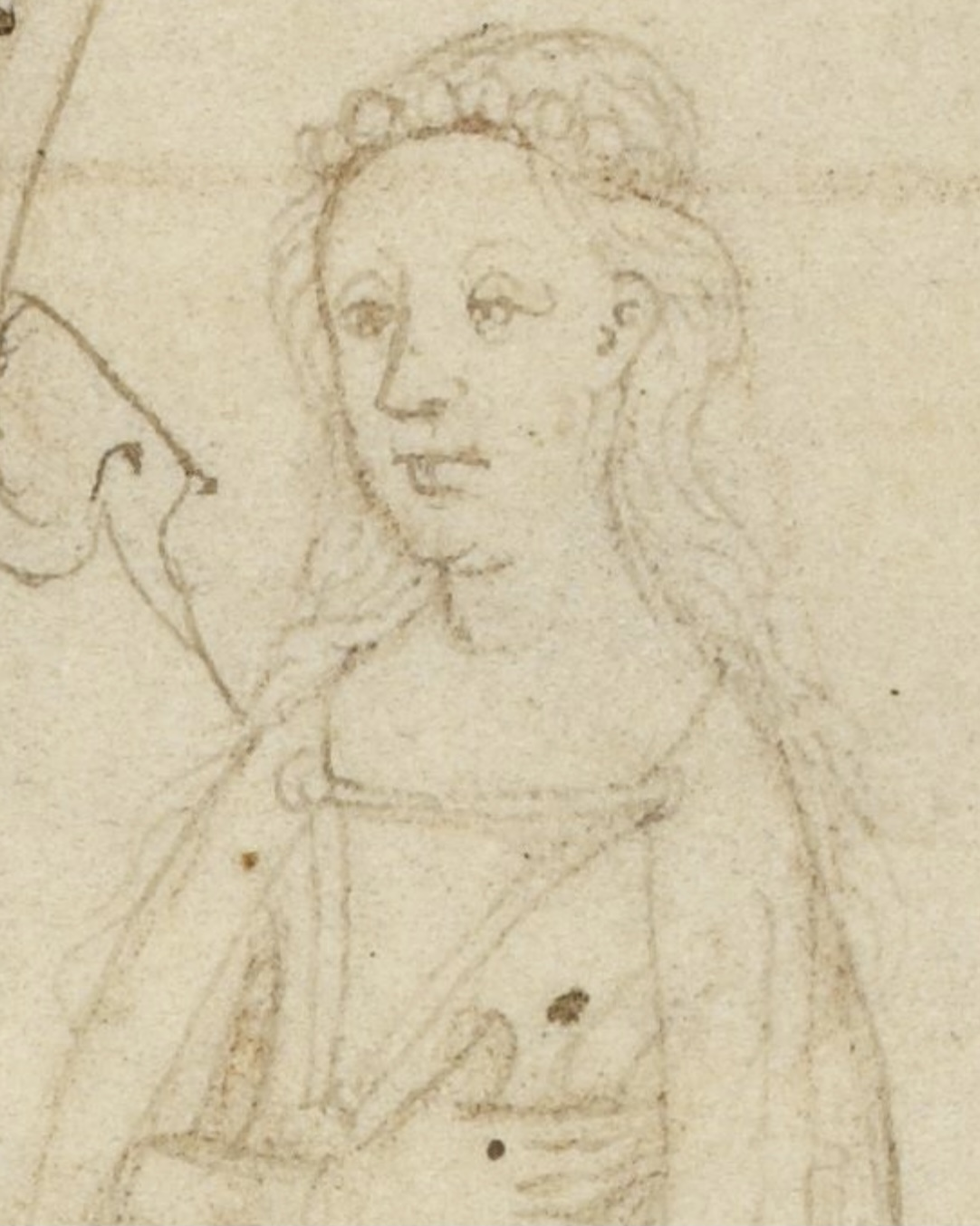
- Drawing of Isabel from the Beauchamp Pageant, c. 1483–1494

Baroness Burghersh
- Reign: 1414-27 December 1439
- Predecessor: Richard le Despencer, 4th Baron Burghersh
- Successor: Henry Beauchamp, 1st Duke of Warwick
- Born: 26 July 1400
- Died: 27 December 1439 (aged 39)
- Spouses: Richard Beauchamp, 1st Earl of Worcester; Richard Beauchamp, 13th Earl of Warwick
- Issue: Elizabeth Beauchamp, Baroness Bergavenny; Henry Beauchamp, 1st Duke of Warwick; Anne Beauchamp, 16th Countess of Warwick
- Father: Thomas Despenser, 1st Earl of Gloucester
- Mother: Constance of York

Isabel le Despenser, Countess of Worcester and Warwick, LG (26 July 1400 – 27 December 1439) was the posthumous daughter and eventually the sole heiress of Thomas le Despenser, 1st Earl of Gloucester by his wife, Constance of York, daughter of Edmund of Langley (son of King Edward III of England). She was born six months after her father had been beheaded for plotting against King Henry IV of England (1399–1413).

== Marriages and children ==
Isabel married twice, successively to two identically named first-cousins, grandsons of Thomas de Beauchamp, 11th Earl of Warwick:

1. Firstly to Richard de Beauchamp, 1st Earl of Worcester (1394–1422) who died at the Siege of Meaux. They had one daughter:
  1. Elizabeth de Beauchamp, born 1415, who married Edward Neville, 1st Baron Bergavenny (died 1476), and had children.
2. Secondly to Richard de Beauchamp, 13th Earl of Warwick (1382–1439), her 1st husband's first-cousin from a senior Beauchamp line, by whom she had two children:
  1. Henry de Beauchamp (1425–1446), who succeeded his father as 14th Earl of Warwick, and later was created 1st Duke of Warwick. He married Cecily Neville, daughter of Richard Neville, 5th Earl of Salisbury, and had by her one daughter Anne Beauchamp, 15th Countess of Warwick who died as a child.
  2. Anne de Beauchamp, who became 16th Countess of Warwick, following the deaths of her brother and his infant daughter. Anne married Richard Neville, the Kingmaker, eldest son of Richard Neville, 5th Earl of Salisbury, and who became jure uxoris 16th Earl of Warwick. Her husband therefore was the brother of her own brother's wife. They had two daughters who married at the highest level: Isabel Neville (1451–1476), who married George Plantagenet, 1st Duke of Clarence (1449–1478), and Anne Neville (1456–1485), who married firstly Edward of Westminster, Prince of Wales, and secondly King Richard III (1483–1485).
