= Cecily Neville, Duchess of Warwick =

English duchess

Lady Cecily Neville
- Duchess of Warwick; Countess of Worcester
- Born: c. 1425
- Died: 26 July 1450
- Noble family: House of Neville
- Spouses: Henry de Beauchamp, 1st Duke of Warwick m. 1434; dec. 1446; John Tiptoft, 1st Earl of Worcester m. 1449; wid. 1450
- Issue: Anne de Beauchamp, 15th Countess of Warwick
- Father: Richard Neville, 5th Earl of Salisbury
- Mother: Alice Montacute, 5th Countess of Salisbury

Cecily Neville, Duchess of Warwick, Countess of Worcester (c.1425 – 26 July 1450) was a daughter of Richard Neville, 5th Earl of Salisbury and Alice Montacute, 5th Countess of Salisbury. Her siblings included Richard Neville, 16th Earl of Warwick; John Neville, 1st Marquess of Montagu; George Neville, (Archbishop of York and Chancellor of England); Katherine Neville, Baroness Hastings; and Alice Neville, Baroness FitzHugh.

== Life ==
She was most likely named after her paternal aunt, Cecily Neville, Duchess of York. Her first cousins included Anne of York, Duchess of Exeter; Edmund, Earl of Rutland; Elizabeth of York, Duchess of Suffolk; Margaret of York; George Plantagenet, 1st Duke of Clarence; and Kings Edward IV and Richard III.

She first married Henry de Beauchamp, 1st Duke of Warwick, and the only King of the Isle of Wight (as well as of Jersey and Guernsey). Their only daughter was Lady Anne Beauchamp, who was allowed to succeed as suo jure 15th Countess of Warwick. Upon the death of the 15th Countess, the title was inherited by her paternal aunt, also named Lady Anne. Lady Anne married Cecily's brother, Richard Neville, who would become jure uxoris 16th Earl of Warwick.

Her second husband was John Tiptoft, 1st Earl of Worcester. They had no children.

She is buried with her first husband, the Duke of Warwick, in Tewkesbury Abbey.

== Ancestry ==
Ancestors of Cecily Neville, Duchess of Warwick

16. Ralph Neville, 2nd Baron Neville de Raby
8. John Neville, 3rd Baron Neville de Raby
17. Alice Audley
4. Ralph de Neville, 1st Earl of Westmorland
18. Henry de Percy, 2nd Baron Percy
9. Hon. Maud Percy
19. Idoine de Clifford
2. Richard Neville, 5th Earl of Salisbury
20. Edward III of England
10. John of Gaunt, 1st Duke of Lancaster
21. Philippa of Hainault
5. Lady Joan Beaufort
22. Payne Roet
11. Katherine Swynford
23.
1. Cecily Neville, Duchess of Warwick
24. John de Montacute, 1st Baron Montacute
12. John Montacute, 3rd Earl of Salisbury
25. Margaret de Monthermer, 3rd Baroness de Monthermer
6. Thomas Montacute, 4th Earl of Salisbury
26. Sir Adam Francis
13. Maud Francis
27. Alice Champneis
3. Alice Neville, 5th Countess of Salisbury
28. Thomas Holland, 1st Earl of Kent
14. Thomas Holland, 2nd Earl of Kent
29. Joan, Princess of Wales, 4th Countess of Kent
7. Lady Eleanor Holland
30. Richard Fitzalan, 10th Earl of Arundel
15. Lady Alice FitzAlan
31. Eleanor of Lancaster
