= Bartholomew Burghersh the younger =

English nobleman and soldier

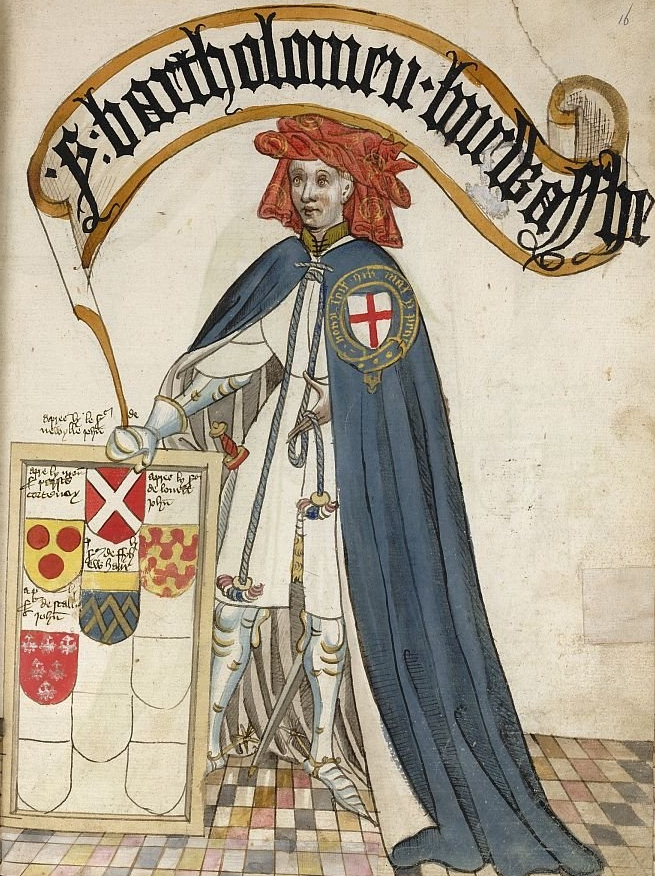

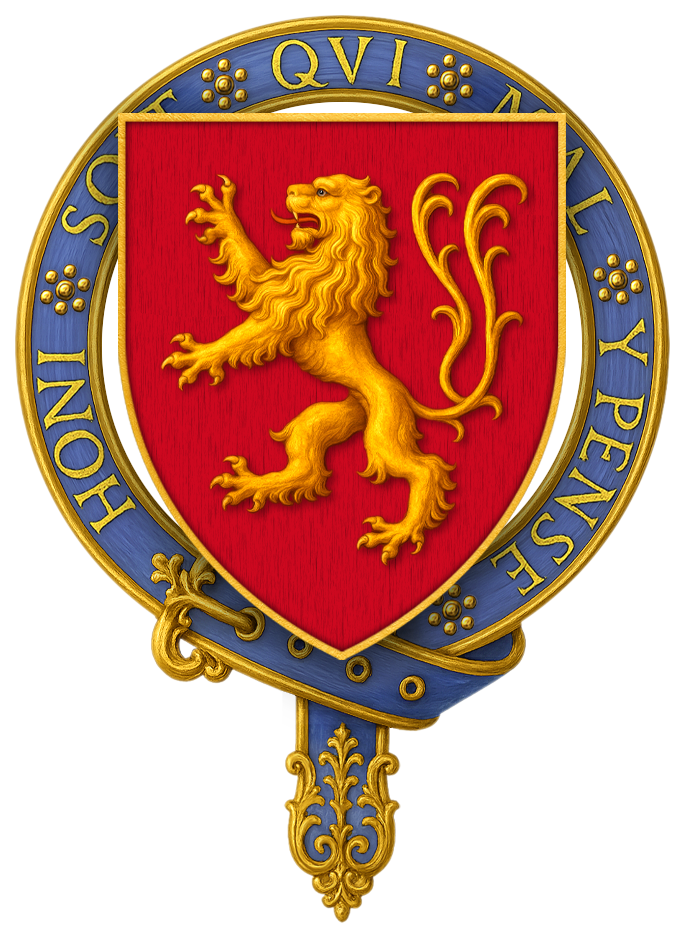
Arms of Sir Bartholomew de Burghersh, KG -- Gules a lion rampant double-queued or

Bartholomew Burghersh, 2nd Baron Burghersh KG (bef. 1329 – 5 April 1369), called 'the younger', was an English nobleman and soldier.

== Life ==
He was the son of Bartholomew Burghersh the elder, adopted his father's profession of arms and rivalled him in military distinction.

His recorded career begins in 1339, when he accompanied Edward III in his expedition to Flanders and took part in the first invasion of French territory. We find his name also as attending the king on his third inglorious and unprofitable campaign in Brittany in 1342–3. In 1346, he was one of the retinue of Edward the Black Prince, then in his fifteenth year, in the Battle of Crécy, and in the following year was present at the Siege of Calais, being rewarded for his distinguished services there by a rich wardship. In 1349, he was in the campaign in Gascony.

On the institution of the Order of the Garter in 1348, he was chosen to be one of the first knights companions. In 1354, he fulfilled a religious vow by taking a journey to the Holy Land.

On his return home, he joined the Black Prince in the expedition, in 1355. He was one of the most eminent of the commanders of the invading army, and had a leading share in the events of the campaign, especially in the Battle of Poitiers, 19 September 1356. A daring exploit of Burghersh is recorded by Froissart shortly before the battle. In company with Sir John Chandos and Sir James Audley, and attended by only four-and-twenty horsemen, he made an excursion from the main body of the army, and, falling on the rear of the French army, took thirty-two knights and gentlemen prisoners. His prowess and skill were again tried about the same time, when, on his return with a small foraging party at Romorantin near Berry, he was attacked from an ambuscade by a much more formidable force, which, however, he managed to keep at bay till relieved by the Black Prince. During this campaign his father, Lord Burghersh, died, and he received livery of his lands as his heir.

In 1359, he again accompanied Edward III on his last and most formidable invasion of France, ending in the decisive treaty of Brétigny, 8 May 1360. He was deputed to aid in the negotiation of this treaty between 'the firstborn sons of the kings of England and France' at Chartres, for which letters of protection were given him. He and his brother commissioners were taken prisoners in violation of the bond, and Edward had to interpose to obtain their liberation. During this campaign Knighton records his successful siege of the castle of Sourmussy in Gascony, in which he appears to have evidenced no common skill.

In 1362, he was appointed one of the commissioners on the state of Ireland. When, in 1364, King John II of France, to make atonement for the Louis I, Duke of Anjou's breach of faith, determined to yield himself back to captivity, to die three months alter his Landing at the Savoy Palace, Burghersh was one of the nobles deputed to receive him at Dover and conduct him by Canterbury to Edward's presence at Eltham. In 1366, he was one of the commissioners sent to Urban V, who had rashly demanded the payment of the arrears of the tribute granted by King John.

His death took place in 1369. By his desire, he was buried in the lady chapel of Walsingham Abbey.

== Family ==
He married before 10 May 1335, Cecily de Weyland, by whom he had one daughter:

- Elizabeth Burghersh (c. 1342–1409), suo jure Baroness Burghersh, she married Edward le Despencer, 1st Baron le Despencer before December 1364.

After the death of Cecily, he married Margaret Gisors, by whom he had no children.

== Notes ==
Attribution

This article incorporates text from a publication now in the public domain: Venables, Edmund (1886). "Burghersh, Bartholomew (d.1369)". In Stephen, Leslie (ed.). Dictionary of National Biography. Vol. 7. London: Smith, Elder & Co.

Peerage of England
Preceded by Bartholomew Burghersh	Baron Burghersh; 1355–1369	Succeeded by Elizabeth Burghersh; Edward Despenser
