= Eleanor de Clare =

Anglo-Welsh noblewoman (1292–1337)

- Suo jure Lady of Glamorgan
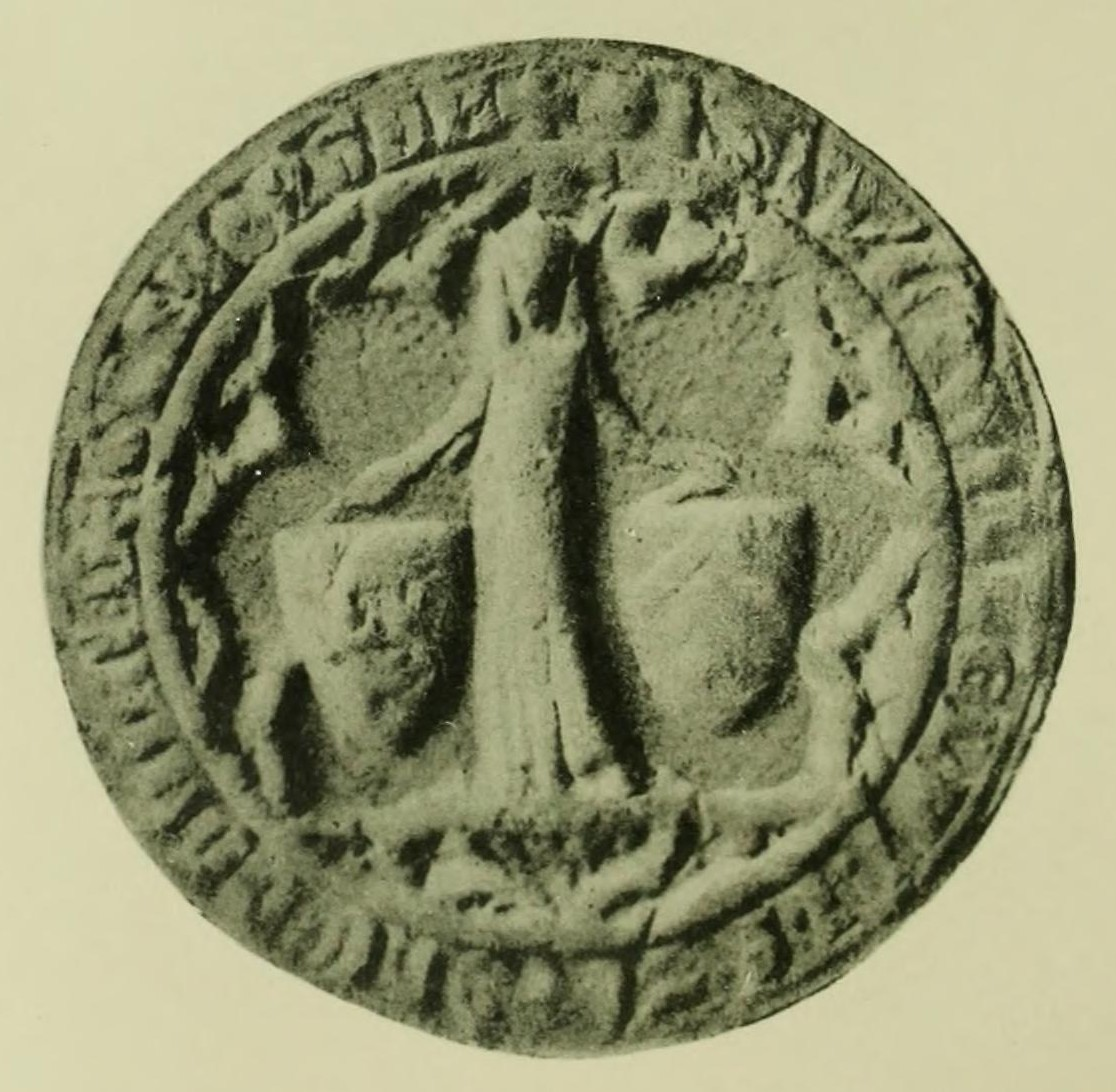
- Eleanor de Clare
- Other titles: Baroness le Despenser; Baroness la Zouche
- Born: 3 October 1292; Caerphilly Castle, Glamorgan, Wales
- Died: 30 June 1337 (age 44); Monmouth Castle, Monmouthshire, Wales
- Buried: Tewkesbury Abbey; 51.9903°N 2.1604°W
- Noble family: de Clare
- Spouses: Hugh le Despenser the Younger (m. 1306; died 1326) William la Zouche (m. 1329)
- Issue: Hugh le Despenser, Baron le Despenser; Edward le Despenser; Isabel le Despenser, Countess of Arundel; Joan le Despenser; Gilbert le Despenser; John le Despenser; Eleanor le Despenser; Margaret le Despenser; Elizabeth le Despenser, Baroness Berkeley; William la Zouche
- Father: Gilbert de Clare, 7th Earl of Gloucester
- Mother: Joan of Acre

Eleanor de Clare, suo jure 6th Lady of Glamorgan (October 1292 – 30 June 1337) was a powerful Anglo-Welsh noblewoman who married Hugh Despenser the Younger, the future favourite of Edward II of England, and was a granddaughter of Edward I of England. With her sisters, Elizabeth de Clare and Margaret de Clare, she inherited her father's estates after the death of her brother, Gilbert de Clare, 8th Earl of Gloucester, 7th Earl of Hereford at the Battle of Bannockburn in 1314. She was born in 1292 at Caerphilly Castle in Glamorgan, Wales and was the eldest daughter of Gilbert de Clare, 6th Earl of Hertford, 7th Earl of Gloucester, 5th Lord of Glamorgan and Princess Joan of Acre.

== De Clare inheritance ==
As a co-heiress with her sisters Elizabeth de Clare (wife of Roger d'Amory), and Margaret de Clare (wife of Hugh Audley), in 1314 she inherited the de Clare estates including the huge feudal barony of Gloucester, following the death of her brother Gilbert at Bannockburn. The partition was not fully settled until 1317. During this period the family seat of Caerphilly Castle was held by the king under the stewardship of Payn de Turberville of Coity Castle. In protest against Turberville's mistreatment, the Welsh nobleman Llywelyn Bren and his supporters launched a surprise attack on 28 January 1316, and besieged Caerphilly Castle, which successfully held out under the command of "The lady of Clare" (almost certainly Eleanor) and a small garrison until relieved by Sir William Montacute on 12 March 1316.

== Marriage to Hugh Despenser the younger ==
In May 1306 at Westminster, Eleanor married Hugh le Despenser the Younger, the son of Hugh le Despenser, Earl of Winchester by his wife Isabella de Beauchamp, daughter of William de Beauchamp, 9th Earl of Warwick. Despenser thereby became Lord of Glamorgan. Her grandfather, King Edward I, granted Eleanor a dowry of 2,000 pounds sterling. Eleanor's husband rose to prominence as the new favourite of her uncle, King Edward II of England. The king strongly favoured Hugh and Eleanor, visiting them often and granting them many gifts.

Eleanor's fortunes changed drastically after the invasion in September 1326 of Edward's estranged wife, Queen Isabella, and her lover, Roger Mortimer, who overthrew the King; two months later, her husband Hugh was convicted of high treason and subsequently hanged, drawn, and quartered.

=== Issue ===
By Despenser Eleanor had nine children:

1. Hugh le Despenser (c. 1308/9 – 8 February 1349), Baron le Despenser, who was summoned to Parliament in 1338. At his death without issue, his nephew Edward, son of his brother Edward, was created Baron le Despenser in 1357.
2. Edward le Despenser (c. 1310 – 30 September 1342), soldier, killed at the siege of Vannes. By his wife Anne Ferrers he was the father of Edward Despenser, Knight of the Garter, who became Baron le Despenser in a new creation of 1357.
3. Isabel le Despenser, Countess of Arundel (c. 1312 – aft. 1356), married, as his 1st wife, Richard Fitzalan, 10th Earl of Arundel. The marriage was annulled and their child, Edmund, was disinherited.
4. Joan le Despenser (c. 1314 – 15 November 1384), nun at Shaftesbury Abbey
5. Gilbert le Despenser (c. 1316 – April 1382).
6. John le Despenser (c. 1317 – June 1366).
7. Eleanor le Despenser (c. 1319 – February 1351), nun at Sempringham Priory
8. Margaret le Despenser (c. August 1323 – 1337), nun at Whatton Priory
9. Elizabeth le Despenser (c. December 1325 – 13 July 1389), married Maurice de Berkeley, 4th Baron Berkeley.

== Imprisonment ==
Despite being heavily pregnant, Eleanor was briefly made Constable of the Tower of London in October 1326, the only woman to ever hold this position, as King Edward II and her husband fled the London Uprising.

A month later, Eleanor was compelled to hand over custody of the Tower by the citizens of London and she was subsequently confined there. The Despenser family's fortunes also suffered with the executions of Eleanor's husband and father-in-law. Eleanor and Hugh's eldest son Hugh (1308–1349), who held Caerphilly Castle against the queen's forces until the spring of 1327, was spared his life when he surrendered the castle, but he remained a prisoner until July 1331, after which he was eventually restored to royal favour. Three of Eleanor's daughters were forcibly veiled as nuns. Only the eldest daughter, Isabel, and the youngest daughter, Elizabeth, escaped the nunnery, Isabel because she was already married and Elizabeth on account of her infancy. In February 1328 Eleanor was freed from imprisonment. In April 1328, she was restored to possession of her own lands, for which she did homage.

== Marriage to William de la Zouche ==
Arms of la Zouche: Gules, ten bezants 4, 3, 2, 1

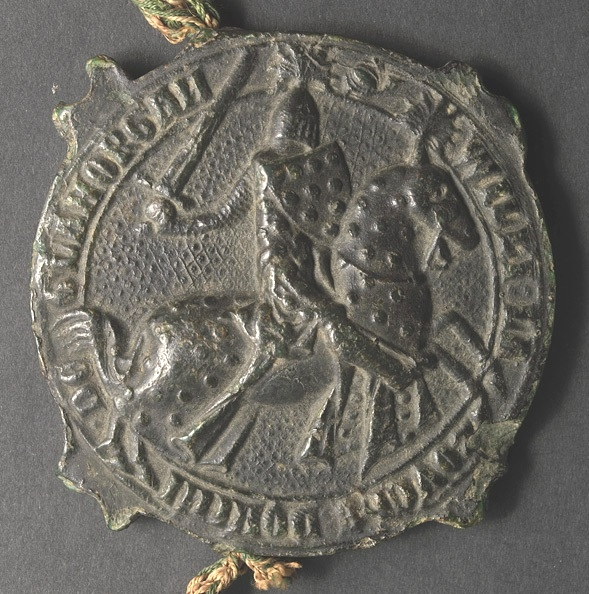
1329 seal of William la Zouche, 1st Baron Zouche of Mortimer (died 1337), jure uxoris Lord of Glamorgan, husband of Eleanor de Clare (1292–1337), daughter and eventual heiress of Gilbert de Clare, 6th Earl of Hertford, 7th Earl of Gloucester, Lord of Glamorgan and feudal baron of Gloucester. Inscribed: S(igillum) Will(elm)i La Zouche Domini De Glamorgan ("Seal of William la Zouche, Lord of Glamorgan"). His shield and the caparison of his horse show the Zouche arms bezantée

In January 1329 Eleanor was abducted from Hanley Castle by William la Zouche, 1st Baron Zouche of Mortimer, who had been one of her first husband's captors and who had led the siege of Caerphilly Castle. The abduction may in fact have been an elopement; in any case, Eleanor's lands were seized by King Edward III, and the couple's arrest was ordered. At the same time, Eleanor was accused of stealing jewels from the Tower of London. Sometime after February 1329, she was imprisoned a second time in the Tower, and was later moved to Devizes Castle. In January 1330 she was released and pardoned after agreeing to sign away the most valuable part of her share of the lucrative Clare inheritance to the crown. She could recover her lands only on payment of the enormous sum of 50,000 pounds in a single day.

Within the year, however, the young Edward III (Eleanor's first cousin) overthrew Queen Isabella's paramour, Roger Mortimer, 1st Earl of March, and had him executed. Eleanor was among those who benefited from the fall of Mortimer and Isabella. She petitioned Edward III for the restoration of her lands, claiming that she had signed them away after being threatened by Roger Mortimer that she would never be freed if she did not. In 1331 Edward III granted her petition "to ease the king's conscience" and allowed her to recover the lands on the condition that she should pay a fine of 10,000 pounds, later reduced to 5,000 pounds, in instalments. Eleanor made part-payments of the fine, but the bulk of it was outstanding at her death.

Eleanor's troubles were by no means over, however. After Eleanor's marriage to Zouche, John de Grey, 1st Baron Grey de Rotherfield claimed that he had married her first. In 1333 Grey was still attempting to claim marriage to Eleanor; the case was appealed to the Pope several times. Ultimately, Zouche won the dispute and Eleanor remained with him until his death in February 1337, only a few months before Eleanor's own death. By Zouche Eleanor had one child:

1. William de la Zouche, born 1330, died after 1360, a monk at Glastonbury Abbey.

== Tewkesbury Abbey Renovations ==
Hugh le Despenser the younger and Eleanor are generally credited with having begun the renovations to Tewkesbury Abbey, a foundation of her ancestors, which transformed it into one of the finest examples of the decorated style of architecture surviving today. The famous fourteenth-century stained-glass windows in the choir, which include the armour-clad figures of Eleanor's ancestors, brother and two husbands, were most likely Eleanor's own contribution, although she probably did not live to see them put in place. The naked kneeling woman watching the Last Judgment in the choir's east window may represent Eleanor.

== Ancestry ==
Ancestors of Eleanor de Clare

8.Gilbert de Clare, 4th Earl of Hertford
4.Richard de Clare, 5th Earl of Hertford
9. Isabel Marshal
2.Gilbert de Clare, 6th Earl of Hertford
10. John de Lacy, 1st Earl of Lincoln
5.Maud de Lacy
11. Margaret de Quincy
1. Eleanor de Clare
12. Henry III of England
6.Edward I of England
13. Eleanor of Provence
3.Joan of Acre
14. Ferdinand III of Castile
7. Eleanor of Castile
15. Joan, Countess of Ponthieu

== Fictional portrayals ==
Eleanor is a supporting character in Les Rois maudits (The Accursed Kings), a series of French historical novels by Maurice Druon. She was portrayed by Florence Dunoyer in the 1972 French miniseries adaptation of the series, and by Angèle Humeau in the 2005 adaptation.

Eleanor features in the 1975/1976 two-part novel, Feudal Family: The De Clares of Gloucester, by Edith Beadle Brouwer. She is the heroine of Susan Higginbotham's 2005 historical novel The Traitor's Wife: A Novel of the Reign of Edward II.
