= Edward Despenser =

Edward Despenser may refer to:

- Edward Despenser (died 1342) (1310–1342)
- Edward Despenser, 1st Baron Despenser (1336–1375), his son
