= Hugh Despenser (died 1374) =

14th century English nobleman

- Arms of Despenser
- Born: c. 1337/8
- Died: 2 March 1374; Padua, Italy
- Wars and battles: Hundred Years' War; Battle of Pontvallain (POW)
- Spouse(s): Alice Hotham
- Issue: Hugh Despenser; Anne Despenser
- Father: Edward le Despenser
- Mother: Anne Ferrers

Hugh Despenser (c. 1337/8 – 2 March 1374) was an English soldier and knight.

== Biography ==
Hugh was the second son of Edward Despenser and Anne Ferrers.

While with an English force in northwest France in 1370 and was captured during an action. He died on 2 March 1374 at Padua, Veneto, Italy.

== Marriage and issue ==
Hugh married Alice, daughter of John Hotham, they had the following issue.

- Hugh Despenser (died 1401), without issue.
- Anne Despenser, married Edward le Boteler, had issue.
