= Llywelyn Bren =

Welsh nobleman and rebel (died 1317)

- Born: Llywelyn ap Gruffudd ap Rhys c. 1260s?/1280s? Wales
- Died: c. 1317?/1318? Cardiff Castle, Wales
- Cause of death: Hanging, drawing, and quartering
- Burial place: Greyfriars, Cardiff; 51°28′59″N 3°10′39″W
- Military career
- Relatives: Lords of Afan
- Allegiance: Principality of Wales; House of Senghenydd
- Service years: 28 Janunary – 18 March 1316
- Conflicts: Revolt against the English in Wales
- Other work: Constable
- Spouse: Lleucu
- Children: 7 or 8?

Llywelyn Bren (c. 1260s – c. 1317), or Llywelyn ap Gruffudd ap Rhys or in English: Llywelyn of the Woods. He was a nobleman who led a 1316 revolt in Wales against the English (Anglo Normans). It marked the last serious challenge to English rule in Wales until the attempts of Owain Lawgoch to invade with French support in the 1370s. Hugh Despenser the Younger's reputedly unlawful execution of Llywelyn Bren helped to lead to the eventual overthrow of both Edward II and Hugh.

== Lineage ==
Llywelyn Bren was a Welsh nobleman of the minor royal house of the cantref of Senghenydd, and Miscin, and was also a descendant of Ifor Bach, his great-grandfather of the Deheubarth dynasty in medieval Wales. (Note: Senghenydd, previously called Welsh: Cantref Breiniol) His father was Gruffudd ap Rhys, and he educated his son Llylweyn to speak three languages, being: Middle Welsh, French (Anglo-Norman) and Latin. Llywelyn is thought to have been born in the 1260s, (Note: Sometime before 1267) his father Gruffudd was dispossessed of the lordship of Senghenydd in that year by Gilbert de Clare, 7th Earl of Gloucester and then imprisoned in Kilkenny Castle, Ireland. There is no record of him returning to Wales. Llywelyn married Lleucu (died 1349) sometime in the 1280s or 1290s. They produced at least seven sons, who also took part in the revolt. In adolescence, Bren was a landowner and the constable of Senghenydd who supervised the Beadles for the English Crown. Listed among Llywelyn's possessions in 1317 was a manuscript of the Roman de la Rose, the only one we know of in fourteenth-century Wales.

== Background of the revolt ==
Map of the South Wales Region

Before the outbreak of Llywelyn's revolt in 1316, there had already been violence in the Welsh Marcher lands of south-east Wales. The Battle of Bannockburn in June 1314 marked the death of Gilbert de Clare, 8th Earl of Gloucester the Lord of Glamorgan. He had been the most prominent landowner in the south and his death left a regional power vacuum after over 50 years of controlling the area Gwynllwg. With the losses amongst the 5,000 English army, roughly 500 Welshmen were of Glamorgan at Bannockburn, it caused a revolt in the lordship in late summer that year, from June or July until September. (Note: Llywelyn seems not to have taken part.) The revolt appears to have ended when King Edward II of England appointed Bartholomew de Badlesmere, as royal custodian in Glamorgan.

== Revolt and siege of Caerphilly Castle ==
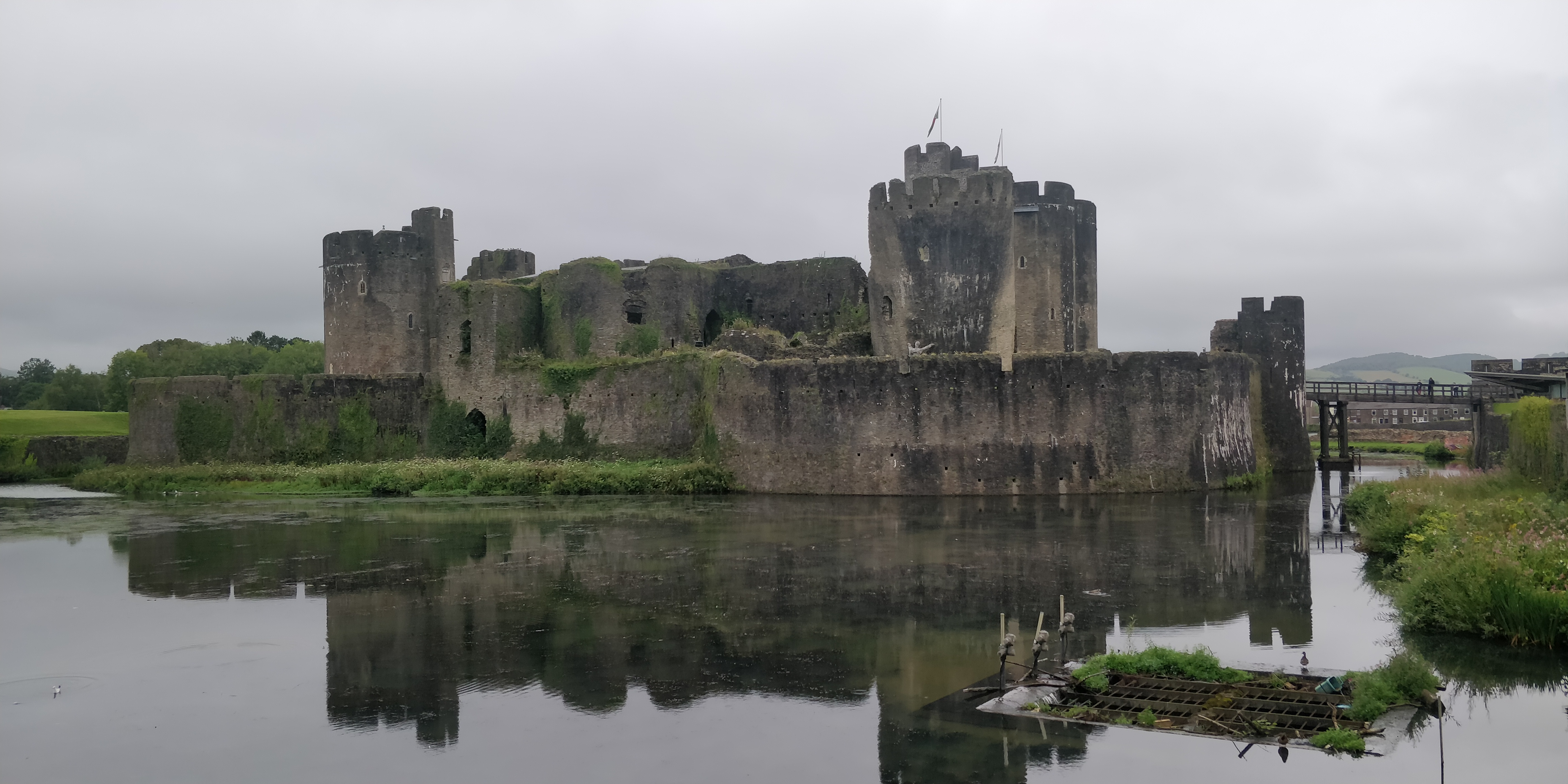
Caerphilly Castle in South Wales

On 8 July 1315, Edward II, as guardian of the three sisters and heiresses of the estate of Gilbert de Clare, 8th Earl of Gloucester, replaced de Badlesmere with a new English administrator. Payn de Turberville of Coity Castle was appointed as replacement (Latin: custos) to Earl de Clare. Bren had previously had office under the Earl whom he considered a friend. Payn persecuted the Glamorgan people, who were then, like many in northern Europe at the time, in the throes of a serious famine which lasted three years.

Llywelyn denounced the new administration of de Turberville, however he was accused of sedition. Llywelyn then appealed to King Edward II to call off or control his self-interested agent. But Edward ordered Llywelyn to appear before Parliament to face the treason charge to which Tuberville accused Bren of. The king stated that if the charges were found true, Llywelyn would be hanged. Bren was called "Son of death" by the King of England, and summoned to Lincoln for 27 January 1316, but secretly fled home, and had no problems starting a revolt with the general discontent throughout Wales.

After returning to Wales, Llywelyn's revolt begun on 28 January 1316 with a surprise attack on Caerphilly Castle. With 10,000 Welshmen and his six sons, Bren went against Turberville and the English administration. He captured the Constable outside the castle and he and his men captured the outer ward, but could not break into the inner defences of the castle. They burned the town, killed some of its townsfolk and started a siege. The revolt quickly spread through Glamorgan in the west to Rumney in the east of South Wales. Kenfig Castle was sacked, as was that of Llantrisant, and several others were attacked, including St Georges-super-Ely and Dinefwr Castle, amongst other places, including Llangybi (Llangibby), which was recorded to have been repaired around 1315/16. Towns including Cardiff were raided and buildings burned. Edward ordered the revolt to be crushed by Humphrey de Bohun, 4th Earl of Hereford and lord of neighbouring Brecon, who gathered overwhelming forces supported by men of the chief Marcher Lords like Henry of Lancaster and Roger Mortimer of Chirk Castle. In March, forces advanced from Cardiff and in a brief battle at Castell Morgraig where his forces potentially had a base hidden in the uplands, they forced Llywelyn and his men to break off the Caerphilly siege. English troops came from Cheshire and north Wales, and some Welsh soldiers from west Wales. The Welsh retreated higher up the north Glamorgan plateau, while Hereford and his men were moving south from Brecon.

== Betrayal and death ==
Realising the fight was hopeless, on 18 March 1316 Llywelyn surrendered to the Earl of Hereford at Ystradfellte. Llywelyn had gathered his forces in the hills and told them the revolt was his fault and he would surrender; he pleaded that only he should be punished and his followers spared. The Monk of Malmesbury Abbey forced Bren to say:

"It is not safe to engage the English. I was the cause of the whole. I will yield myself up for the whole people. It is better that one should die than that the whole nation be banished, or put to sword."

Hereford and Mortimer both promised to try to intercede on Llywelyn's behalf, and promised him "leniency." Llywelyn was sent as a prisoner first to London in July 1316, and the Tower of London from 27 July 1316 to 17 June 1317. Bren's gallant behaviour earned him the respect of his captors, including Roger Mortimer, one of the witnesses to his surrender as well as Hereford, they urged the King to pardon Llywelyn and his family, and it seems likely that their influence won a pardon for many of Llywelyn's men.

In 1317, Llywelyn became the prisoner of the ruthless Hugh Despenser the Younger, one of King Edward's favourites at court, who had become Lord of Glamorgan in November 1317. This made him the largest landowner in South Wales and a great rival of Mortimer. He took Llywelyn to Cardiff Castle, where he was reported to have had him hanged, drawn and quartered in what was characterised by contemporaries as an extrajudicial killing. Despenser's father, Hugh Despenser the Elder, was also accused of involvement in this act at the parliament which demanded the exile of both men in 1321. However, historian Kathryn Warner has claimed that Llywelyn's execution was most likely carried out "at the command of the king himself". He was buried in the Greyfriars at Cardiff. (Note: After parts of his body had been exhibited in various parts of the county.) Llywelyn's lands were seized by Despenser, (Note: This action was condemned at the time and later used as example of the growing tyranny of Despenser) who also imprisoned Lleucu and three of her sons firstly in London, then Bristol and finally in Cardiff. Then in May 1321, Despenser was convicted by the Crown and executed, and the Bren's family were released from custody.

== The aftermath ==
As antipathy to the Despensers grew, Llywelyn's death united the native Welsh and Marcher Lords. In 1321, a baronial revolt arose. Barons under the Earl of Hereford and others like Hugh Audley and Roger d'Amory petitioned the king to dismiss and exile the Despensers. (Note: The murder of Llywelyn Bren was prominent on their list of complaints.) When the king refused, an alliance of local Welsh men and Marcher Lords raided Despenser's lands in Glamorgan for some ten days. (Note: This may have been when Lleucu and her sons were freed – certainly Hereford took all of Llywelyn's sons into his service about that time.) Edward had to exile the Despensers until he gathered forces to defeat the barons at the Battle of Boroughbridge in 1322, where the Earl of Hereford died.

With the Despensers' return to Edward's court, Lleucu and her sons were again imprisoned, this time in Bristol Castle, but their actions soon aroused more resistance. In October 1326, a successful rebellion led by Roger Mortimer gave the Despensers and Edward further cause to regret their actions in Glamorgan after being forced to flee there. Their attempts to raise troops locally were an unsurprising failure. It led to their capture in November. Hugh, like Llywelyn, was then hanged, drawn and quartered; Edward was deposed, imprisoned, and probably murdered.

With the overthrow of Edward II, the estates in Senghenydd were restored on 11 February 1327 to Llywelyn Bren's sons – Gruffydd, John, Meurig, Roger, William and Llywelyn. The Earls of Hereford continued to pay at Brecon an allowance to their mother Lleucu until 12 April 1349 when she likely died, whilst their sons were deprived of the family lands until after the deposition of Edward II, when they were given back from the Crown on 11 February 1327. However, the lands were dispersed and lost within a century, when little if any lands had remained in the possession of Bren's family.

== See also ==
- Owain Lawgoch
- Owain Glyndŵr
- Llywelyn II
- Madog ap Llywelyn
- Welsh rebellions against English rule
- List of rulers in Wales
- Wales in the Middle Ages
