= John of Nottingham =

14th-century English magician

- Occupation: Magician
- Known for: Plotting to kill Edward II

John of Nottingham was a 14th-century magician, said to have plotted to kill Edward II of England and Hugh Despenser the Younger in 1324 through witchcraft.

== Background ==
By 1324, Edward II was ruling England with his royal favourite Hugh Despenser the Younger in an increasingly despotic manner. Although Edward had defeated his Lancastrian opponents in 1322, many of his enemies had escaped to France from where they still conspired against Despenser and him. Already during 1324 there had been an attempt to murder the pair, although the conspiracy had been foiled.

== The conspiracy ==
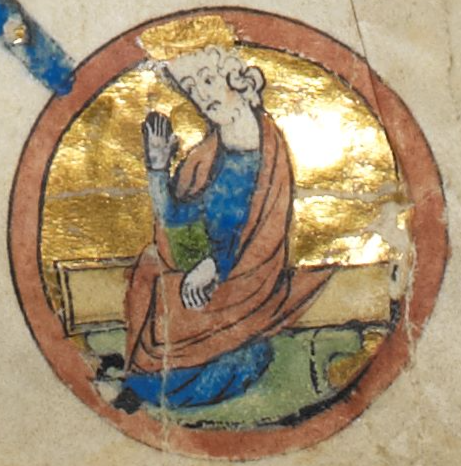
John of Nottingham was said to have been hired to kill the unpopular Edward II, shown here in a contemporary picture, and several of the king's key supporters with magic.

According to the case brought by the prosecution, twenty eight citizens of Coventry had become particularly discontented with the Prior of Coventry, who had been extracting considerable taxes from the city with the backing of the Despensers. In November 1323, they had approached John of Nottingham, a famous magician based in Coventry, to request his assistance in killing the King, Hugh Despenser and his father, along with the prior, using magic. John had set about doing this using necromantic ceremonies involving wax effigies of his targets. Using seven pounds of wax and two yards of cloth, John allegedly made effigies of the four main targets, the prior's unpopular caterer and his steward, along with one of Richard de Lowe, a local man on whom the magic was to be first tested. John was said to have worked with his assistant Robert Marshall in a deserted house just outside Coventry on the magical effigies, which he ultimately tested in 1324 by driving a lead pin first into the head, and then the heart of de Lowe's effigy; de Lowe apparently died as a result.

Unfortunately for John, his assistant Marshall then turned him in to the authorities, potentially as the result of a grievance against his master, before any further attacks could be made. The case against John and his sponsors came up before the King's Bench later in the year, in which the group were tried for the murder of de Lowe. They were found innocent by the jury.

== Consequences ==
Hugh Despenser became extremely concerned for his personal safety after this case. He wrote to Pope John XXII asking for his assistance in protecting him against magical attack. The Pope, who was not favourably inclined towards the Despensers, curtly advised him to "turn to God with his whole heart and make a good confession and such satisfaction as shall be enjoined. No other remedies are necessary beyond this general indulgence which the Pope grants him." The case added to the febrile atmosphere that led to the overthrow of Edward II and the Despensers two years later.

== Bibliography ==
- Doherty, Paul. (2003) Isabella and the Strange Death of Edward II. London: Robinson.
- Lea, Henry Charles. (2005) A History of the Inquisition of the Middle Ages, Volume 3. New York: Cosimo.
- Wright, Thomas. (1852) Narratives of sorcery and magic, from the most authentic sources. New York: Redfield.
