= Edward Despenser (died 1342) =

English noble

Edward le Despenser
- Arms of Despenser
- Born: c. 1310
- Died: 30 September 1342; Morlaix, Brittany
- Wars and battles: War of the Breton Succession; Battle of Morlaix †
- Spouse: Anne Ferrers
- Issue: Edward Despenser, 1st Baron Despenser; Hugh Despenser; Thomas le Despenser; Henry le Despenser, Bishop of Norwich
- Father: Hugh le Despenser the Younger
- Mother: Eleanor de Clare

Edward le Despenser (c. 1310 – 30 September 1342) was a son of Hugh le Despenser the Younger by his wife Eleanor de Clare. His father, a favourite of Edward II of England, was executed in 1326. Through his mother, he was a great-grandson of Edward I of England.

== Early life ==
Although his exact whereabouts before the execution of his father are unknown, it is believed that he was among the children living with their mother Eleanor during her imprisonment in the Tower of London (November 1326 – February 1328). He was clearly too young to be seen as a threat to Queen Isabella and her lover Roger Mortimer, unlike his older brother, Hugh (who was imprisoned by the two in 1327).

== Marriage and children ==
After coming into his estates in November 1334, he soon married Anne Ferrers of Groby (sister of Henry, Lord Ferrers). They had four surviving sons:

- Edward le Despenser, 1st Baron Despenser (1336–1375); inherited the Despenser estates from his paternal uncle Hugh.
- Hugh le Despenser (died 1374), married Alice Hotham, had issue.
- Thomas le Despenser
- Henry le Despenser, Bishop of Norwich

== Later life ==
Like a few of his brothers, Edward served in Edward III's military campaigns. In 1342, he accompanied his older brother Hugh to mainland Europe. Although they were originally heading for Gascony, they were diverted to Brest to aid King Edward's ally the Countess of Montfort in the Breton Civil War. On 30 September 1342, they helped achieve a victory against the French army at the Battle of Morlaix, but Edward was killed during the fighting.

== Ancestry ==
Ancestors of Edward Despenser (died 1342)

16. Hugh le Despenser
8. Hugh le Despencer, 1st Baron le Despencer
4. Hugh le Despenser, 1st Earl of Winchester
18. Philip Basset
9. Aline Bassett
19. Hawise de Louvain
2. Hugh Despenser the Younger
20. William de Beauchamp
10. William de Beauchamp, 9th Earl of Warwick
21. Isabel Mauduit
5. Isabella de Beauchamp
22. John Fitzgeoffrey
11. Maud FitzJohn
23. Isabel Bigod
1. Edward le Despenser
24. Gilbert de Clare, 4th Earl of Hertford
12. Richard de Clare, 5th Earl of Hertford
25. Isabel Marshal
6. Gilbert de Clare, 6th Earl of Hertford
26. John de Lacy, 1st Earl of Lincoln
13. Maud de Lacy
27. Margaret de Quincy, Countess of Lincoln
3. Eleanor de Clare
28. Henry III of England
14. Edward I of England
29. Eleanor of Provence
7. Joan of Acre
30. Ferdinand III of Castile
15. Eleanor of Castile
31. Joan of Ponthieu
