= Gilbert de Clare, 8th Earl of Gloucester =

English nobleman and military commander (1291–1314)

Gilbert de Clare
- List: 8th Earl of Gloucester; 7th Earl of Hertford; 10th Lord of Clare; 5th Lord of Glamorgan; 10th Lord of Tonbridge; 9th Lord of Cardigan
- Coat of Arms used by Gilbert de Clare.
- Predecessor: Gilbert de Clare, 6th Earl of Hertford
- Successor: Earldom of Gloucester was recreated and passed to Hugh de Audley, 1st Earl of Gloucester Husband of Margaret de Clare
- Born: c. 10 May 1291; Clare Castle, Suffolk, England
- Died: 24 June 1314 (aged 23); Bannockburn, Scotland
- Cause of death: Killed in battle
- Buried: Tewkesbury Abbey; 51.990252°N 2.160428°W
- Locality: East Anglia, Gloucestershire (England); Glamorgan (Wales)
- Wars and battles: Scottish Wars • Battle of Bannockburn
- Offices: Warden of Scotland, Captain of Scotland and the Northern Marches
- Noble family: de Clare
- Spouse: Maud de Burgh
- Parents: Gilbert de Clare, 7th Earl of Gloucester; Princess Joan of Acre

Gilbert de Clare, 8th Earl of Gloucester, 7th Earl of Hertford (c. 10 May 1291 – 24 June 1314) was an English nobleman and military commander in the Scottish Wars. In contrast to most English earls at the time, his main focus lay in the pursuit of war rather than in domestic political strife. He was the son of Gilbert de Clare, 7th Earl of Gloucester, and Joan of Acre, daughter of King Edward I. The older Gilbert died when his son was only four years old, and the younger Gilbert was invested with his earldoms at the young age of sixteen. Almost immediately, he became involved in the defense of the northern border, but later he was drawn into the struggles between Edward II and some of his barons. He was one of the Lords Ordainers who ordered the expulsion of the king's favourite Piers Gaveston in 1311. When Gaveston was killed on his return in 1312, Gloucester helped negotiate a settlement between the perpetrators and the king.

Now one of Edward's strongest supporters, Gloucester accompanied the king on a campaign to Scotland in 1314, when several other nobles refused. He was killed at the Battle of Bannockburn on 24 June 1314, under somewhat unclear circumstances. Gloucester was the most prominent of the casualties of the battle, which ended in a humiliating defeat for England. As he had no issue, his death marked the end of the prominent de Clare family. His estates were divided between his three sisters, one of whom was married to the king's new favourite, Hugh Despenser the younger. Despenser's ruthless expansion of the de Clare Lordship of Glamorgan in Wales led directly to the troubles of Edward II's later reign, including a rebellion in the Welsh Marches, the defeat of the Earl of Lancaster at the Battle of Boroughbridge, and eventually, the deposition of the king by Roger Mortimer and Queen Isabella in 1326.

== Family background and early life ==
Gilbert de Clare was the son of Gilbert de Clare, 7th Earl of Gloucester – known as Gilbert 'the Red' – who in 1290 married Joan of Acre, daughter of Edward I. As a condition for the marriage, the earl had to surrender all his lands to the king, only to have them returned jointly to himself and his wife for the lifetime of either. This grant was made on the condition that the lands would pass to the couple's joint heirs, but if they were childless to Joan's heirs from any later marriages. The younger Gilbert was born the next year, around 10 May 1291, securing the inheritance for the de Clare family, but his father died only four years later, on 7 December 1295, while the boy was still a minor. Because of the joint enfeoffment, Joan kept the custody of the family lands and did homage to the king on 20 January the next year.

After the elder de Clare's death, Joan secretly married Ralph de Monthermer in 1297. De Monthermer was a squire in the late earl's household. This enraged Edward I, who had other marriage plans for Joan. The king imprisoned Monthermer, but later relented, and sanctioned the marriage after Joan pled for her lover to be elevated to a knight. Because of the previous settlement, Joan was still titled countess, and her new husband became Earl of Gloucester and Hertford. This, however, only lasted for the life of Joan, who died in 1307. Only a few months later, Gilbert the younger was granted his inheritance, and by March 1308 was made Earl of Gloucester and Hertford at the young age of sixteen.^{[a]} This grant was made by his materinal uncle King Edward II, who succeeded his father King Edward I in July 1307. It was previously believed that Edward II and Gilbert were brought up together, but this is based on confusion with another person of the same name. This other Gilbert de Clare, who was closer to the king in age, was in fact the earl's cousin, the son of Thomas de Clare, Lord of Thomond.

== Early service under Edward II ==
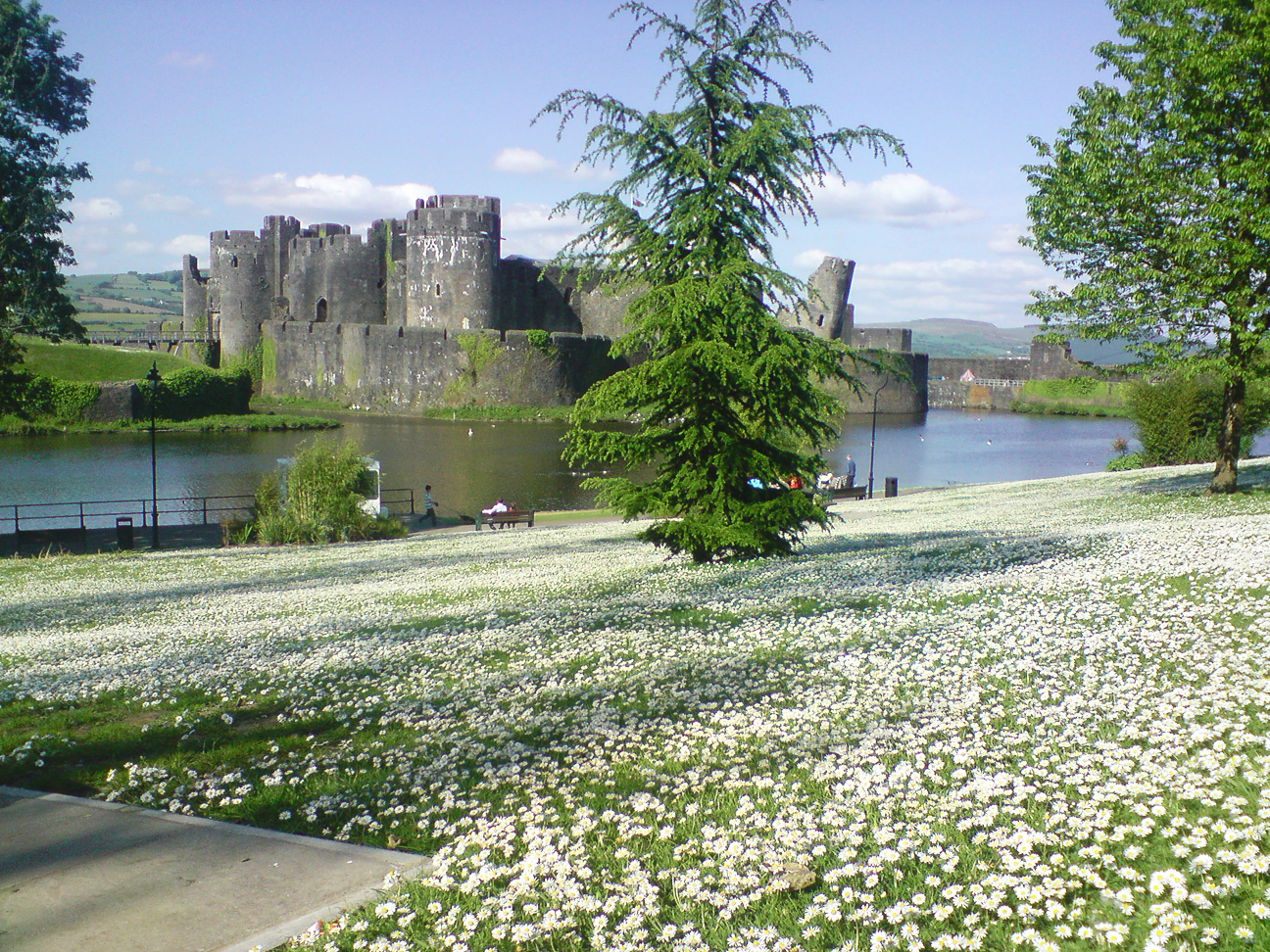
Caerphilly Castle in the Welsh Marches, Gloucester's main residence, was built by his father, Gilbert 'the Red'.

Gilbert's first years as earl were predominantly concerned with the Scottish Wars. He had no personal interest in the region, but the Welsh Marches, where his landed interest lay, were largely pacified at the time, and Scotland presented a good opportunity to pursue military glory and reward. He was almost immediately trusted with important military commands on the northern border, and served as warden of Scotland from 1308 to 1309, and as captain of Scotland and the northern marches in 1309. He led an expedition to relieve the castle of Rutherglen in December 1308. The war effort, however, was not pursued with the same intensity by Edward II as it had been by his father. The new king's neglect of the Scottish Wars allowed Robert the Bruce to regain the initiative in the war.

This situation led to frustration among the English nobility. In addition to the Scottish issue, there was also discontent with the king's treatment of his favourite, Piers Gaveston. Gaveston's promotion from relative obscurity to Earl of Cornwall, combined with his arrogant behaviour, caused resentment among the established nobility. Gloucester was initially not hostile to Gaveston, who had married Gloucester's sister Margaret in October 1307. He did, however, share in the other earls' frustration with Edward's lack of initiative towards Scotland. In 1308, therefore, Gloucester was among the earls who demanded Gaveston's exile, a demand the king was forced to meet. After this, he seems to have been reconciled with the king, and in 1309 he acted as a mediator when the earls agreed to Gaveston's return. Relations between the king and the nobility deteriorated even further, however, after Gaveston's return. In 1310, a group of so-called Lords Ordainers were appointed to draft the Ordinances of 1311, a set of restrictions on the rule of Edward II, including a renewed exile for Gaveston. Gloucester, who was still a supporter of the king, was not initially among the Ordainers, but was appointed on 4 March 1311, upon the death of the Earl of Lincoln.

== Escalation of the national conflict ==
My lord earl, the wrong done to you is not to be blamed on Earl Guy, for he did what he did with our support and counsel; and if, as you say, you have pledged your lands, you have lost them anyhow. It only remains to advise you to learn another time to negotiate more cautiously.

— A letter from Gloucester to the earl of Pembroke, quoted in the Vita Edwardi Secundi.

In spite of his participation in the baronial reform movement, Gloucester still maintained the trust of the king. He, Gaveston and the Earl of Warenne were the only earls to accompany the king on a Scottish campaign in 1310–11. In March 1311, while the Ordinances were still in the workings, Gloucester was appointed guardian of the realm while the king was still in Scotland. There are signs that he might have fallen out with Thomas, Earl of Lancaster – who was at this point the leader of the opposition against the king – over a feud between two of their respective retainers. When Gaveston once more returned from exile, however, Gloucester sided with the baronial opposition. The earls divided the country into different parts for defence, and Gloucester was given charge of the south. In June 1312, Gaveston was captured by Guy de Beauchamp, Earl of Warwick, who was working in cooperation with Lancaster. Aymer de Valence, Earl of Pembroke, who had the custody of Gaveston and had guaranteed his safety to the king, appealed to Gloucester, as Gaveston's kinsman, for assistance. Gloucester, however, refused to help, and Gaveston was killed. This act brought the country to the brink of civil war, and Gloucester was one of the few men who was still trusted enough by both sides to be able to take on a role as mediator. In the following months, he was among the main negotiators working towards an agreement between the king and the offending earls, an effort that was at least temporarily successful.

Gloucester remained in the inner circle around the king over the next months. In the summer of 1313, he was again guardian of the realm while the king was in France, and in February 1314, he was sent to France on a diplomatic mission regarding Gascony. The greatest problem of the reign, however, remained the unresolved conflict with Scotland, and the resurgence of Robert the Bruce. In the summer of 1314, Edward finally embarked on a major Scottish campaign. The objective was to protect the English garrison at Stirling Castle from an attack by Bruce. The campaign was impeded by the absence of some of the greater magnates, such as Lancaster and Warwick. There were still a number of great lords in the king's company, including Humphrey de Bohun, Earl of Hereford, Pembroke and Gloucester. These men were valuable to the king for their ability to raise large numbers of troops from their dominions in the Welsh Marches. On 23 June 1314, the royal army had passed Falkirk and was within a few miles of Stirling. There were, however, signs of strife between the earls of Gloucester and Hereford. Gloucester had been given the command of the English vanguard, a position he had earned through his loyalty to the king. Yet Hereford, who had been placed under Gloucester's command, believed the command belonged to him, in his capacity of hereditary Constable of England.

== Death at Bannockburn ==
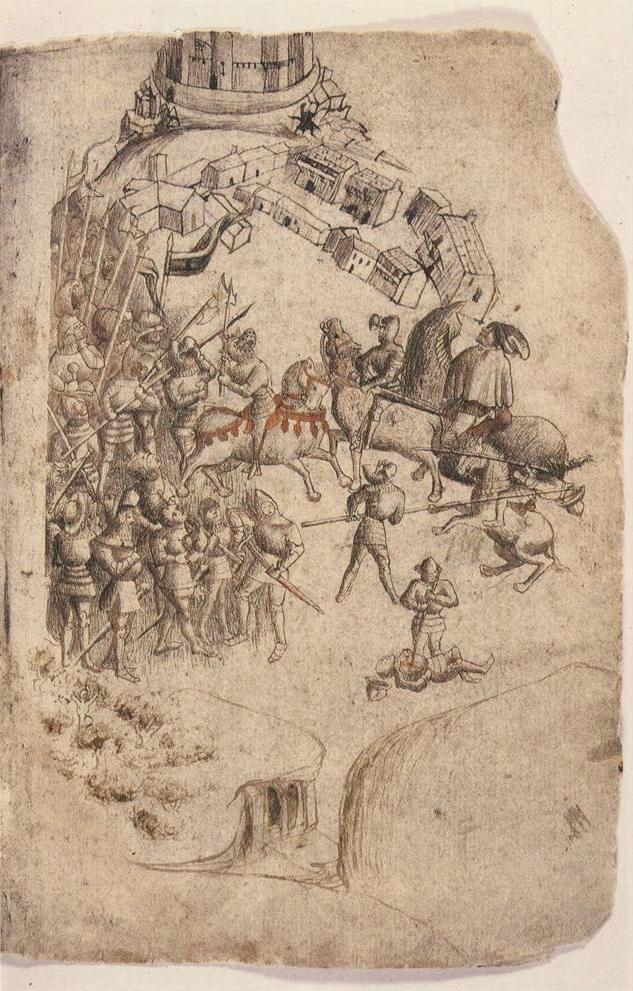
The English defeat in the Battle of Bannockburn marked a turning point in the Scottish Wars.

Gloucester was involved in a brief skirmish with the Scots on 23 June, 1314, the day before the main battle. While the king considered whether to camp for the night or to engage the Scots immediately, Gloucester and Hereford – either through insubordination or a misunderstanding – charged directly into the place called the New Park, where the Scots were encamped. The English immediately ran into difficulties, and Hereford's cousin Henry de Bohun was killed by King Robert the Bruce. It was perhaps during the subsequent retreat that Gloucester was thrown off his horse, but managed to escape unharmed. The next day the English were still not entirely decided on the course of action. While Gloucester took the part of certain experienced captains, recommending that Edward avoid battle that day, the younger men surrounding the king labelled this lethargic and cowardly, and advised attack. According to the Vita Edwardi, when Edward grew angry and accused Gloucester of treason, the earl forcefully replied that he would prove his loyalty on the field of battle.

The most detailed account of the Earl of Gloucester's death at the Battle of Bannockburn is the chronicle Vita Edwardi Secundi. This account is written as a moral tale, expounding on the earl's heroism and the cowardly conduct of his companions. For this reason, its historical accuracy must be taken with some caution. According to some accounts, Gloucester rushed headfirst into battle in the pursuit of glory and fell victim to his own foolishness. The Vita, on the other hand, claimed that as the earl was vigorously trying to fend off the Scottish attacks, he was knocked off his horse and killed when his own men failed to come to his rescue. It is also likely that the quarrels between Gloucester and Hereford over precedence could have contributed to the chaotic situation. According to one account, Gloucester rushed into battle without a distinguishing coat of arms, exposing himself to the Scottish soldiers, who otherwise would have been eager to secure a valuable ransom. However, Sir Thomas Gray, who was there, in Scalacronica gave a very different discription of that event saying, "of a truth when both armies engaged each other, and the great horses of the English charged the spears of the Scots, as it were into a dense forest, there arose a great and terrible crash of spears broken, and of destriers wounded to the death. Now the English in the rear could not reach the Scots because the leading divisions were in the way, nor could they do anything to help themselves, wherefore there was nothing for it but to take flight." So even ignoring that the Scots had been commanded by King Robert to refrain from taking prisoners during the heat of battle, the chances of being rescued by being taken prisoner in such a crush would be slim. Since the body was identified so soon after the battle that King Robert could stand vigil over it, it also calls into doubt the claim that he was not wearing his coat of arms.

After Gloucester was killed, the English army soon fell into disarray, and the battle resulted in a resounding victory for the Scots, and a humiliating withdrawal for the English. It was widely agreed that Gloucester, with his proud family history and valuable estates, was the most prominent of the many casualties that day. King Robert mourned his death^{[b]} and stood vigil over Gloucester's body at a local church (the two were second cousins). Later he allowed its transfer to England, where the earl was buried at Tewkesbury Abbey, on his father's right-hand side.

== Dispersal of estates and aftermath ==
Gloucester's political importance did not end with his death; his disappearance from the political scene had immediate consequences. In his Welsh lordship of Glamorgan, the uncertain situation caused by his death caused a short-lived rebellion in 1316. In Ireland, where he also held large possessions, the power vacuum he left behind facilitated the 1315 invasion by Robert the Bruce's brother Edward. The greatest consequences, however, resulted from the division of the de Clare estates. In 1308, Gilbert de Clare married Maud (or Matilda) de Burgh, the daughter of Richard de Burgh, Earl of Ulster. The couple left no surviving issue, so his death marked the end of the great de Clare family. The family lands were worth as much as £6,000, second only to those of the Earl of Lancaster among the nobility of the realm.

The lands went into royal possession while the matter of inheritance was being settled. By the entail of 1290, the lands could only be inherited by direct descendants of the seventh earl and Joan of Acre. Maud managed to postpone the proceedings by claiming to be pregnant, but by 1316 it was clear that this could not be the case. The late earl's sisters, Eleanor, Margaret (now widowed after the death of Gaveston) and Elizabeth were by 1317 all married to favourites of Edward II: Hugh Despenser the Younger, Hugh de Audley and Roger d'Amory respectively. The three were granted equal parts of the English possessions, but Despenser received the entire lordship of Glamorgan in Wales, politically the most important of the de Clare lands.

Not content with his part, Despenser used his relationship with the king to impinge on the lands of other Marcher lords. This caused resentment among such men as Hereford and Roger Mortimer, who rose up in rebellion in 1321. The rebellion was crushed, but resistance continued under the Marcher lords' ally Thomas of Lancaster, who was defeated at the Battle of Boroughbridge in 1322, and executed. Although this victory temporarily secured Edward's position on the throne, he was eventually deposed in 1326 by Roger Mortimer, with the help of the king's wife, Isabella of France. The title of Earl of Gloucester was recreated by Edward II's son Edward III in 1337, for Hugh de Audley.

== Ancestry ==
Ancestors of Gilbert de Clare, 8th Earl of Gloucester

16. Richard de Clare, 3rd Earl of Hertford
8. Gilbert de Clare, 4th Earl of Hertford
17. Amice FitzRobert, Countess of Gloucester
4. Richard de Clare, 5th Earl of Hertford
18. William Marshal, 1st Earl of Pembroke
9. Isabel Marshal
19. Isabel de Clare, 4th Countess of Pembroke
2. Gilbert de Clare, 7th Earl of Gloucester
20. Roger de Lacy
10. John de Lacy, 1st Earl of Lincoln
21. Maud de Clere
5. Maud de Lacy
22. Robert de Quincy
11. Margaret de Quincy
23. Hawise of Chester, 1st Countess of Lincoln
1. Gilbert de Clare, 8th Earl of Gloucester
24. John of England
12. Henry III of England
25. Isabella of Angoulême
6. Edward I of England
26. Ramon Berenguer IV, Count of Provence
13. Eleanor of Provence
27. Beatrice of Savoy
3. Joan of Acre
28. Alfonso IX of León
14. Ferdinand III of Castile
29. Berengaria of Castile
7. Eleanor of Castile
30. Simon of Dammartin
15. Joan, Countess of Ponthieu
31. Marie, Countess of Ponthieu

== Notes ==
b. Gloucester's wife Maud was the sister of Bruce's wife Elizabeth, both daughters of Richard de Burgh, Earl of Ulster.

== Sources ==
Primary:

- Barbour, John (1997). A.A.M. Duncan (ed.). The Bruce. Edinburgh: Canongate. ISBN 0-86241-681-7.
- Childs, Wendy, ed. (2005). Vita Edwardi Secundi. Oxford: Oxford University Press. ISBN 0-19-927594-7.
- Grey, Thomas (2000). Herbert Maxwell (ed.). Scalachronica. Felinfach: Llanerch. ISBN 978-1-86143-108-0.
- J. Stevenson, ed. (1839). Chronicon de Lanercost, 1201–1346. Edinburgh.

Secondary:

- Altschul, Michael (1965). A Baronial Family in Medieval England: The Clares, 1217–1314. Baltimore: The Johns Hopkins University Press. ISBN 0-8018-0022-6.
- Altschul, Michael (2004). "Clare, Gilbert de, eighth earl of Gloucester and seventh earl of Hertford (1291–1314)". Oxford Dictionary of National Biography. Oxford: Oxford University Press. doi:10.1093/ref:odnb/5439.
- Barrow, G. W. S. (1965). Robert Bruce and the Community of the Realm of Scotland. London: Eyre & Spottiswoode.
- Brown, Michael (2008). Bannockburn: The Scottish War and the British Isles, 1307–1323. Edinburgh: Edinburgh University Press. ISBN 978-0-7486-3332-6.
- Davies, James Conway (1918). The Baronial Opposition to Edward II: Its Character and Policy, a Study in Administrative History. London: Cass.
- Given-Wilson, Chris (1996). The English Nobility in the Late Middle Ages. London: Routledge. ISBN 0-415-14883-9.
- Haines, Roy Martin (2003). King Edward II: Edward of Caernarfon, His Life, His Reign, and Its Aftermath, 1284–1330. Montreal, London: McGill-Queens University Press. ISBN 978-0-7735-2432-3.
- Hamilton, J. S. (1988). Piers Gaveston, Earl of Cornwall, 1307–1312: Politics and Patronage in the Reign of Edward II. Detroit; London: Wayne State University Press; Harvester-Wheatsheaf. pp. 92–3. ISBN 0-8143-2008-2.
- Holmes, George (1957). The Estates of The Higher Nobility in Fourteenth Century England. Cambridge: Cambridge University Press.
- Knowles, Clive H. (2004). "Clare, Gilbert de, seventh earl of Gloucester and sixth earl of Hertford (1243–1295)". Oxford Dictionary of National Biography. Oxford: Oxford University Press. doi:10.1093/ref:odnb/5438.
- McKisack, May (1959). The Fourteenth Century: 1307–1399. Oxford: Oxford University Press. ISBN 0-19-821712-9.
- Maddicot, J.R. (1970). Thomas of Lancaster, 1307–1322. Oxford: Oxford University Press. ISBN 0-19-821837-0. OCLC 132766.
- Phillips, J.R.S. (1972). Aymer de Valence, Earl of Pembroke 1307–1324. Oxford: Oxford University Press. ISBN 0-19-822359-5. OCLC 426691.
- Prestwich, Michael (2007). Plantagenet England: 1225–1360 (new ed.). Oxford: Oxford University Press. ISBN 978-0-19-822844-8.
- Ward, Jennifer C. (2004). "Joan, countess of Hertford and Gloucester (1272–1307)". Oxford Dictionary of National Biography. Oxford: Oxford University Press. doi:10.1093/ref:odnb/14821.

Peerage of England
| Preceded by Gilbert de Clare | Earl of Hertford; 1308–1314 | Extinct |
| Preceded by Gilbert de Clare | Earl of Gloucester; 1308–1314 | Extinct |
