= Hugh Despenser the Younger =

English peer and favourite of Edward II (c.1287/1289–1326)

Hugh le Despenser
- 1st Baron le Despenser
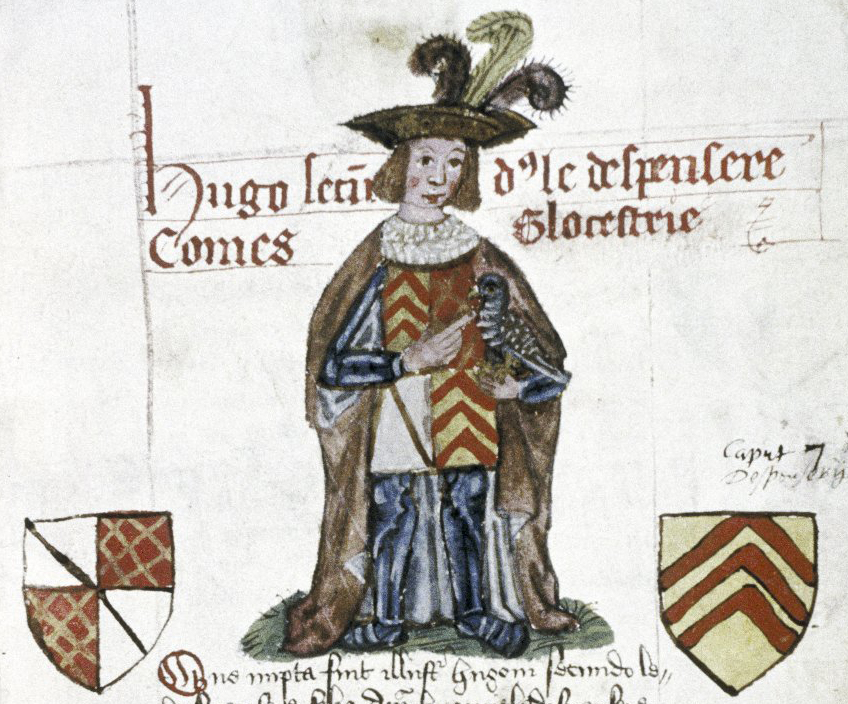
- Despenser in the Founders and Benefactors Book of Tewkesbury Abbey, c. 1525; his family arms of Quarterly 1st & 4th: Argent; 2nd & 3rd: Gules fretty or, over all a ribbon sable are at the bottom left
- Tenure: 1314–1326
- Predecessor: none
- Successor: Hugh le Despenser, 2nd Baron le Despenser
- Other names: the Younger Despenser
- Known for: Favourite of Edward II
- Born: c. 1287 – c. 1289
- Died: 24 November 1326 (aged 36–39); Hereford, Herefordshire, Kingdom of England
- Cause of death: Hanged, drawn and quartered
- Buried: Body: Tewkesbury Abbey, Gloucestershire; Heart: Hulton Abbey, Staffordshire
- Wars and battles: Despenser War; Isabella's Campaign
- Spouse: Eleanor de Clare (m. 1306)
- Issue: Hugh le Despenser; Edward le Despenser; Isabel le Despenser; Elizabeth le Despenser; Joan le Despenser; Gilbert le Despenser; John le Despenser; Eleanor le Despenser; Margaret le Despenser
- Father: Hugh le Despenser (the Elder)
- Mother: Isabel Beauchamp

Hugh le Despenser, 1st Baron le Despenser (also known as the Younger Despenser; c. 1287/1289 – 24 November 1326) was an English nobleman and royal favourite. He was the son and heir of Hugh Despenser, Earl of Winchester (the Elder Despenser) and his wife Isabel Beauchamp, daughter of William Beauchamp, 9th Earl of Warwick. Despenser rose to national prominence as chamberlain of the royal household and a close favourite of Edward II of England. His influence at court earned him many enemies among the English nobility. After the overthrow of Edward II, Despenser was charged with high treason and ultimately hanged, drawn and quartered.

== Titles and possessions ==
Despenser the Younger rose to become Chamberlain of the royal household, a position of significant influence as one of King Edward II’s closest advisors. In that role he managed the king’s domestic finances and court affairs, gaining favour and power at court. In 1317 he claimed the Lordship of Glamorgan through his marriage to Eleanor de Clare, daughter of Gilbert de Clare, 7th Earl of Gloucester, a vast Anglo‑Welsh estate inherited after her brother’s death, which made him one of the wealthiest magnates in south Wales. Through royal favour and marriage alliances he then gained additional lands in the Welsh Marches and in England.

At various times he was knight of Hanley Castle in Worcestershire and served as Constable of Odiham Castle. He was also appointed Keeper of Bristol Castle, Portchester Castle, and Dryslwyn Castle, and oversaw the surrounding towns and the Cantref Mawr region in Carmarthenshire. In Wales his authority extended across his lordship’s estates, and in England he was entrusted with the manors and lands of Brecknock, Hay and Cantref Selyf, as well as Huntington in Herefordshire.

Despenser was additionally granted Wallingford Castle in Berkshire, a royal fortress that had previously been held for life by Queen Isabella of France, demonstrating the extraordinary royal confidence he enjoyed.

== Marriage ==
In May 1306, Despenser was knighted at the Feast of the Swans at Westminster Abbey alongside Prince Edward, and in that summer he married Eleanor de Clare, daughter of the powerful noble Gilbert de Clare and Joan of Acre. Eleanor's grandfather, Edward I, had owed the elder Despenser 2,000 marks, a debt which the marriage settled. When Eleanor's brother, Gilbert, was killed in 1314 at the Battle of Bannockburn, she unexpectedly became one of the three co-heiresses to the rich Gloucester earldom, and in her right, Hugh inherited Glamorgan and other properties. In just a few years Hugh went from a landless knight to one of the wealthiest magnates in the kingdom.

Eleanor was also the niece of the new king, Edward II of England, and this connection brought Despenser closer to the English royal court. He joined the baronial opposition to Piers Gaveston, the king's favourite (and Despenser's brother-in-law, through Gaveston's marriage to Eleanor's sister Margaret). Eager for power and wealth, Despenser seized Tonbridge Castle in 1315, after his brother-in-law's death under the misapprehension that it belonged to his mother-in-law; he relinquished it on discovering that the rightful owner was, in fact, the Archbishop of Canterbury. He was accused of having Llywelyn Bren, a Welsh hostage in his custody, hanged, drawn and quartered on his own authority in 1318, despite the fact that Llywelyn had been "promised leniency" by Roger Mortimer and the earl of Hereford. However, this may actually have been done "at the command of the king himself", with Despenser being blamed because Mortimer and Hereford "could not publicly demonstrate their anger at" King Edward.

Eleanor and Hugh had nine children who survived infancy:

1. Hugh le Despenser (c. 1308/9 – 8 February 1349), Baron le Despenser, who was summoned to Parliament in 1338. At his death without issue, his nephew Edward, son of his brother Edward, was created Baron le Despenser in 1357.
2. Edward le Despenser (c. 1310 – 30 September 1342), soldier, killed at the siege of Vannes; father of Edward Despenser, Knight of the Garter, who became Baron le Despenser in a new creation of 1357
3. Isabel le Despenser, Countess of Arundel (c. 1312 – aft. 1356), the first wife of Richard Fitzalan, 10th Earl of Arundel. The marriage was annulled and their child, Edmund, was disinherited.
4. Joan le Despenser (c. 1314 – 15 November 1384), nun at Shaftesbury Abbey
5. Gilbert le Despenser (c. 1316 – April 1382)
6. John le Despenser (c. 1317 – June 1366)
7. Eleanor le Despenser (c. 1319 – February 1351), nun at Sempringham Priory
8. Margaret le Despenser (c. August 1323 – 1337), nun at Whatton Priory
9. Elizabeth le Despenser (c. December 1325 – 13 July 1389), married Maurice de Berkeley, 4th Baron Berkeley.

== Political maneuverings ==
Despenser became royal chamberlain in 1318. As a royal courtier, he manoeuvred into the affections of King Edward, displacing the previous favourite, Roger d'Amory. This came much to the dismay of the baronage, who saw him as taking their rightful places at court at best; at worst, they feared him becoming another Piers Gaveston, a previous favorite of Edward's who notoriously influenced the king. By 1320, Despenser's greed was running free. He also supposedly vowed revenge on Roger Mortimer, because Mortimer's grandfather had killed his own. By 1321, he had earned many enemies in every stratum of society, from Queen Isabella in France, to the barons, to the common people. There was even a plot to kill Despenser by sticking his wax likeness with pins.

Eventually, the barons took action against King Edward and, at the beseeching of Queen Isabella, forced Despenser and his father into exile in August 1321. However, Edward's intent to summon them back to England was no secret. The king rallied support after an attack against Isabella's party at Leeds Castle, an event possibly orchestrated. Early in the following year, with Mortimer's barons busy putting down uprisings in their lands, the Despensers were able to return. Edward, with the Despensers backing him once more, was able to crush the rebellion, securing first Mortimer's surrender and then that of the earl of Lancaster, who was subsequently executed.

King Edward quickly reinstated Despenser as royal favourite. The period from the Despensers' return from exile until the end of Edward II's reign was a time of uncertainty in England. With the main baronial opposition leaderless and weak, having been defeated at the Battle of Boroughbridge, and Edward willing to let them do as they pleased, the Despensers were left unchecked. This maladministration caused hostile feeling for them and, by extension, Edward II. Ultimately, a year after his surrender and imprisonment, Mortimer escaped to France, where he began organizing a new rebellion.

== Criminality ==
Like his father, the younger Despenser was accused of widespread criminality. Amongst other examples, Despenser seized the Welsh lands of his wife's inheritance while ignoring the claims of his two brothers-in-law. He further cheated his sister-in-law Elizabeth de Clare out of Gower and Usk, and forced Alice de Lacy, 4th Countess of Lincoln, to give up her lands to him. Both he and his father were accused of murdering Llywelyn Bren in 1318 while the Welshman was being held hostage in what was characterised by contemporaries as an extrajudicial killing, "conspiring together to exercise a jurisdiction which they could not lawfully have". During his exile, Despenser spent a period of time as a pirate in the English Channel, "a sea monster, lying in wait for merchants as they crossed the sea". At his makeshift trial, he would be accused "of robbing two great ships to the value of £60,000 'to the great dishonour of the king and the realm and to the great danger of English merchants in foreign countries'". He also had Sir William Cokerell "arrested and imprisoned" in the Tower of London and extorted £100 from him.

=== Accusations of sodomy ===
The 14th-century court historian Jean Froissart wrote that "he was a sodomite", and Adam Orleton, the Bishop of Winchester, also levelled the accusation at him (although Orleton's accusation came when he was defending himself from having claimed the same of King Edward). According to Froissart, Despenser's penis was severed and burned at his execution as a punishment for his sodomy and heresy. In 1326, as Isabella and Mortimer invaded, Orleton gave a sermon in which he publicly denounced Edward, who had fled with Despenser, as a sodomite. The annals of Newenham Abbey in Devon recorded, "the king and his husband" fled to Wales.

== Relationship with Isabella and downfall ==
Queen Isabella had a special dislike for Despenser. While Isabella was in France to negotiate between her husband and the French king, she formed an alliance with Roger Mortimer and began planning an invasion of England, which ultimately came to fruition in September 1326. Their forces numbered only about 1,500 mercenaries to begin with, but the majority of the nobility rallied to them throughout September and October, preferring to stand with them rather than Edward and the hated Despensers.

The Despensers fled west with the King, with a sizeable sum from the treasury; however, the escape was unsuccessful. Separated from the elder Despenser, the King and the younger Despenser were deserted by most of their followers and were captured near Neath in mid-November. King Edward was imprisoned and later forced to abdicate in favour of his son Edward III. The elder Despenser was hanged and then beheaded at Bristol on 27 October 1326, and the younger Despenser was brought to trial.

== Trial and execution ==
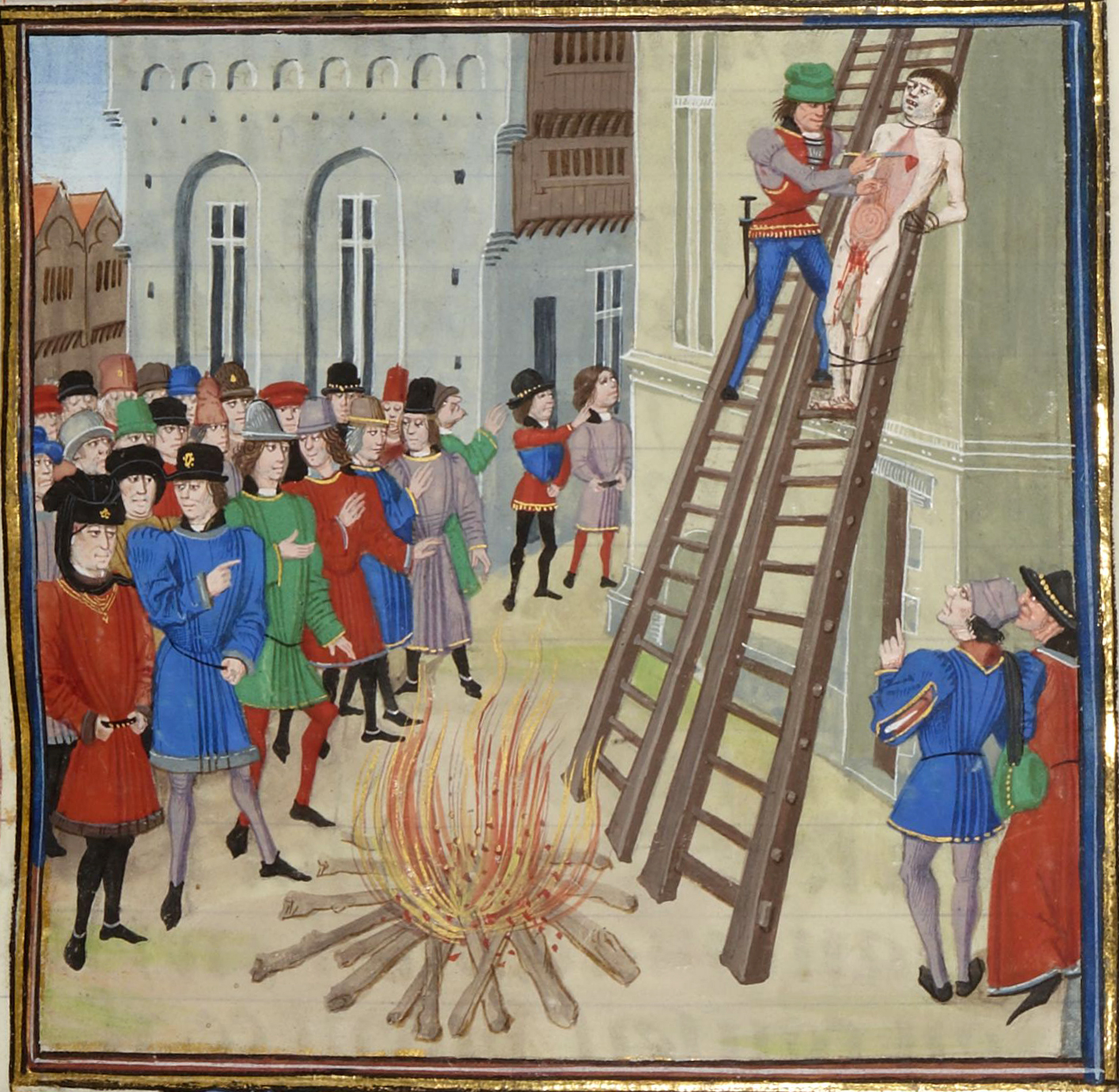
The execution of Hugh Despenser the Younger, from a manuscript of Jean Froissart

Anticipating that he would receive no mercy, Despenser tried to starve himself before his trial, but he was unsuccessful. "In order to legalise the process against him the tribunal that had carried out the judgement on the elder Despenser was reconvened. Roger [Mortimer], the Earls of Lancaster, Kent and Norfolk, and Thomas Wake and William Trussell" presided.

Despenser was tried on 24 November 1326, and taken to the market square of Hereford, before Mortimer, Isabella and the Lancastrian lords. He was accompanied by former Lord Chancellor of England Robert Baldock, and by one of his vassals, Simon de Reading, "who had been so presumptuous as to insult the queen and to take the lands of [Mortimer's] follower John Wyard", with de Reading being "tried alongside him". A large crowd of people "had gathered with trumpets and drums, ready to pull Despenser apart with their bare hands if need be." The prisoners were crowned with nettles to symbolise the "crime of accroaching royal power", while their surcoats bore "their coats of arms reversed", to proclaim their "treachery". Despenser's tunic bore a Latin verse from Psalm 52: Quid gloriaris in malicia qui potens es in iniquitate? ('Why do you glory in malice, you who are mighty in iniquity?') He was dragged to the ground by the crowd, who "stripped off his clothes and scrawled biblical slogans on his skin" which denounced "arrogance and evil".

The tribunal's "judgement was thorough, extensive and uncompromising. Only the sentence was in doubt. The Lancastrians wanted Despenser to be sentenced and beheaded at one of his own castles, in the same way that the earl of Lancaster had died at Pontefract in 1322." Historian Ian Mortimer argues that Mortimer, on the other hand, "wanted to ensure that Despenser suffered a death every bit as horrific" as that endured by Llywelyn Bren (although his role in Llywelyn's execution was not mentioned in the extensive list of charges against him), while Queen Isabella "wanted him executed in London. The number of aggrieved parties meant that Despenser was certain to be quartered: every lord wanted a piece to show their followers that they had exacted revenge."

Trussell declared that he had been "ajudged a traitor and an enemy of the realm", and read out the "exhaustingly long" list of charges against him, including:

breaking the terms of exile, breaching Magna Carta and the Ordinances of 1311, killing, imprisoning and tyrannizing the great and good of the realm, causing the king to fight in Scotland at the cost of thousands of men's lives, usurping royal authority and attempting to fund the destruction of Queen Isabella and her son Duke Edward while they were in France.

Despenser was condemned to death. For the crime of theft, he was sentenced to hanging, while his treason was to be punished by drawing and quartering. He was subsequently "roped to four horses – not just the usual two – and dragged through the city to the walls of his own castle" to "a specially made 50-foot gallows, designed to make punishment visible to everyone in the town." There he was hanged, drawn and quartered in the presence of Isabella, Mortimer and their followers. Simon de Reading was also hanged, on a gibbet "ten feet lower" than Despenser's. Robert Baldock, as an archdeacon, was able to claim benefit of clergy, and was "handed over to his fellow clergymen for trial". However, after being taken to London, "the mob broke into the house in which he was held, beat him almost to death, and threw him into Newgate prison, where he was soon finished off by the inmates."

In 14th-century historian Jean Froissart's account of his execution, Despenser was tied firmly to a ladder and his genitals sliced off and burned while he was still conscious. His entrails were slowly pulled out. Finally, his heart was cut out and thrown into a fire, "because it had been false and traitorous". Froissart (or, rather, Jean le Bel's chronicle, on which he relied) is the only source to mention this; other contemporary accounts state that Despenser was hanged, drawn and quartered, which did not usually involve emasculation.

Despenser's corpse was decapitated "to a chorus of ecstatic cheers", and the head sent to be displayed above the gates of London. The "arms, torso and legs were likewise sent to be displayed above the gates of Newcastle, York, Dover and Bristol. Justice was very visibly and viscerally done."

== Remains ==
Four years later, in December 1330, his widow was given permission to gather and bury Despenser's remains at the family's Gloucestershire estate, but only the head, a thigh bone and a few vertebrae were returned to her.

What may be the remains of Despenser were identified in February 2008 in the village of Abbey Hulton in Staffordshire, the former site of Hulton Abbey. The skeleton, which was first uncovered during archaeological work in the 1970s, appeared to be that of a victim of a drawing and quartering as it had been beheaded and chopped into several pieces with a sharp blade, suggesting a ritual killing. Furthermore, it lacked several body parts, including the ones given to Despenser's wife. Radiocarbon analysis dated the body to between 1050 and 1385, and later tests suggested it to be that of a man over 34 years old; Despenser was 39 at the time of his execution. In addition, the abbey is located on lands that belonged to Hugh de Audley, Despenser's brother-in-law, at the time.

== Legacy ==
The Tyranny and Fall of Edward II: 1321–1326 by historian Natalie Fryde is a study of Edward's reign during the years that the Despensers' power was at its peak. Fryde pays particular attention to the subject of the Despensers' landholdings. The numerous accusations against the younger Despenser at the time of his execution have never been the subject of close critical scrutiny, although Roy Martin Haines called them "ingenuous" and noted their propagandistic nature.

Despenser is a minor character in Christopher Marlowe's play Edward II (1592), where, as "Spencer", he is little more than a substitute for the dead Gaveston. Despenser also appears as a character in Maurice Druon's historical fiction series Les Rois maudits, along with its television adaptations. In 2006, he was selected by BBC History magazine as the 14th century's worst Briton.

His fall and execution are described in The She-Wolf, book 5 of the Accursed Kings series by Maurice Druon. He is referenced in early books in the series, which emphasizes his homosexual love affair with King Edward as a driving force in his estrangement from Queen Isabella, which led to his fall.

== Sources ==
- Anon. (2005). Denholm-Young, Nöel; Childs, Wendy R. (eds.). Vita Edwardi Secundi: The life of Edward the Second. Oxford: Oxford University Press. ISBN 0-1992-7594-7. OCLC 229295966.
- Fryde, Natalie (1979). The Tyranny and Fall of Edward II, 1321–1326. Cambridge: Cambridge University Press. ISBN 0-5212-2201-X.
- Haines, Roy Martin (2003). King Edward II: Edward of Caernarfon, His Life, His Reign, and its Aftermath, 1284–1330. Montréal; London: McGill-Queen's University Press. ISBN 0-7735-2432-0.
- Hunt, William (1885). Despenser, Hugh le (d.1326) – via Wikisource.
- Jones, Dan (2013). The Plantagenets: The Kings Who Made England. London: William Collins. pp. 417–418. ISBN 978-0-0072-1394-8.
- Matthew, H. C. G. (2004). "Hugh Despenser the Younger". Oxford Dictionary of National Biography. Oxford: Oxford University Press.
- Mortimer, Ian (2006). The Greatest Traitor: The Life of Sir Roger Mortimer, 1st Earl of March, Ruler of England, 1327–1330. London: Jonathan Cape. ISBN 0-3123-4941-6.
- Calendar of Close Rolls. Westminster: Parliament of England. 1224–1468.
- Phillips, Seymour (2011). Edward II. New Haven, CT & London: Yale University Press. ISBN 978-0-3001-7802-9.
