= Hugh le Despenser, Baron le Despenser (1338) =

English noble

Hugh le Despenser
- Baron le Despenser
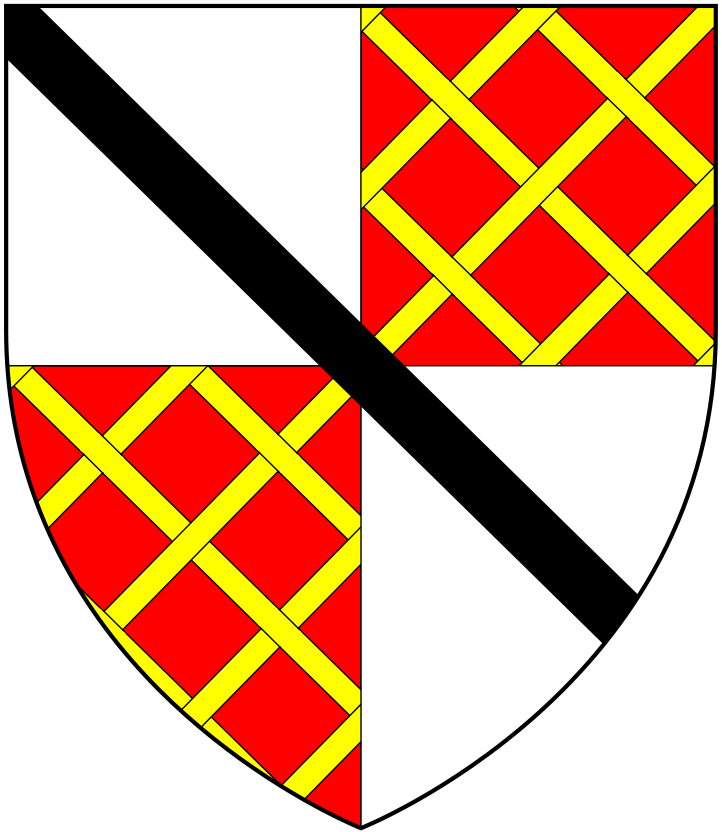
- Arms of Despenser
- Predecessor: Hugh Despenser the Elder
- Successor: Edward Despenser
- Other titles: Lord of Glamorgan
- Other names: Huchon Despenser; Hughelyn Despenser
- Born: c. 1308/9
- Died: 8 February 1349
- Buried: Tewkesbury Abbey, Gloucestershire, England
- Wars and battles: Second War of Scottish Independence; Hundred Years' War; War of the Breton Succession
- Spouse: Elizabeth Montague (m. 1341)
- Father: Hugh Despenser the Younger
- Mother: Eleanor de Clare

Hugh le Despenser, 1st Baron le Despenser (c. 1308/9 – 8 February 1349), Lord of Glamorgan, was an English peer. Imprisoned as a consequence of his support for deposed king Edward II, he would return to royal favour under Edward III, being made Baron le Despenser in 1338. His title became extinct at his death without issue.

== Origin ==
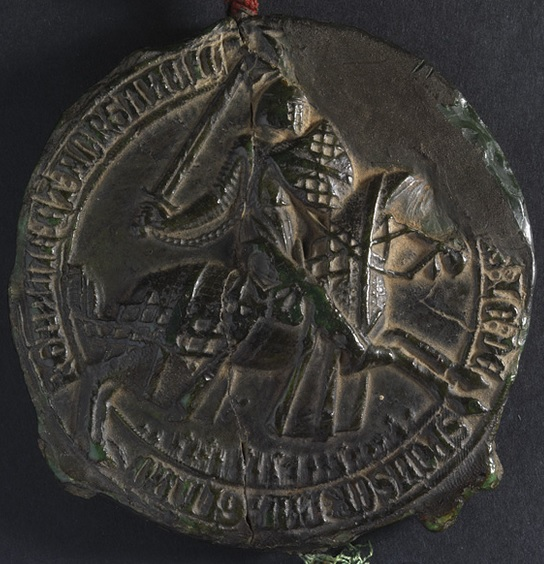
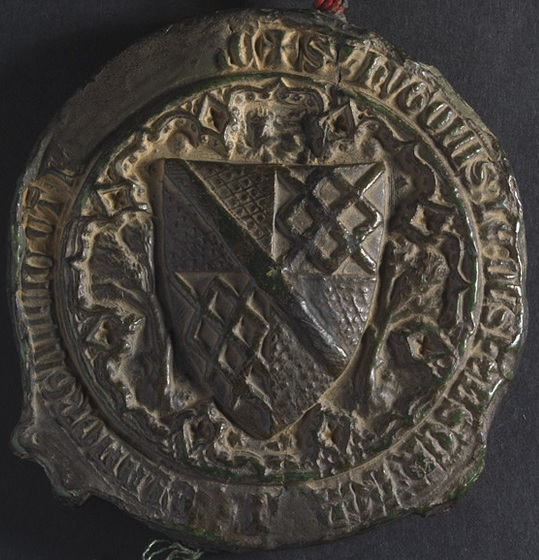
1338 seal of Hugh le Despenser, 3rd Baron le Despenser, recto and verso, showing on his shield and horse's caparison the arms of Despenser. National Library of Wales. Legend: S(IGILLUM) HUGONIS LE DESPENSER D(OMI)NI GLAMORGANCIE ET MORGANCIE ("Seal of Hugh le Despenser Lord of Glamorgan and Morgan")

Hugh was the eldest son and heir of Hugh Despenser the Younger and grandson of Hugh le Despenser, 1st Earl of Winchester. His father and grandfather were both executed and attainted in 1326, when the young Hugh was 18 years old. His mother, Eleanor de Clare, suo jure 6th Lady of Glamorgan, was daughter of Gilbert de Clare, 6th Earl of Hertford and Joan of Acre, a sister of King Edward II.

== Career ==
In 1326, Hugh was ordered by fugitive king Edward II to seize the properties of Henry, Earl of Lancaster. He also supported the king by a long defense of Caerphilly Castle against the forces of the queen, which he only surrendered in 1327 after being promised his life and bodily integrity. He was imprisoned until 1331, including time at Bristol Castle. He was named as a co-conspirator by Edmund, Earl of Kent, in the latter's 1330 confession. Following Edward III reaching majority and overthrowing his mother's faction, Hugh was freed and the king granted him lands and rents worth 200 marks annually. Hugh made a pilgrimage to Santiago de Compostela in 1332.

He succeeded his mother's Glamorgan lordship in 1337, and fought in the Scottish Wars in 1337 and 1338. He was summoned to Royal Councils in 1338, and in the same year was summoned to Parliament, by modern usage making him Baron le Despenser by a new creation, since the attainder of his father and grandfather were still in force. He fought at Sluys in 1340 and at Brittany and Morlaix in 1342 as a banneret. He accompanied the King Edward to France in 1346, and was in the royal retinue at Crecy, and the following year was summoned by the king to the siege of Calais.

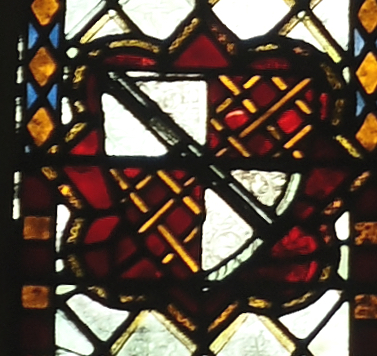
Arms of Despenser in stained glass, Tewkesbury Abbey, burial place of Hugh le Despenser, Baron le Despenser

== Family and death ==
Hugh had married by April 1341 to Elizabeth Montagu, daughter of William Montagu, 1st Earl of Salisbury and Catherine Grandison, and widow of Giles, Baron Badlesmere, but they had no children. Hugh died 8 February 1349 and was buried at Tewkesbury Abbey, Gloucestershire, the Barony le Despenser created for him becoming extinct. He was succeeded in his lands by his nephew, Edward Despenser, who was created Baron le Despenser of a new creation in 1357. Hugh's widow, Elizabeth, would remarry to Sir Guy, Baron Briene, before dying in 1359, also being buried at Tewkesbury Abbey.

== Ancestry ==
Ancestors of Hugh le Despenser, Baron le Despenser (1338)

8. Hugh le Despenser, 1st Baron le Despenser
4. Hugh le Despenser, 1st Earl of Winchester
9. Aline Bassett
2. Hugh Despenser the Younger
10. William de Beauchamp, 9th Earl of Warwick
5. Isabella de Beauchamp
11. Maud FitzJohn
1. Hugh le Despenser
12. Richard de Clare, 5th Earl of Hertford
6. Gilbert de Clare, 6th Earl of Hertford
13. Maud de Lacy
3. Eleanor de Clare
14. Edward I of England
7. Joan of Acre
15. Eleanor of Castile

== Notes ==
Peerage of England
| Preceded by Hugh Despenser | Baron le Despenser | Extinct |
