= William Ferrers, 3rd Baron Ferrers of Groby =

Arms of Ferrers, Baron Ferrers of Groby: Gules, seven mascles or conjoined 3:3:1. These are the arms of de Quincy, adopted in lieu of his paternal arms (Vairy or and gules) by William Ferrers, 1st Baron Ferrers of Groby (1272–1325). He was the son and heir of Sir William de Ferrers (1240–1287) of Groby, the younger son of William de Ferrers, 5th Earl of Derby (by his second wife Margaret de Quincy, daughter and heiress of Roger de Quincy, 2nd Earl of Winchester (c. 1195 – 1264)) who founded the line of Baron Ferrers of Groby, having been given Groby Castle by his mother Margaret de Quincy.

William Ferrers, 3rd Baron Ferrers of Groby (1333–1371) was a Leicestershire-based nobleman in fourteenth-century England who took part in some of the major campaigns of the first part of the Hundred Years' War. The eldest of two sons to Henry Ferrers, 2nd Baron Ferrers of Groby (d. 1343), and Isabel de Verdun, daughter of Theobald de Verdun, 2nd Baron Verdun, William was ten years old when he succeeded his father to the Barony.

== Early life ==
William Ferrers was born at the family caput of Newbold Verdon, Leicestershire, on 28 February 1333, and received baptism the same day. Two years after his father's death, an allowance of £50 was remitted by the king and council for his care (later, in 1349, converted into a grant of the manors of Stoke on Tern, Wootton and Hethe). As he was still a minor, custody of his patrimony was shared between King Edward III's queen, Philippa, and his son, Edward. William Ferrers grew up as the bubonic plague was ravaging the country, and like everywhere else, this had a severely deleterious effect on the Ferrers family's finances. Almost entire villages were being wiped out (for example, that of Hethe, one of the Ferrerses' manors, lost 21 out of its 27 villeins) which meant whole crops were being lost and the value of those manors collapsed.

== Career ==
Ferrers had been knighted by 1351, and the queen granted him the estates of his that she held. Two years later, having paid homage to Edward III, he received livery of his estates in England and Ireland.

Historian Eric Acheson has suggested that it was a direct consequence of the Black Death that led Ferrers to exchange away many of his outlying estates (for example, those in Shropshire) for some closer to home (in Buckinghamshire), with the Earl of March in the late 1350s. By 1364 he had also sold his remaining lands in Ireland, having already been exonerated from having taxes levied on his Irish estates for the defence of that country in 1460, due to his constant service with the king in the preceding years, "at great cost to himself."

=== Service in France ===
Acheson has also suggested that it was probably Ferrers' direly unstable financial situation that led him to seek a career in royal service, as the king had started a new war with France. Ferrers accompanied the Black Prince to Gascony in 1355. fought at the Battle of Crécy in 1355, at Poitiers the following year, and was with Henry of Grosmont, 1st Duke of Lancaster in the 1359–60 Reims campaign. Ferrers last served in France in 1369, again with Lancaster, raiding Picardy and Caux that July.

== Family and death ==
William Ferrers married twice. His first marriage was to Margaret, the coheiress of her childless brother William Ufford, Earl of Suffolk (in whose retinue he had seen French service in 1355), and her father the Robert d'Ufford, 1st Earl of Suffolk. This brought him further estates in Suffolk. With her, William had a son and two daughters; she had died by 1368. His next marriage was to another Margaret, the daughter of Henry de Percy, 2nd Baron Percy, the widow of Sir Robert de Umfraville. This marriage was childless and she survived Ferrers by four years.

Ferrers' last will and testament was written in July 1368, in which he requested interment in the family crypt at Ulverscroft Priory. He died in Stebbing, Essex, during the night of 8 January 1371. He was succeeded by his only son from his first marriage, Henry, who inherited the barony.

Peerage of England
Preceded by Henry Ferrers	Baron Ferrers of Groby; 1343–1371	Succeeded by Henry Ferrers
