= William Ferrers, 5th Baron Ferrers of Groby =

English nobleman in the Late Middle Ages

Arms of Ferrers, Baron Ferrers of Groby: Gules, seven mascles or conjoined 3:3:1. These are the arms of de Quincy, adopted in lieu of his paternal arms (Vairy or and gules) by William Ferrers, 1st Baron Ferrers of Groby (1272–1325). He was the son and heir of Sir William de Ferrers of Groby (1240–1287), the younger son of William de Ferrers, 5th Earl of Derby (by his second wife Margaret de Quincy, daughter and heiress of Roger de Quincy, 2nd Earl of Winchester (c. 1195 – 1264)) who founded the line of Baron Ferrers of Groby, having been given Groby Castle by his mother Margaret de Quincy.

William Ferrers, 5th Baron Ferrers of Groby (1372–1445) was an English baron in the Late Middle Ages. He was an important figure in Leicestershire society and took part in most of the royal commissions that were held there. He was also active at a national level and earlier in his career he took part in some of the crises in the reigns of both kings Richard II and Henry IV. However, he supported the Lancastrian regime under Henry V and acted as a councillor to that king's baby son when the latter inherited the throne at the age of six months. Ferrers was married three times, twice to daughters of the peerage. Because his eldest son died before him, the Ferrers barony descended to his granddaughter's husband. Thus, when William Ferrers died, the Ferrers line, which had begun in England with the Norman Conquest, after which they were first granted lands in Leicestershire came to an end.

== Early years and inheritance ==
Ferrers was born at Hoo, Bedfordshire, and baptised there on the same day, 25 April 1372. He was the only son and heir of Henry Ferrers, 4th Baron Ferrers of Groby and his wife, Jean, daughter of Sir Thomas Hoo of Luton Hoo. The bulk of the Ferrers' family landholding was in Leicestershire. In May 1394, Ferrers turned 21—the age of majority—and, on paying homage to King Richard II, received livery of his inheritance, the king's escheator taking his fealty in Warwickshire and Leicestershire. By July he had received his mother's dower lands, including the knight's fees and advowsons, and the following year he had received livery of manors in Suffolk.

== Career ==
One of Ferrers' earliest acts of royal service was to join the king on his 1394–95 expedition to Ireland, where a by-now "resurgent" Irish nobility was threatening royal rule. Two years later, Ferrers was summoned to parliament for the first time, and would attend four more parliaments between then and January 1444. On at least two of those occasions, he was appointed a trier of petitions.

Although he had shown loyalty to the king in his early years, says the Ferrers family's most recent biographer, William's "political affiliations were flexible." Ferrers took part in some of the momentous events of the last years of Richard II's turbulent reign. In September 1397 he was among those who swore, upon the shrine of Edward the Confessor in the Palace of Westminster, to uphold statutes. Two years later—after the usurpation of Henry IV—he was a member of the House of Lords that gave its assent to the secret imprisonment of the by-then-deposed King Richard. In 1401 he was a member of the lords who condemned two members of the Holland family as traitors, John, Duke of Exeter and his nephew Thomas, Duke of Surrey, who had been executed the previous year for their part in the failed 'Epiphany Rising' of the previous year. Five years later, Ferrers also sealed the exemplifications of the Acts which settled the royal succession, in July and December 1406.

Ferrers also joined the royal council in 1422, after the death of King Henry V in France, as the new king—also Henry—was six months old. Ferrers' appointment, says Ralph Griffiths, "provided an injection of youth into discussions hitherto conducted by a rather elderly group"; in any case, it made the regency council "more fully and representatively attended."

However, Ferrers spent as much time as a local administrator and looking after his estates as he did in national politics. He was a justice of the peace and a commissioner of array in Leicestershire for most of his life. However, local politics was not always more peaceful than government. In 1426, for example, Sir William Bermingham, from Coventry, with a group of men, attacked Ferrers' house in Smethwick and killed two of Ferrers' servants in doing so.

== Family ==
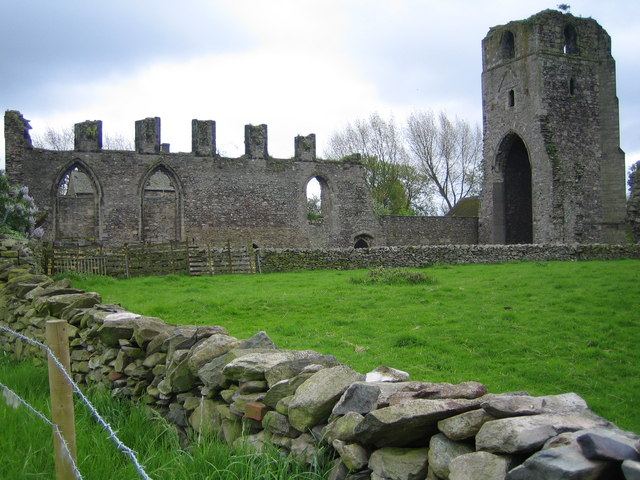
The remains of Ulverscroft Priory as seen in 2006; William Ferrers was buried here in 1445.

Ferrers married three times. His first marriage was arranged whilst he was still a minor. At the age of sixteen, a few months after the death of his father, the right to dictate his marriage was conferred upon Roger, Lord Clifford. As was the custom of the time, Clifford arranged for Ferrers to marry Clifford's daughter Philippa, and this not only connected Ferrers to the Clifford noble house but also (through Clifford's marriage to Maud Beauchamp, daughter of Thomas) to the Earl of Warwick. Ferrers' second marriage was to a Margaret Montagu (died before October 1416), daughter of John, Earl of Salisbury, and his third was to Elizabeth Standisshe, daughter of Robert Standisshe of Lancashire. This last marriage had taken place by the end of October 1416, and had not received a royal licence; Ferrers was her third marriage also.

=== Death and will ===
Elizabeth predeceased him, dying in either January or February 1441; he outlived her by slightly over four years, dying on 18 May 1445 at his manor of Woodham Ferrers, Essex. His will had been written the day before. Ferrers left a bequest that his body be buried in Ulverscroft Priory, Leicestershire. Ferrers had had to take part in the income tax of 1436, at which his estate was valued at £666. Ferrers' heir, Thomas, was worth £100 on top of this. However, although Thomas was his heir, he was only William's second son. Ferrers' eldest son and original heir, Henry, had died in 1425. As a result, the family caput honoris of Groby and its barony passed not to Thomas but to William Ferrers' granddaughter—and Henry's heiress—Elizabeth (1419–1483). She eventually married Sir Edward Grey (son of Reynold Grey, 3rd Baron Grey of Ruthin) in 1426 and thus conveyed the Barony of Groby away from the Ferrers family; this, historian K. B. McFarlane believed, was the point at which the Ferrers family line was finally extinguished.

Peerage of England
Preceded by Henry Ferrers	Baron Ferrers of Groby; 1388–1445	Succeeded by Elizabeth Ferrers
