= Henry Ferrers, 4th Baron Ferrers of Groby =

Member of the Parliament of England

Arms of Ferrers, Baron Ferrers of Groby: Gules, seven mascles or conjoined 3:3:1. These are the arms of de Quincy, adopted in lieu of his paternal arms (Vairy or and gules) by William Ferrers, 1st Baron Ferrers of Groby (1272-1325). He was the son and heir of Sir William de Ferrers (1240-1287) of Groby, the younger son of William de Ferrers, 5th Earl of Derby (by his second wife Margaret de Quincy, daughter and heiress of Roger de Quincy, 2nd Earl of Winchester (c.1195-1264)) who founded the line of Baron Ferrers of Groby, having been given Groby Castle by his mother Margaret de Quincy

Henry Ferrers, 4th Baron Ferrers of Groby (1356–1388) was a fourteenth-century English nobleman. He was a professional soldier, taking part in a number of campaigns during the reign of Richard II, served on several royal commissions, was a justice of the peace and a member of parliament.

== Youth and early life ==
He was the only son of William, Lord Ferrers by his father's first marriage to Margaret Uford, daughter of Robert d'Ufford, Earl of Suffolk and Margaret Norwich. He was born in Tilty Abbey, Essex on 6 February 1356, and baptised in nearby Stebbing Whilst still a minor, in the words of the family's most recent biographer, he "fell prey to the fraudulent schemes of his father's feoffees", who attempted to dispossess Henry of certain Essex and Warwickshire estates. Two of his father's feoffees, a clerk called Edmund de Stebbing and one Robert de Bradenham attempted to use a forged release, which would allow them to take the manors into their own hands. At some point, but certainly before 27 June 1371 he married Joan, possibly the daughter of Sir Thomas de Hoo of Luton Hoo; they had one son, his heir William, who had been born on 25 April 1372 in Hoo, Bedfordshire.

== Career ==
In 1377, he paid homage and fealty to King Edward III for his patrimony and those lands held in dower by his father's second wife Margaret, his stepmother. During the following decade, Ferrers was regularly appointed to royal commission within Leicestershire, including those of Array, Oyer and Terminer, and as a Justice of the Peace. He was also summoned to parliament as Henrico de Ferrariis de Groby from the August 1377 parliament to that of December 1387.

Ferrers was essentially a professional soldier, taking part in five campaigns during the reign of Richard II alone. He performed much royal service in the Hundred Years' War, being part of the earl of Buckingham's contingent in 1377 (in which he was a captain) and that of the duke of Lancaster in 1378. Ferrers fought again under Buckingham in the 1380-1 Brittany chevauchée. He took part in Richard II's invasion of Scotland of August 1385 where he was with Richard in the main battle. Two years later the king, with Queen Anne, stayed with Henry Ferrers at Groby whilst on a Royal progress around The Midlands.

In 1382, he and two others were found by Inquisition post mortem to be the heirs of William Ufford, Earl of Suffolk, by rights of their wives, Suffolk's sisters. He died 3 February 1388 aged 31; his wife Joan survived him, dying in 1394.

Peerage of England
Preceded by William Ferrers	Baron Ferrers of Groby; 1371–1388	Succeeded by William Ferrers
