= Henry Ferrers, 2nd Baron Ferrers of Groby =

Arms of Ferrers, Baron Ferrers of Groby: Gules, seven mascles or conjoined 3:3:1. These are the arms of de Quincy, adopted in lieu of his paternal arms (Vairy or and gules) by William Ferrers, 1st Baron Ferrers of Groby (1272-1325). He was the son and heir of Sir William de Ferrers (1240-1287) of Groby, the younger son of William de Ferrers, 5th Earl of Derby (by his second wife Margaret de Quincy, daughter and heiress of Roger de Quincy, 2nd Earl of Winchester (c.1195-1264)) who founded the line of Baron Ferrers of Groby, having been given Groby Castle by his mother Margaret de Quincy

Henry Ferrers, 2nd Baron Ferrers (c.1303-15 Sep 1343) was the son of William Ferrers, 1st Baron Ferrers of Groby and his wife Ellen. Henry Ferrers has been described by one recent historian as "arguably the most successful member of his family" on account of his being the only one, in six generations, to have succeeded to his patrimony as an adult, thus "protecting his inheritance from the hazards of wardship".

== Career ==
Henry Ferrers was active in royal service from early on. By 1325, he was with the Prince of Wales, Edward of Windsor in France, having accompanied Henry Beaumont in his retinue. Events in England were however coming to a head at this time. In 1327, King Edward II was overthrown and forced to abdicate by his wife, Queen Isabella and her lover Roger Mortimer, but by the end of the decade their regime had become equally unpopular, and there was increasing baronial opposition to their rule. From at least 1329 then, Henry Ferrers was also in the service of Henry, Earl of Lancaster, a leader of that opposition, and Ferrers provided military assistance at Bedford with him in January that year in the earl's chevauchée against Isabella and Mortimer. As a result, his lands were confiscated by their regime, but were released back to him in February, and Ferrers was allowed to avoid payment of a £5,000 fine that had been levied on him. Ferrers was partly responsible for the capture and eventual hanging at Tyburn of the Queen's lover, Roger Mortimer, and for this, he later received a pardon for any offences committed in the course of this episode.

Soon after, Ferrers was appointed to the earl's council, for which he received an annuity of £100. Ferrers was also due to take part in the aborted Irish campaign of 1332 (with "as great a force as he could muster"), but he did fight as one of the 'Disinherited' with Edward Balliol against Scotland later the same year. He was appointed Keeper of the Channel Islands in 1333, and two years later he received the Constableship of Berwick-on-Tweed, prior to a return to military service in Scotland in 1336. He was also intermittently Justice of Chester between 1336 and 1342.

As both royal councillor and King's Chamberlain, Ferrers played an important role in Edward III's military campaigns of the 1330s. Not only did he play an active role in the actual fighting, but he was responsible for negotiating alliances (such as that with the Count of Flanders) and loans for the King. In the case of the latter he was often the King's personal guarantor. In return, Ferrers was granted various profitable concessions from the wine trade and the right to hold weekly markets and fairs in Groby, Woodham, and Stebbing. In 1337, he received a royal grant of manors in Buckinghamshire, Derbyshire, and Essex., which together provided an annual income of £160. He was also promised 460 marks per annum by Edward III in view of Ferrers' almost constant service at this time; in 1431 he once again travelled abroad for the King, this time to Brittany.

== Marriage and inheritance ==
When his father died in 1325, Henry Ferrers was at least twenty-two years of age, and so, on paying his homage to King Edward II, could enter immediately into possession of his inheritance on 24 April that year. By 1331 he had married Isabel de Verdun (a great granddaughter of Edward I) who was co-heiress to Theobald de Verdun, 2nd Baron Verdun (who had died in 1316), by his second wife Elizabeth de Clare. This resulted in Henry Ferrers obtaining possession of property, through his wife, in Ireland and throughout the English Midlands, from Gloucestershire and Derbyshire. He also received the reversion of many of his mother-in-law's manors.

Henry was survived by Isabel, as well as by two sons and two daughters. His heir was William, who would inherit the Groby lordship as third baron (1333 - 1371). William married Margaret de Ufford, daughter of Robert d'Ufford, 1st Earl of Suffolk and Margaret de Norwich.

- Infant (b. February 1331), whose name and sex is not known, died shortly after birth.
- Ralph de Ferrers, married Joan de Grey of Codnor, daughter of Richard Grey, 2nd Baron Grey of Codnor.
- Elizabeth de Ferrers (died 22 October 1375), married firstly David de Strathbogie, 12th Earl of Atholl, by whom she had issue. She married secondly, John Malewayn.
- Philippa de Ferrers (died 10 August 1384), married Guy de Beauchamp, son of Thomas de Beauchamp, 11th Earl of Warwick and Katherine Mortimer, by whom she had two daughters.

== Death ==
In July 1342 he was described in the records as being "sick and weak" and his condition seems never to have improved; he died at Groby on 15 September 1343. He was buried at Ulverscroft Priory. His wife survived him by four years; they had had two sons, including William, his heir, and two daughters.

Peerage of England
Preceded by William Ferrers	Baron Ferrers of Groby; 1325–1343	Succeeded by William Ferrers

== Sources ==
- Blanton, Virginia (2010). Signs of Devotion: The Cult of St. Æthelthryth in Medieval England, 695-1615. Pennsylvania State University Press.
