= William de Vaux =

William de Vaux (c. 1215 – May 1252) was an English nobleman. He held lands in Tharston in Norfolk and Wissett in Suffolk, before succeeding to his fathers estates in 1244 at Pentney.

== Life ==
Vaux was the second son of Oliver de Vaux and Pernel de Craon. His father was prominent in the baronial opposition to King John of England in 1215. His elder brother Robert died young without issue, with William the next in line to succeed to his fathers estates. William was married to Eleanor de Ferrers, the youngest of seven daughters of William III de Ferrers, earl of Derby, and Sybil Marshal. Eleanor was one of the heiresses of the Marshal family through her mother. The marriage was undertaken without the Kings licence and William was required to pay a 200 Marks fine.

William died in May 1252 without children.. He was succeeded by his younger brother John. Eleanor continued to use William's family name, de Vaux or de Vallibus, until her death. Eleanor afterwards remarried, secondly to Roger de Quincy, earl of Winchester in December 1252 and thirdly Roger de Leybourne, sheriff of Kent, before 1267. Eleanor died in October 1274.
