= Henry Ferrers =

Henry Ferrers may refer to:

- Henry Ferrers (antiquary) (died 1633), English antiquary
- Henry de Ferrers, Norman soldier
- Sir Henry Ferrers, 1st Baronet (died 1663), of the Ferrers baronets
- Sir Henry Ferrers, 2nd Baronet (c. 1630–1675), of the Ferrers baronets
- Henry Ferrers, 2nd Baron Ferrers of Groby (1303–1343)
- Henry Ferrers, 4th Baron Ferrers of Groby (1356–1388)
