= Gwladys ferch Dafydd =

Gwladys ferch Dafydd (died c. 1336) was the daughter of Dafydd ap Gruffydd, the last free Prince of Wales, and Elizabeth Ferrers. She probably spent most of her early life in the company of her father in England and Gwynedd.

Upon the death of his brother Llywelyn ap Gruffudd, on 10 December 1282, Dafydd ap Gruffydd briefly took over as Prince of Wales. Hearing the news, Edward I gathered his forces to unseat the newly named prince. Dafydd, his family, and a few stalwart supporters went into hiding in the hills of Snowdonia. Sensing a losing effort, most of his countrymen gave up hope of continuing the Gwynedd regime. In June 1283, Gwladys was arrested with her father, mother, brothers (Llywelyn and Owain), and sisters.

Dafydd was hanged, drawn and quartered for treason. Dafydd's sons were imprisoned. Gwladys was dispatched to the Gilbertine convent in Sixhills, Lincolnshire, as a young child. Edward I ordered annual payment of 20 pounds for Gwladys's upkeep at the Sixhills convent, where she spent the remainder of her life. She is thought to have died there in 1336, outliving her brothers. She is known to have had sisters, who were illegitimate. Their names and fates are unknown. Edward I considered sending them to Lincolnshire convents; whether he did so is not clear.
