= Ulverscroft Priory =

Ruined hermitage & priory in Ulverscroft, Leicestershire, England

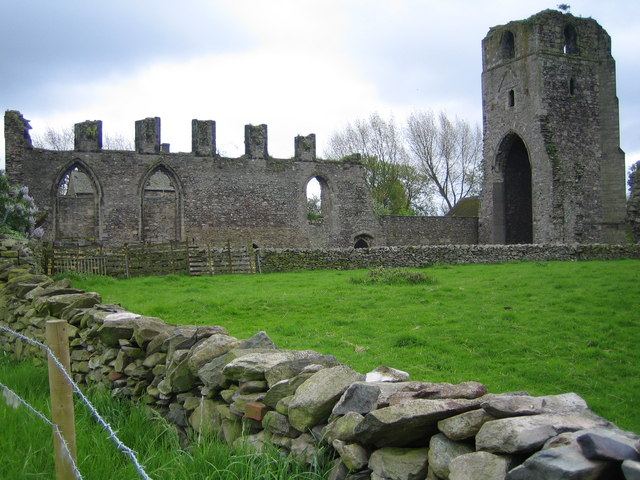
- Ulverscroft Priory

- Location within Leicestershire
- Interactive map of Ulverscroft Priory

Monastery information
- Order: Augustinian
- Established: Hermitage Founded: 1139; Monastery Founded: before 1174
- Disestablished: 1539
- Dedication: St Mary
- Diocese: Diocese of Lincoln
- Controlled churches: Charley Priory

People
- Founder: Robert de Beaumont, 2nd Earl of Leicester

Site
- Location: Ulverscroft, Leicestershire, England
- Coordinates: 52.709889°N 1.259861°W
- Visible remains: Partial Ruins remain
- Public access: NO: Private Property

Ulverscroft Priory is a former hermitage and priory in Ulverscroft, Leicestershire.

== History ==
The priory was founded by Robert de Beaumont, 2nd Earl of Leicester, in 1139, as a hermitage for eremites of the Order of St Augustine. Before 1174, following a papal order, it became an Augustinian priory.

The priory gained the advowson of the church at Stanford on Soar in Nottinghamshire before 1174, however the priory lost it by 1280, following a dispute. In 1323 William de Ferrers donated "70 acres of waste land at Groby" and the advowson of Syston Church, both in Leicestershire. Thomas de Ferrers donated the advowson of Bunny church, in Nottinghamshire, in 1345.

The first 12th-century priory was probably built of wood. The 13th and 14th-century buildings are built of Charnwood Forest Stone.

Around 1220 there were only three canons at the priory. In 1438 the number had risen to eight, and in 1532 the priory was home to nine canons and the prior.

Around 1465 the small, nearby Charley Priory was merged with Ulverscroft.

In 1535 Ulverscroft was recorded as having an annual income of £83 and was thus scheduled to be dissolved with the other smaller priories. However, because its reputation was good, the priory was allowed to continue functioning upon payment of a fine of £166. 13s. 4d. Ulverscroft was finally dissolved in September 1539. The last Prior, Geoffrey Whalley, was granted an annual pension of £20.

In 1543 the former priory was granted to Thomas Manners, 1st Earl of Rutland.

Ruins of the priory church and tower remain. The prior's lodging and refectory are incorporated into a farmhouse constructed on the site. The priory's door was reused at Thornton Church. The site was purchased in 1927 by Sir William Lindsay Everard, preserving the decaying ruins from total destruction. The priory ruins are on private land and are not open to the public.

=== Priors of Ulverscroft Priory ===
List of known Priors of Ulverscroft Priory:

- William, occurs 1174.
- Walter, occurs about 1230.
- Thomas, resigned 1268.
- William of Spondon, admitted 1268, became a Franciscan 1276.
- Robert of Gaddesby, admitted 1276, occurs 1288.
- John of Normanton, elected and resigned 1304.
- Walter of Evesham, elected 1304, resigned 1315.
- Roger of Glen, elected 1315, died 1338.
- Roger of Shepshed, elected 1338, occurs to 1367.
- Thomas of Lockington, died 1387.
- John Ruydyngton, elected 1387, occurs 1395.
- John Annesley, occurs 1433, resigned 1439.
- John Pollesworth, admitted 1439, occurs 1450.
- John Whatton, occurs from 1466 to 1492.
- Robert Whaton, occurs 1492 or 1493.
- William Shepeston, occurs, from 1502 to 1511.
- Geoffrey Whalley, occurs 1524.
- William Bradebern, occurs 1525.
- Edward Dalby, occurs 1534, surrendered the priory, 1539.

== Burials ==
- Henry Ferrers, 2nd Baron Ferrers of Groby
- William Ferrers, 3rd Baron Ferrers of Groby
- William Ferrers, 5th Baron Ferrers of Groby
- Isabel de Verdun, Baroness Ferrers of Groby
