= Six Hills (disambiguation) =

Six Hills, Sixhills, and Six Hill may refer to:

- Six Hills, a collection of Roman barrows in Hertfordshire, England
- Sixhills, a village in Lincolnshire, England
- Six Hill, West Virginia, an unincorporated community in Ritchie County

== See also ==
- Sixhills Priory, in Lincolnshire, England
