= Adam of Harcarse =

Scottish Abbott

- Abbot of Melrose
- Church: Roman Catholic Church
- In office: 1219 – 1245
- Predecessor: Radulf II
- Successor: Matthew
- Previous post(s): Abbot of Newbattle

Personal details
- Died: Missing required parameter 1=month! 1245; Melrose

Adam of Harcarse (died 1245) was a 13th-century Cistercian Abott. He served as Abbot of Newbattle between 1216 and 1219 and then Abbot of Melrose from 1219 until his death in 1245.

== Biography ==
Adam was a cellarer at Newbattle Abbey before he succeeded Richard as the Abbot of Newbattle Abbey on 20 August 1216, serving until he was elected Abbot of Melrose Abbey on 6 August 1219. During 1235, he accompanied Patrick II, Earl of Dunbar with a Scottish army together with Gilbert, the Bishop of Galloway, to quell the revolt in Galloway and forced the submission of Tomás mac Ailein and Gille Ruadh.
