= Elizabeth Ferrers =

- Born: c. 1250
- Died: c. 1300
- Spouses: William Marshal, 2nd Baron Marshal; Dafydd ap Gruffydd
- Issue: Llywelyn, Owain, Gwladys
- Father: William de Ferrers, 5th Earl of Derby
- Mother: Margaret de Quincy

Elizabeth Ferrers (c. 1250 – c. 1300) was a daughter of William de Ferrers, 5th Earl of Derby, and his second wife Margaret de Quincy (born 1218). Her maternal grandparents were Roger de Quincy, 2nd Earl of Winchester, and Helen of Galloway.

Elizabeth was married first to William Marshal, 2nd Baron Marshal, and after his death to Dafydd ap Gruffydd, a prince of Gwynedd and brother of Llywelyn ap Gruffudd. Dafydd was at that time in favour with King Edward I of England, but later rebelled and was executed in 1283. Elizabeth's fate is not known for certain, but she is thought to have been buried at the parish church in Caerwys, north Wales, where local tradition identifies a stone effigy on display in the church as hers.

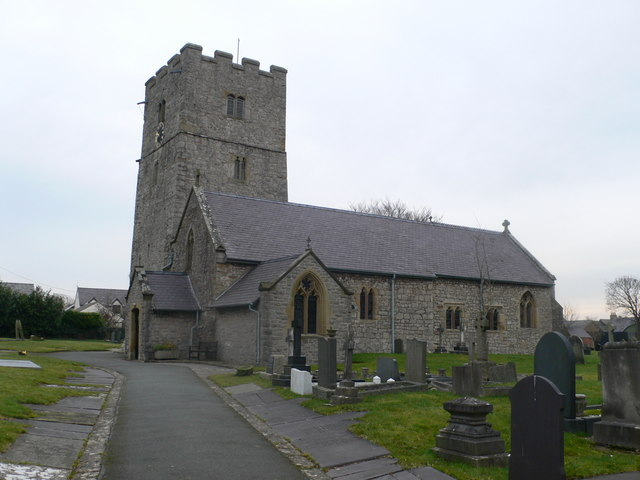
St Michael's Church, Caerwys: Within the church is the cover slab of a tomb reputed to have been that of Elizabeth Ferrers, the wife of Dafydd ap Gruffudd, prince of Wales.

Elizabeth's daughter Gwladys was sent to Sixhills convent for the rest of her life. Her husband Dafydd is thought to have had other daughters who may have been illegitimate. Her sons Llywelyn and Owain were imprisoned and never released.
