= Roger de Vaux =

Roger de Vaux was an English nobleman. He held lands in Clifton, Cotham and Sibthorpe in Nottinghamshire.

== Life ==
Vaux was the youngest son of Oliver de Vaux and Pernel de Craon. His father was prominent in the baronial opposition to King John of England in 1215. His elder brothers Robert and William died without issue, with his older bother John succeeding to his fathers estates and as baron. Roger was succeeded by his eldest son John.

== Marriage and issue ==
Roger married Clemence, the widow of Roger de Scales. Her parentage is unknown. They had the following issue:

- John de Vaux of Clifton, married Constance and whose son John served as Sheriff of Nottinghamshire, Derbyshire and the Royal Forests.
- Nicholas de Vaux of Yelvertoft. The Baron Vaux of Harrowden family descend from Nicholas.
- Petronilla de Vaux
