= Isabel de Verdun, Baroness Ferrers of Groby =

Baroness Ferrers of Groby from 1343 to 1328

Isabel de Verdun
- Baroness Ferrers of Groby
- Born: 21 March 1317; Amesbury Priory, Wiltshire, England
- Died: 25 July 1349 (aged 32)
- Noble family: Verdun
- Spouse: Henry Ferrers, 2nd Baron Ferrers of Groby (m. 1328)
- Issue: William Ferrers, 3rd Baron Ferrers of Groby; Ralph de Ferrers; Elizabeth de Ferrers; Philippa de Ferrers
- Father: Theobald de Verdun, 2nd Baron Verdun
- Mother: Lady Elizabeth de Clare

Isabel de Verdun, Baroness Ferrers of Groby (21 March 1317 – 25 July 1349) was an English heiress, who was related to the English royal family as the eldest daughter of Elizabeth de Clare, herself a granddaughter of King Edward I of England. When she was a child, Isabel was imprisoned in Barking Abbey, along with her mother and half-sister, after her stepfather had joined the Earl of Lancaster's ill-fated rebellion against King Edward II. She is occasionally referred to as Heiress of Ludlow. Her husband was Henry Ferrers, 2nd Baron Ferrers of Groby.

== Family and lineage ==
Isabel was born at Amesbury Priory, Wiltshire, on 21 March 1317, the posthumous and only child of the marriage of Theobald de Verdun, 2nd Baron Verdun, Justiciar of Ireland and Lady Elizabeth de Clare. She was born eight months after her father died of typhoid on 27 July 1316.

Her mother Elizabeth was her father Theobald's second wife, his first wife having been Maud Mortimer (c.1289- 18 September 1312). Isabel had three half-sisters from her father's prior marriage, Joan de Verdun, Elizabeth de Verdun, and Margery de Verdun. Isabel, along with her three de Verdon half-sisters, was a co-heiress of her father.

Her father Theobald was her mother Elizabeth's second husband; her first husband, John de Burgh, had died in a minor skirmish in Galway in Ireland on 18 June 1313. She had a son by de Burgh, William Donn de Burgh, 3rd Earl of Ulster (17 September 1312- 6 June 1333), who was Isabel's uterine half-brother. William would later marry Maud of Lancaster, by whom he had a daughter Elizabeth de Burgh, suo jure 4th Countess of Ulster (6 July 1332- 10 December 1363). Following the death of her brother Gilbert at Bannockburn in 1314 and he leaving no surviving issue, her mother Elizabeth, along with her mother's two sisters, Margaret and Eleanor, became the greatest heiresses in England. King Edward II of England, ordered Elizabeth to return to England, where he planned to select a husband for her from among his supporters. Theobald abducted Elizabeth from Bristol Castle in early 1316, and married her shortly afterwards on 4 February, to the fury of King Edward.

After her husband Theobold's death, Elizabeth, pregnant with Verdun's child, fled to Amesbury Priory and placed herself under the protection of her aunt, Mary de Burgh, who was one of the nuns. It was there that she gave birth to Isabel. Isabel's birth is recorded in an entry of King Edward II's Wardrobe Accounts, as well as the King's gift of a silver-gilt cup which valued at one pound, ten shillings.

Her paternal grandparents were Theobald de Verdun, 1st Lord Verdun and Margery de Bohun, and her maternal grandparents were Gilbert de Clare, 6th Earl of Hertford, 3rd Earl of Gloucester, and Joan of Acre, the daughter of King Edward I of England and Eleanor of Castile.

== Despenser War and imprisonment ==
On 3 May 1317, when Isabel was just about six weeks old, her mother married Sir Roger D'Amory, Lord D'Amory, Baron of Armoy (c.1290 – 14 March 1322). He was a favourite of King Edward II, who encouraged the match. Isabel's wardship and marriage rights were awarded to her stepfather.

From her mother's marriage to D'Amory, Isabel had a uterine half-sister, Elizabeth D'Amory, (born shortly before 23 May 1318 – 5 February 1361), who would later marry Sir John Bardolf, by whom she had issue. Following D'Amory's participation in the Earl of Lancaster's rebellion of 1322, against his former friend and patron, the King and the latter's new favourites, the Despensers, Isabel's wardship and marriage rights were forfeit to the Crown and eventually passed to Queen Isabella.

Isabel's aunt Eleanor de Clare was married to Hugh le Despenser the Younger, who had angered her stepfather after seizing the larger portion of the vast de Clare inheritance for himself. On account of Despenser's greed and increasing influence over the king, D'Amory joined forces with Roger Mortimer and the other disgruntled Marcher Lords becoming one of the key figures in the resulting Despenser War. Roger D'Amory died on 14 March 1322, two days before the Battle of Boroughbridge where Lancaster and the rebels were defeated by the Royalist forces.

Isabel, not quite five years old, together with her half-sister Elizabeth and their mother, was imprisoned at Barking Abbey.

== Marriage ==
Isabel married Henry de Ferrers, 2nd Baron Ferrers of Groby (b. before 1303, d. 15 September 1343) in 1328 at Newbold Verdon, Leicestershire. He was the son of William Ferrers, 1st Baron Ferrers of Groby and Ellen de Segrave. She was eleven years old at the time of her marriage.

The marriage produced at least five children, four of whom survived infancy. Following the birth of her eldest child in February 1331, when Isabel was not quite 14 years of age, her mother sent her presents for her "churching". This was a special religious ceremony performed for the benefit of a woman shortly after childbirth. The child, whose sex was not recorded, died in early infancy.

=== Issue ===
- Infant (b. February 1331), whose name and sex is not known, died shortly after birth.
- William Ferrers, 3rd Baron Ferrers of Groby (28 February 1333 – 8 January 1371), married Margaret de Ufford, daughter of Robert d'Ufford, 1st Earl of Suffolk and Margaret de Norwich, by whom he had issue, including Henry de Ferrers, 4th Lord Ferrers of Groby, who married Joan de Hoo, and Margaret de Ferrers, who married Thomas de Beauchamp, 12th Earl of Warwick.
- Elizabeth de Ferrers (died 22 October 1375), married firstly David de Strathbogie, 12th Earl of Atholl, by whom she had issue. She married secondly, John Malewayn.
- Philippa de Ferrers (died 10 August 1384), married Guy de Beauchamp, son of Thomas de Beauchamp, 11th Earl of Warwick and Katherine Mortimer, by whom she had two daughters.

== Death ==
Isabel died on 25 July 1349 of the plague. Her husband had died on 15 September 1343 and was buried in Ulvescroft Priory.

== Sources ==
- Blanton, Virginia (2010). Signs of Devotion: The Cult of St. Æthelthryth in Medieval England, 695-1615. Pennsylvania State University Press.
