= Oliver de Vaux =

English nobleman

Arms of Oliver de Vaux: Chequy argent and gules

Oliver de Vaux (died 1244) Patron of Pentney, was a 13th-century English nobleman.

== Life ==
Vaux was a son of Robert de Vaux. Oliver accompanied King John of England to Ireland in 1210; however, he joined the barons against King John in 1215. He attended the meetings of the barons at Stamford and Brackley. Vaux also was part of King Henry III of England's army that invaded Poitou in 1230.

== Family ==
Vaux married Petronilla, the widow of William de Longchamp and Henry de Mara, the daughter and heir of Guy de Croun, and Isabella de Basset, they are known to have had the following issue:

- Robert de Vaux, died without issue
- William de Vaux of Tharston and Wisset, married Eleanor de Ferrers, died without issue
- John de Vaux, married Sybilla, had issue
- Roger de Vaux of Clifton, Cotham and Sibthorpe, married Clementia, had issue
- Elianore de Vaux
