= Baron Ferrers =

Baron Ferrers may refer to:

- Baron Ferrers of Chartley
- Baron Ferrers of Groby
