= Galloway revolt of 1234–1235 =

Revolt in Galloway

Date	1234–1235
Location	Galloway
Result	Revolt suppressed

Belligerents
Fergusan Dynasty	Kingdom of Scotland

Commanders and leaders
Tomás mac Ailein (surrendered); Gille Ruadh (surrendered)	Alexander II; Fearchar, Earl of Ross; Walter Comyn, Lord of Badenoch; Patrick II, Earl of Dunbar

The Galloway revolt of 1234–1235 was an uprising in Galloway during 1234–1235, led by Tomás mac Ailein and Gille Ruadh. The uprising was in response to the succession of Alan of Galloway, whereby King Alexander II of Scotland ordered Galloway to be divided the amongst Alan's three heiresses under Norman feudal law. This judgement excluded Alan's illegitimate son Tomás, who believed he was the rightful heir under the Gaelic system of tanistry. Alexander II responded by leading an army into Galloway to crush the rebellion. The Scottish army was almost routed, however was saved by the arrival of Fearchar, Earl of Ross and his forces. Walter Comyn, Lord of Badenoch was left to mop up the revolt, however was forced to abandon the region. Patrick II, Earl of Dunbar led another army in 1235, with Adam, Abbot of Melrose, and Gilbert, Bishop of Galloway and forced the submission of Tomás and Gille.

== Background ==
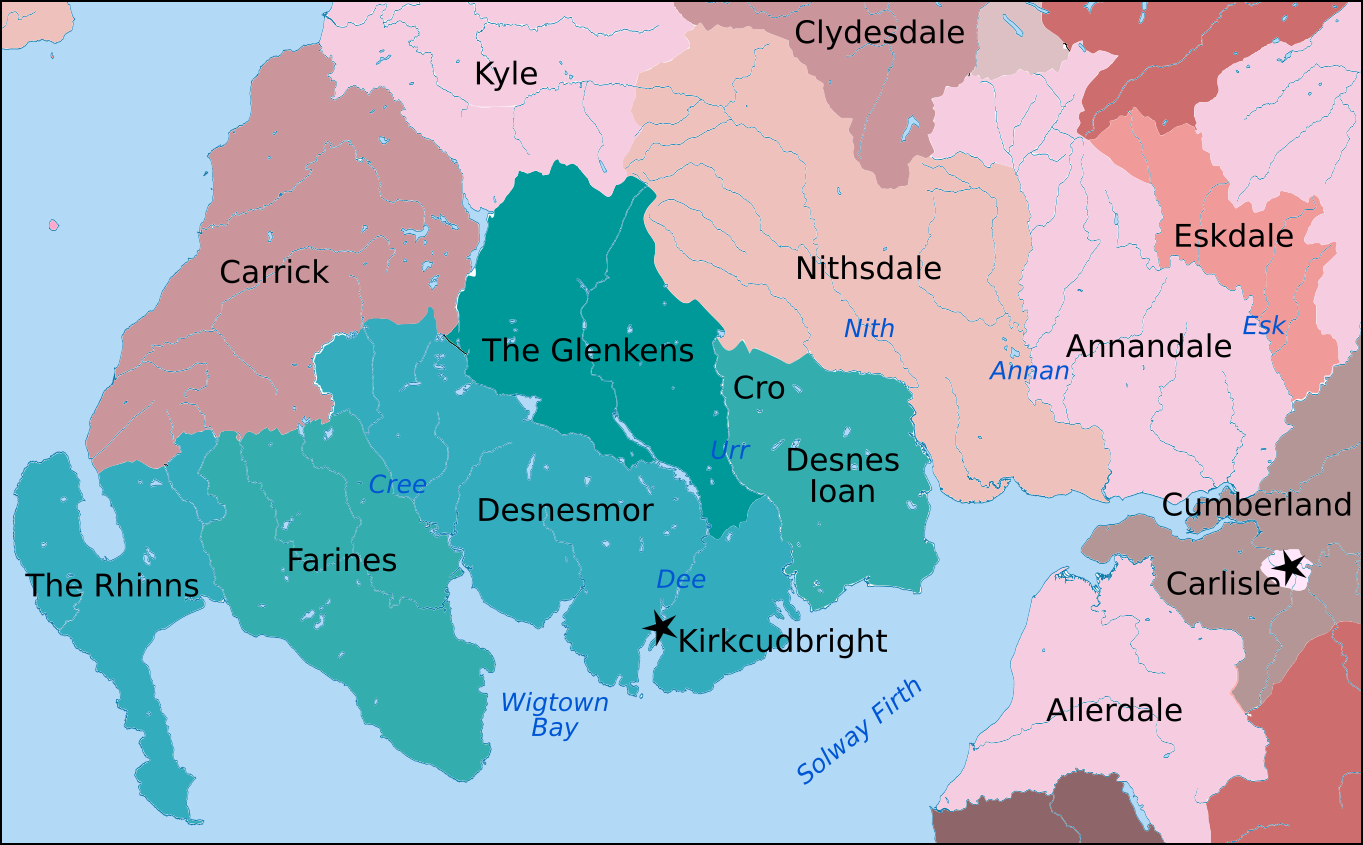
Extent of the Lordship of Galloway (coloured green) and surrounding lordships in the thirteenth century.

Galloway during the 12th–13th century was a Norse-Gaelic (Gall-Ghàidheal) dominant society. Upon the death in 1234 of Lord Alan of Galloway, who had held the position of Constable of Scotland, Alexander II determined that Alan's inheritance would be divided between his three legitimate daughters and their husbands. Alan's illegitimate son Tomás, believed that he should inherit, under the rules of tanistry. Alexander II rejected Tomás‘a claim, dividing Galloway amongst Alan's daughters, Ela married to Roger de Quincy, Dervorguilla married to John I de Balliol and Christiana married to William de Forz.

== Revolt ==
The Galloway lords and landholders supported Tomás's claim over that of Alexander II's feudalism partitioning of Galloway and joined a revolt against Alexander II.

Tomás, along with his associate Gille Ruadh wished to maintain Galloway's status as an independent sub-kingdom.

Alexander II raised an army and invaded Galloway in July 1235. The magnates accompanying Alexander II, were: Walter Fitz Alan, High Steward of Scotland, Justiciar of Scotia (died 1244), Walter Olifard, Justiciar of Lothian (died 1242), Walter Comyn, jure uxoris Earl of Mentieth (died 1258), Máel Coluim, Earl of Angus and Caithness (died 1240), Walter Bisset, Lord of Aboyne (died 1251) and Alan Durward (died c. 1265). The Scottish army was ambushed near Kenmore and was in danger of being routed, however the appearance of Fearchar, Earl of Ross with his forces, at the rear of the Galloway army, forced the Gallwegian army to flee. Gille Ruadh and Tomás escaped to Ireland.

After leaving Walter Comyn in charge to subdue the province, Alexander II returned into Scotland and proceeded to Berwick, for his sister Marjorie's impending wedding to Gilbert Marshal, Earl of Pembroke, which occurred on 1 August. Comyn went about ravaging the rebels lands in Galloway, as well as sacking the monastic establishments at Glenluce Abbey and Tongland Abbey, for supporting the rebellion.

Tomás and Gille Ruadh returned from Ireland with a new army, forcing Comyn to flee Galloway. This forced Patrick II, Earl of Dunbar to lead a Scottish army, with Adam, Abbot of Melrose, and Gilbert, Bishop of Galloway into Galloway. Patrick II, with the Abbot and Bishop, former friends of Alan of Galloway, were able to force the submission of Tomás and Gille.

== Aftermath ==
The revolt's failure ensured that the Lordship of Galloway was no longer a united and distinct sub-kingdom of northern Britain and fell under the control of the Kingdom of Scotland. Tomás was sent to confinement in Edinburgh Castle, before being released and spending his days in captivity at Barnard Castle in England, as a hostage of his sister Dervorguilla.
