= Groby Old Hall =

House in Groby, Leicestershire, England

Coordinates: 52.6632°N 1.2268°W

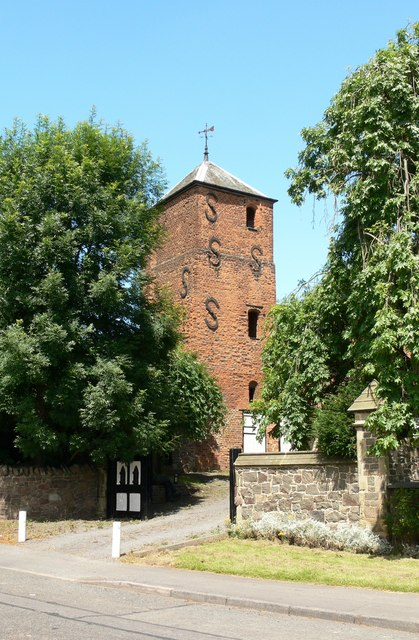
Groby Old Hall

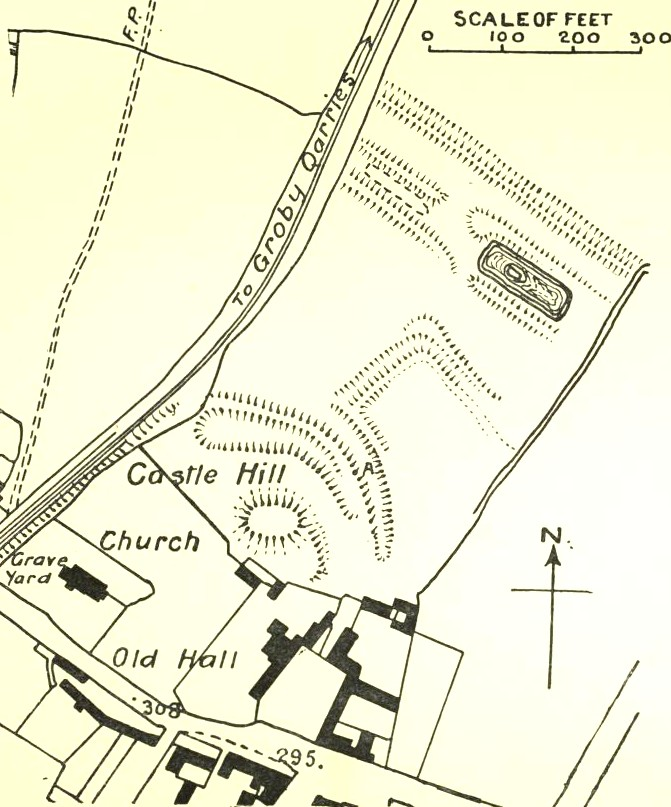
Position of Groby Old Hall relative to Groby Castle, destroyed circa 1175

Groby Old Hall is partly a 15th-century brick-built manor house and grade II* listed building located very near the site of Groby Castle in the village of Groby in Leicestershire.

== History ==
The grand hall which preceded the current building was probably built by the Ferrers family, Barons of Groby, the 1st Baron Ferrers of Groby having been ennobled for services to Edward I and Edward II. The Hall and Barony passed to the Greys by marriage after Sir Edward Grey married Elizabeth Ferrers, granddaughter and heir to the 5th Baron Ferrers, around 1432. The Grey family's most celebrated members were the two Queens of England: Elizabeth Woodville and Lady Jane Grey.

Elizabeth Woodville married Sir Edward Grey's son John, joining him at Groby, where they had two sons. After John's death in battle at the Second Battle of St Albans in 1461, she petitioned King Edward IV for return of her confiscated lands, and won not just her case but his heart and hand in marriage. As Queen she set about promoting the causes of her Woodville relatives, her sons by John Grey, and her children by Edward IV, with mixed results. Of the royal children, the two boys (Edward V and Richard of Shrewsbury) became the ill-fated Princes in the Tower, whereas her daughter, also Elizabeth, married the victor of Bosworth Field, Henry VII, uniting the houses of Lancaster and York to end the Wars of the Roses. Elizabeth Woodville lived to see the birth of three royal grandchildren: Prince Arthur, Margaret, Queen of Scotland, and the future Henry VIII.

She also saw her son Thomas Grey promoted through court, first as Earl of Huntingdon, and then in 1475, Marquess of Dorset. Following Edward IV's death, and the rise of Richard III he found himself in exile in France, where he joined Henry Tudor, as a valued but untrustworthy supporter of the Lancastrian cause. When Henry Tudor defeated Richard III in 1485, Thomas Grey maintained a precarious position within the new court, but found the means to upgrade his ancestral manor at Groby. It appears he started work on a new brick gatehouse on the same site as the manor, which later became part of what is now the 'Old Hall'. However, he rapidly expanded his plans by beginning an entirely new, red brick, great house in his hunting park at Bradgate, several miles away, which was completed by his son some time after his death in 1501. Bradgate House became the Greys' home for the next 240 years, with some disruptions around 1554, and it was at Bradgate that Thomas Grey's great-granddaughter, Lady Jane Grey was born and brought up.

Groby Old Hall, which may incorporate much earlier remains, remained a key part of the Groby estate, and shared in the changing fortunes of the Grey family. The point at which the former grand hall was demolished is unknown, and was the subject of an inconclusive Time Team dig broadcast in 2011. The red-brick gatehouse became what is now known as the 'Old Hall', and is one of England's earliest brick buildings.

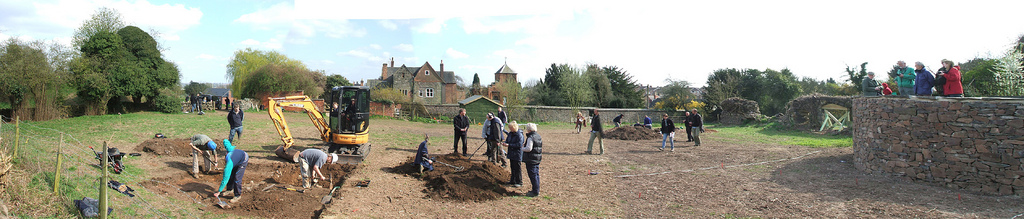
Time Team at Groby Old Hall, 2010

== Groby Hall in art and culture ==
The ancestral seat associated with the protagonist Christopher Tietjens in Ford Madox Ford's tetralogy set in the First World War, Parade's End, published in 1925 (and dramatized for television by the BBC/HBO in 2012), is named Groby Hall. The stately home, with an ancient Great Tree growing in the grounds, is, however, fictionally located in the North Riding of Yorkshire.

"They say,' the boy said, 'that the well at Groby is three hundred and twenty feet deep, and the cedar at the corner of the house a hundred and sixty. The depth of the well twice the height of the tree!"

excerpted from Part VI of the third novel A Man Could Stand Up –

It is likely that Ford based his Groby Hall, including the Great Tree, not on Groby Old Hall in Leicestershire but on the Marwood family seat of Busby Hall, near Stokesley.

== See also ==
- Baron Ferrers of Groby
- Elizabeth Woodville
- John Grey of Groby
- Thomas Grey, 1st Marquess of Dorset
- Bradgate Park
