= 5th Earl of Derby =

5th Earl of Derby may refer to:

- William de Ferrers, 5th Earl of Derby (about 1193–1254), English nobleman and major landowner
- Ferdinando Stanley, 5th Earl of Derby (1559–1594), English nobleman and politician
