= Dafydd ap Gruffudd =

Prince of Gwynedd from 1282 to 1283

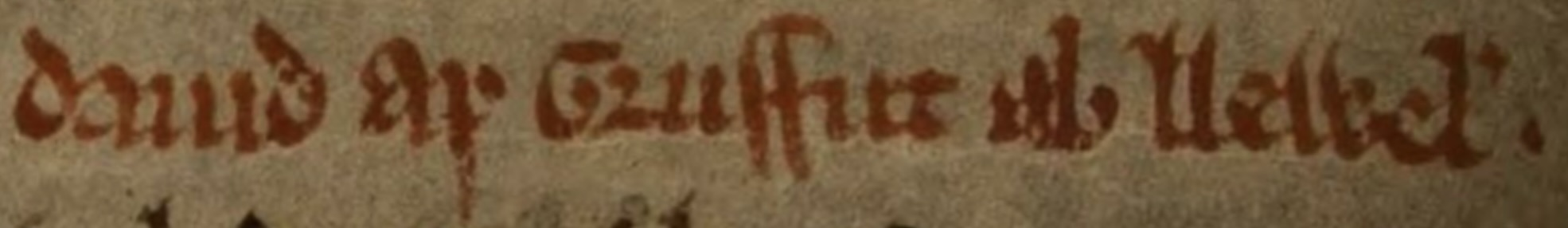
- Dafydd's name in the rubric of an elegy to him in the Hendregadredd Manuscript

Prince of Gwynedd
- Reign: 11 December 1282 – 22 June 1283
- Predecessor: Llywelyn ap Gruffudd
- Successor: Abolished

Prince of Wales
- Reign: 11 December 1282 – 22 June 1283
- Predecessor: Llywelyn ap Gruffudd
- Successor: Pretender: Madog ap Llywelyn; English title: Edward of Carnarvon
- Died: 3 October 1283; Pride Hill, Shrewsbury, England; 52.708856°N 2.752414°W
- Spouse: Elizabeth Ferrers
- Issue: Amongst others: Llywelyn ap Dafydd; Owain ap Dafydd; Gwladys ferch Dafydd
- House: Second Dynasty of Gwynedd
- Father: Gruffudd ap Llywelyn ap Iorwerth
- Mother: Senana ferch Caradog

Dafydd ap Gruffudd (Note: Archaically known as Dafydd III or David III in English.) (died 3 October 1283) was Prince of Gwynedd and Prince of Wales from the death of his brother Llywelyn ap Gruffudd on 11 December 1282 until his capture on 22 June 1283. He became a fugitive after waging war against the English occupation of Wales, but was captured, and then hanged, drawn and quartered on 3 October 1283, which were on the orders of King Edward I of England. He was the last native Prince of Wales before the conquest of Wales by Edward I in 1283.

== Early life ==
Dafydd was a prince of Gwynedd, the third of four sons of Gruffudd ap Llywelyn and his wife, Senana, and thus grandson of Llywelyn Fawr. In 1241, he was handed over to Henry III of England as a hostage with his younger brother, Rhodri, as part of an agreement to secure the release of his father, Gruffudd, who had been imprisoned by his half brother, Dafydd ap Llywelyn. His brother, Owain, made him captain of his household troops when Dafydd came of age, and in 1252 Owain invested him as lord of the commote of Cymydmaen, at the western end of the Llŷn Peninsula. In 1253, he was called upon to pay homage to King Henry III of England, where he received an offer of support from Henry, should he secure himself claims to a greater portion of the territory of Gwynedd. This, however, was opposed by his brother Llywelyn.

In 1255, he joined his brother, Owain, in a challenge to their brother, Llywelyn, but Llywelyn defeated them at the Battle of Bryn Derwin. Dafydd and Owain were imprisoned, but Llywelyn released Dafydd the following year and restored him to favour, bestowing on him landholdings in Perfeddwlad, an area recently captured from Henry. Dafydd thus acknowledged Llywelyn's right to bestow these lands, aligning the interests of the two brothers. Dafydd served his brother loyally until, in 1263, secret negotiations with Henry's son, Edward, persuaded Dafydd to join Henry in an attack on his brother. The following year, Henry found himself under siege from a group of his rebellious barons, and Llywelyn used the situation to assert his status as Prince of Wales in 1267. Henry acknowledged him as Prince of Wales. Dafydd was again restored to Llywelyn's favour, but in 1274, he conspired with Gruffudd ap Gwenwynwyn to kill Llywelyn. Llywelyn was alerted to the plot and called Dafydd to answer charges of treason, but he fled to the court of Edward I, who had succeeded Henry in 1272. In 1277, following the Treaty of Aberconwy, Dafydd was reconciled, finally, with his brother.

Dafydd ap Gruffudd married (sometime after 1265) Lady Elizabeth Ferrers, daughter of William de Ferrers, 5th Earl of Derby, and the widow of William Marshal, 2nd Baron Marshal (not the Earl of Pembroke). Through the marriage, Dafydd came into possession of the manor of Folesham, Norfolk. He exchanged Folesham with John Marshal for the manor of Norton, Northamptonshire. In September 1278, he accepted a grant for life from Edward l, King of England, of the manor of Frodsham, near Chester.

== Struggle for Wales ==
On Palm Sunday, 1282, Dafydd ap Gruffudd attacked Rhuddlan and Hawarden castles, capturing the latter. Other Welsh princes took this opportunity to rise in rebellion. Llywelyn, following initial hesitation, joined Dafydd's rebellion, triggering the second war of Welsh independence. Archbishop John Peckham tried to intervene in the war by suggesting that Llywelyn accept land in England in return for surrendering to Edward I, while Dafydd was supposed to go on crusade at the king's expense. Both princes turned the offer down. In December his older brother Llywelyn ap Gruffudd, Prince of Wales, was killed by the English on 11 December 1282. (Note: see corr. of Archbishop John Peckham, Lambeth Palace Archives) Dafydd succeeded Llywelyn as Prince of Wales and held the title for a little more than seven months after his brother's death.

By January 1283, Edward I of England surrounded Dafydd's base of Snowdonia with a massive army. Dafydd initially operated from Dolwyddelan and was supported by various royal refugees from Powys Fadog and Deheubarth; including Rhys Wyndod, Rhys Ieuanc and the sons of Maredudd ab Owain. With limited resources of manpower and equipment available the passes leading to Dolwyddelan became indefensible and Dafydd moved down to Castell y Bere. In April, Castell y Bere was besieged by over 3,000 men, and the small Welsh garrison, commanded by Cynfrig ap Madog, surrendered on 25 April. Dafydd escaped the siege and moved north to Dolbadarn Castle, a guardpost in the Peris Valley at the foot of Snowdon. In May 1283, he was forced to move again, this time to the mountains above the Welsh royal home in Abergwyngregyn.

David with a few followers hid himself for some weeks and suffered hunger and cold. At last, he retreated to a bog (Nanhysglain), near Bera Mawr.

== Capture and execution ==
On 22 June, Dafydd and his younger son Owain ap Dafydd were captured at Nanhysglain, a secret hiding place in a bog near Bera Mawr mountain. Dafydd, seriously wounded in the struggle, (Note: graviter vulneratus') was taken to King Edward's camp at Rhuddlan that same night. (Note: Cotton Vesp. B xi, f30) Dafydd was taken from there to Chester and then on to Shrewsbury. Dafydd's wife Elizabeth Ferrers, their daughter Gwladys, infant niece Gwenllian ferch Llywelyn, Dafydd's other son, and his seven daughters, were also taken prisoner at the same time.

On 28 June, Llywelyn ap Dafydd (son of Dafydd ap Gruffydd) was also captured. Edward triumphantly proclaimed that the last of the "treacherous lineage", princes of the "turbulent nation", was now in his grasp, captured by men of his own language (per homines linguae suae). Welsh resistance to the invasion temporarily came to an end. (Note: Much has been read into this latter statement regarding Llywelyn ap Dafydd's betrayal, but it has to be taken in context with the other events of 1283, the fact that Llywelyn's father and brother had been taken, and the size of the army that had by now occupied Snowdonia.) That day, Edward issued writs to summon a parliament to meet at Shrewsbury, to discuss Dafydd's fate.

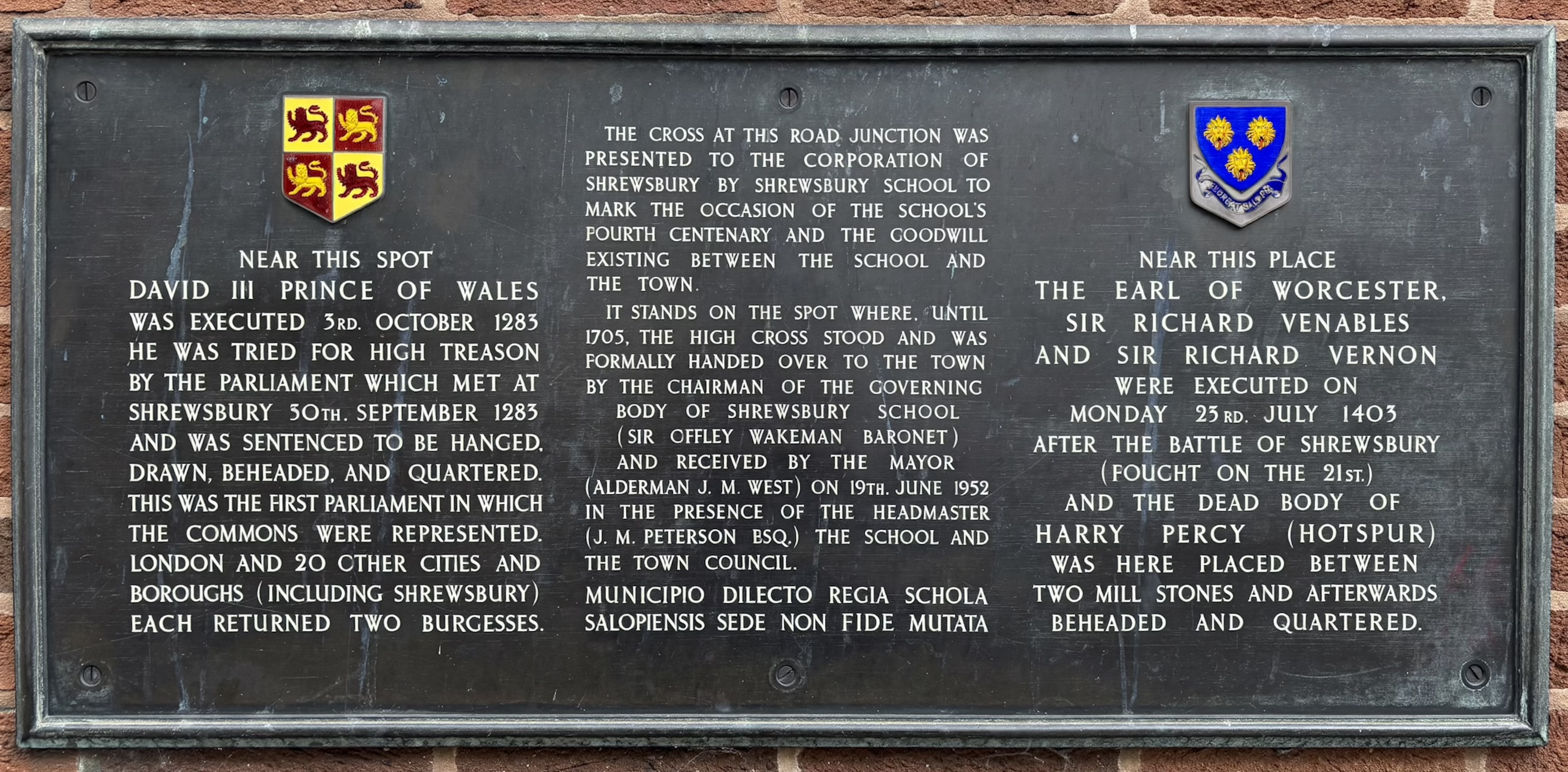
A plaque commemorating Dafydd's execution (archaically called David III), Saint Mary's Street, Shrewsbury.

On 30 September, Dafydd ap Gruffudd, Prince of Wales, was condemned to death, the first person known to have been tried and executed for what from that time onwards would be described as high treason against the King. Edward ensured that Dafydd's death was slow and agonising, and also historic; he became the first prominent person in recorded history to have been hanged, drawn and quartered, preceded by a number of minor knights earlier in the thirteenth century. Dafydd was dragged through the streets of Shrewsbury attached to a horse's tail, then hanged alive, revived, then disembowelled and his entrails burned before him for "his sacrilege in committing his crimes in the week of Christ's passion", and then his body cut into four quarters "for plotting the king's death". Geoffrey of Shrewsbury was paid 20 shillings for carrying out the gruesome act on 3 October 1283.

Dafydd's daughter Gwladys, like her cousin Gwenllian ferch Llywelyn, was sent to a convent in Lincolnshire – Gwenllian to Sempringham and Gwladys to Sixhills, where she died in 1336. Dafydd's sons were both imprisoned at Bristol Castle: Llywelyn ap Dafydd died at Bristol Castle in mysterious circumstances in 1287 or 1288, while Owain ap Dafydd is last found living in August 1305. Non-contemporary genealogies also attribute to Dafydd and an otherwise unknown Welsh woman, Tangwystl ferch Owain Fflam, an illegitimate son named Dafydd Goch of Penmachno, who survived, though there is no contemporary evidence to support the relationship.

One cadet member of the ruling House of Aberffraw also survived, Madog ap Llywelyn, who led a nationwide revolt in 1294–1295. Dafydd's brother's grandson, Owain Lawgoch briefly attempted to regain his position as a prince until 1378.

== Ancestry ==
Ancestors of Dafydd ap Gruffudd

Owain Gwynedd
Iorwerth Drwyndwn
Gwladus ferch Llywarch
Llywelyn ab Iorwerth
Madog ap Maredudd
Margred ferch Madog
Gruffudd ap Llywelyn (ill.)
Iorwerth ap Cynon
Llywarch Goch ab Iorwerth
(NN.) ferch Cadwallon ap Cadrod
Tangwystl Goch ferch Llywarch Goch
Llywarch ap Brân
Tangwystl ferch Llywarch
Rhael ferch Gronwy
Dafydd ap Gruffudd
Rhodri ab Owain Gwynedd
Thomas ap Rhodri
Caradog ap Thomas
Senana ferch Caradog (Note: Senana is not recorded in the early Welsh genealogies.)
Gruffudd ap Beli
Gwyn ap Gruffudd
Efa ferch Gwyn ap Gruffudd

== Arms ==
Coat of arms of Dafydd ap Gruffudd
Notes Recorded in a manuscript perhaps from c. 1279 – 1281. These arms are a differenced version of his elder brother Llywelyn ap Gruffudd's arms. Escutcheon Quarterly Or and Azure, four lions passant counter-changed.

== Succession ==
Dafydd ap Gruffudd Second Dynasty of Gwynedd Born: 11 July 1238 Died: 3 October 1283
Regnal titles
Preceded by Llywelyn ap Gruffudd	Prince of Gwynedd; 1282 – 1283	Succeeded by Abolished
Preceded by Llywelyn ap Gruffudd	Prince of Wales; 1282 – 1283	Succeeded by Pretender: Madog ap Llywelyn; English title: Edward of Carnarvon
