= Cynfrig ap Madog =

Cynfrig ap Madog (fl. 1283) was constable of Castell-y-Bere in the kingdom of Gwynedd, Wales, during the Anglo-Welsh war of 1282-3 that culminated in the loss of Welsh independence. The castle was besieged by an English force under the command of William de Valance on 15 April; on 21 April his men were supplemented by those of Roger Lestrange. On the following day, the pair negotiated for the surrender of the castle by Cynfrig, offering £80 if the defenders yielded within a week. He seemingly agreed, for the castle was surrendered on 25 April and a payment of £53 made, but the prince of Wales, Dafydd ap Gruffudd, was not in it; he apparently escaped during the siege, and was not captured until 22 June. There are no further references to Cynfrig. The siege over which he presided was the longest of a native Welsh castle during the war.

== See also ==
- Dafydd ap Gruffudd
