= Charley Priory =

Former priory in Leicestershire, England

- Location within Leicestershire
- Interactive map of Charley Priory

Monastery information
- Established: Before 1190
- Disestablished: c.1465 (united with nearby Ulverscroft Priory)
- Diocese: Diocese of Lincoln

Site
- Location: Charley, Leicestershire, England
- Coordinates: 52.728184°N 1.291409°W
- Grid reference: SK47951474

Charley Priory was a small former priory in Leicestershire, England.

== History ==
The exact date Charley Priory was established is unknown, but is at some point before 1190. In 1190, Petronilla de Grandmesnil, Countess of Leicester donated the priory to the Benedictine Abbey of Saint-Evroul in Normandy. The gift was confirmed at the beginning of the 13th century, with the abbey under the control of Ware Priory, a subordinate of Saint-Evroul.

In 1220, while under the patronage of the Earl of Winchester, the priory is recorded as a hermitage, and as independent (no longer under the control of another abbey or priory), and as in possession of the advowson of Ratcliffe on the Wreake church. At the time 3 monks lived at the priory but it is unclear if they followed the Augustinian or Benedictine order; as a hermitage they may not have followed any definite rule.

By the late 13th century the priory was considered Augustinian, and in 1291 the abbey was valued at £9. 2s. 9½d.

By 1444 the priory's poor finances had allowed the priory buildings to fall into ruins. In 1465 Sir John Bourchier petitioned the Bishop of Lincoln to allow the priory to be united with the nearby Augustinian Ulverscroft Priory. The priory was dissolved soon after, and united with Ulverscroft. Ulverscroft itself was dissolved in 1539.

Nothing remains of the priory buildings. The dyke however remains, showing the location of the precinct walls.

== Priors of Charley ==
- William, early 13th century.
- Simon, resigned 1264.
- Robert of Grimesby, elected 1264; resigned 1272.
- John of Bawtry, elected 1272.
- Stephen of Keyham, resigned 1291.
- Thomas of Evesham, admitted 1291; resigned 1298.
- Robert of Radcliffe, elected 1298, but confirmation refused by the bishop.
- John of Bawtry, admitted 1298; resigned 1309.
- William of Segrave, elected 1309; died 1318.
- William of Leicester, elected 1318.
- Henry of Stratford, resigned 1335.
- Roger, occurs 1371 and 1386.
- Richard Haitlee, presented 1382.
- John atte Well, occurs before 1390.
- Ralph, occurs 1390 & 1401
- John Ince, admitted 1414.
- John Botyler, admitted 1422.
- John Belton, resigned 1444.
- John Whitewyk, admitted 1444.
- Thomas Frisby, resigned 1458.
- John Zouche, admitted 1458.
