= Theobald de Verdun, 2nd Baron Verdun =

Anglo-Norman Baron

Baron Verdun (in succession to his father) Theobald de Verdun II
- Born: Theobald de Verdun; 8 September 1278
- Died: 27 July 1316 (aged 37); Alton Castle, Staffordshire
- Known for: Justiciar of Ireland
- Spouse(s): Maud (otherwise 'Matilda') Mortimer; Elizabeth de Clare
- Children: est. 6

Theobald de Verdun (1278–1316) was the second and eldest surviving son of Theobald de Verdun, 1st Baron Verdun, of Alton, Staffordshire, and his wife Margery de Bohun. The elder Theobald was the son of John de Verdon, otherwise Le Botiller, of Alton, Staffordshire, who was killed in Ireland in 1278. John, in turn, was the son of Theobald le Botiller and Roesia de Verdun. Roesia was the daughter of Nicholas de Verdun, who was the son of Bertram III de Verdun. When King Henry II of England invaded Ireland in 1171, this Bertram was appointed Seneschal for the undertaking, that is to say, he was responsible for provisions and stores. The Verdun family became major landowners in Ireland, especially in County Louth and County Meath.

Thomas lived mainly in Ireland, and held the office of Justiciar of Ireland in 1314–15. His three brothers rebelled against the Crown in 1312–13, but Theobald himself seems to have remained loyal.

Theobald married as his first wife Maud (otherwise 'Matilda') Mortimer, daughter of Edmund Mortimer, 2nd Baron Mortimer and Margaret Fiennes / de Fenlas.

- John de Verdun. Died young, unmarried and without issue.
- William de Verdun. Died young, unmarried and without issue.
- Joan de Verdun. Married 1st William de Montacute, who died before the marriage was consummated. She married secondly Thomas de Furnival, 2nd Baron Furnivall, of Hallamshire, son of Thomas de Furnival, 1st Baron Furnival and his first wife Joan, daughter of Hugh le Despenser, 1st Baron le Despenser.
- Elizabeth de Verdun. Married Bartholomew Burghersh, 1st Baron Burghersh.
- Margery de Verdun. Married 1st William le Blount, Lord Blount who died in 1337. She married secondly Sir Mark Hussey, son and heir apparent of Henry Hussey, 2nd Baron Hussey. He died before his father in 1345/6. Married as her third husband Sir John de Crophull of Bonnington, Nottinghamshire. By her third husband, they were parents to Thomas de Crophull. They were ancestors to Queen Katherine Parr, the sixth wife of King Henry VIII of England.

Theobald married as his second wife Elizabeth de Clare, widow of John de Burgh, daughter of Gilbert de Clare, 7th Earl of Gloucester (also 6th Earl of Hertford and 9th Lord of Clare) and Joan of Acre, daughter of King Edward I of England and Queen Eleanor of Castile. They had a daughter:

- Isabel de Verdun – born posthumously on 21 March 1316/7 at Amesbury Priory, Wiltshire, after her father's death. She married Henry de Ferrers, 2nd Baron Ferrers of Groby, Leicestershire.

Theobald died of typhoid on Tuesday 27 July 1316 at Alton Castle and was buried at Croxden Abbey on 19 September 1316. His death at the height of the Bruce campaign in Ireland left his Irish lands entirely at the mercy of the invading forces.

The Verdun estates in Ireland passed to his four daughters as co-heiresses. Some of the Verdun estates later came to his surviving brothers, Nicholas and Milo, and passed to their sons.
