= William de Ferrers of Groby =

Arms of William de Ferrers of Groby (as also used by his father William de Ferrers, 5th Earl of Derby): Vairy or and gules, a bordure azure (or sable) charged with eight horseshoes argent

William de Ferrers (c. 1240-1287) of Groby Castle in Leicestershire was the younger son of William de Ferrers, 5th Earl of Derby (c.1193-1254) of Chartley Castle in Staffordshire, by his second wife Margaret de Quincy, daughter and heiress of Roger de Quincy, 2nd Earl of Winchester (c.1195-1264). He founded the line of Ferrers of Groby, having been given Groby Castle by his mother Margaret de Quincy. Having rebelled against King Henry III, he was taken prisoner at the Battle of Northampton in 1264, but was later pardoned. In 1282, He was with King Edward I in the Army of Wales.

== Marriages & issue ==
He married twice:

- Firstly, Anne, whose identity is uncertain, possibly a daughter of Hugh le Despenser, Justiciar of England by his wife Aline Basset (per The Complete Peerage), or of Alan Durward and Margery of Scotland, (per Oxford Dictionary of National Biography). By his first wife he had issue:
  - William Ferrers, 1st Baron Ferrers of Groby (1272-1325), who adopted the arms of his paternal grand-mother de Quincy, in lieu of his paternal arms (Vairy or and gules).
- Secondly, he married Alianore de Lovaine (d.post 1326), a daughter of Matthew de Lovaine, feudal baron of Little Easton in Essex. After Ferrers' death, she was abducted in 1289 and married by Sir William de Duglas (d.1299), who was imprisoned for his action. She married thirdly, before 1305, Sir William Bagot of Hide and Patshull in Staffordshire, whom she survived, and was buried in Dunmow Priory in Essex. Her surviving seal displays the arms of her first husband: Vairy, a bordure charged with horse shoes.
