= GE Measurement & Control =

Business of General Electric specialized in sensing probes

GE Measurement & Control Solutions
- Industry: Aerospace, oil and gas and power generation
- Founded: 2001
- Headquarters: Billerica, MA, U.S.A.
- Key people: Brian Palmer (CEO)
- Number of employees: 11,000
- Parent: Baker Hughes

GE Measurement & Control Solutions is an affiliate business of Baker Hughes specializing in the design and manufacture of sensing elements, devices, instruments, and systems that enable customers to monitor, protect, control, and validate the safety of their critical processes and applications.

Its worldwide headquarters are located in Billerica, Massachusetts. Other key offices and manufacturing plants are located in Fremont, California, Houston, Texas, Lewistown, Pennsylvania, St. Marys, Pennsylvania, Twinsburg, Ohio, Shanghai, China, Tijuana, Mexico, Shannon, Ireland and Groby, UK.

The company has grown in recent years by making a number of strategic acquisitions in key sensor areas such as temperature, pressure, level, and flow sensors. Acquisitions include leading temperature sensor manufacturers Thermometrics, pressure sensor manufacturers Druck and so on.

Druck, GE General Eastern, GE Protimeter, GE Kaye, GE NovaSensor, Panametrics, GE Thermometrics, and GE Ruska are now under one name: GE Industrial Sensing.

The company offers products such as NTC/PTC Thermistors (for temperature sensing), Pressure Sensors, Humidity Sensors, Infrared sensors, Ultrasonic flow sensors besides providing the complete solution for the customers. The current CEO of the company is Mr. Brian Palmer who has worked with GE in an array of roles over 15+ years.
