= Eleanor de Quincy =

English noblewoman (d. 1274)

Eleanor as depicted in the Lambeth Apoclaypse

Eleanor de Quincy (c. 1236 – October 1274) was an English noblewoman. She was one of the heiresses of the Marshal family through her mother and the countess of Winchester by marriage from 1252 (dowager countess after 1264). She was the original owner of the Lambeth Apocalypse.

Eleanor was married three times. Although she is generally known as Eleanor de Quincy in art history, after her highest-ranking husband, she preferred to be known as Eleanor de Vaux after her first husband and is sometimes called Eleanor de Ferrers after her father.

== Life ==
=== Three marriages ===
She was born around 1236, the youngest of seven daughters of William III de Ferrers, earl of Derby, and Sybil Marshal. She was thrice married and thrice widowed. Her first two marriages took place without royal licence and both of her husbands paid fines. Her first husband, William de Vaux, died in May 1252. They had no children. Eleanor continued to use William's family name, de Vaux or de Vallibus, until her death.

Eleanor married her second husband, Roger de Quincy, earl of Winchester, before December 1252. The chronicler Matthew Paris notes that the speed of his marriage was due to Roger's desire for a male heir. He was a widower, having been previously married to Helen of Galloway and Matilda de Bohun. He was the highest in rank of all the thirteen husbands of the seven Ferrers daughters. Eleanor and Roger's marriage created a highly unusual situation. Since Eleanor's father had remarried after her mother's death around 1238 to Margaret, the eldest daughter of William de Ferrers and Helen, Eleanor became the stepmother of her own stepmother. Eleanor and Roger had no children.

After Roger's death in 1264, Eleanor continued to be styled Countess of Winchester until her death. She never adopted his surname, de Quincy (or Quency), preferring her first husband's surname alongside her second husband's title. In 1266, she was granted the manor of Chinnor until she received her dower from Roger's heirs. She married her third husband, Roger de Leybourne, sheriff of Kent, sometime before 1267. This match may have been arranged by King Henry III as a reward for Roger. Roger was preparing to go on crusade before he died in 1271. It is not known if they had any children, but it is unlikely, since he was succeeded by a son from an earlier marriage and Eleanor's heirs were her surviving sisters.

=== Widow ===
In November 1271, Eleanor complained to the king that his escheators had seized all of her lands, both those she had inherited as a Marshal on her mother's side and the three dowers she had acquired through her three marriages. The king ordered Roger de Leybourne's dower handed over immediately and ordered an investigation into Eleanor's other claims. Eleanor thus received the dower from her third husband within the forty-day limit laid down in Magna Carta. She was not so fortunate in her other dowers. She and her third husband had been seeking her dower from the earl of Winchester since 1267, but the Quency heiresses disputed it until her death. She never received the dower from her second husband and so held the manor of Chinnor in lieu of it until her death.

In February 1272, Eleanor authorized Godfrey Giffard and Ralph de Sandwich to appoint attorneys to act on her behalf while she was away in Scotland.

Between 1271 and 1274, Eleanor and her sisters Margaret and Agatha litigated a dispute with their sister Agnes over the county of Kildare, of which they were coparceners. In January 1273, Eleanor appeared before the court in Ireland but Agnes was absent. Eleanor had previously taken an active interest in her Irish lands, perhaps as early as 1264, appointing attorneys to act in her absence. Eleanor died in October 1274 before the case was resolved the following February.

== Lambeth Apocalypse ==
Eleanor has been identified as the patron and donor behind the Lambeth Apocalypse, a deluxe illuminated manuscript containing the Book of Revelation with the commentary of Berengaudus and a collection of miracles of the Virgin Mary. She is depicted in a donor portrait on folio 48r wearing the wimple and veil of a married woman, an undergarment bearing the arms of the Ferrers family and a cloak bearing the arms of the de Quincy family. Eleanor is also depicted on folio 15v. Both times she is depicted reading.

== Bibliography ==
- Gee, Loveday Lewes (2002). Women, Art, and Patronage from Henry III to Edward III, 1216–1377. The Boydell Press.
- Kauffmann, C. M. (1991). "An Apocalypse in Facsimile". Art History. 14 (3): 451–454. doi:10.1111/j.1467-8365.1991.tb00451.x.
- Kersey, Harriet Lily (2017). Aristocratic Female Inheritance and Property Holding in Thirteenth-Century England (PDF) (PhD diss.). Canterbury Christ Church University.
- Michael, Michael (1992). "Review of Morgan 1990". The Antiquaries Journal. 72: 218–219. doi:10.1017/S0003581500071560.
- Morgan, Nigel (1990). The Lambeth Apocalypse, Manuscript 209 in Lambeth Palace Library: A Critical Study. Harvey Miller.
- Whatley, Laura J. (2022). "Eleanor de Quincy and Imagined Crusading in the Lambeth Apocalypse. (London, Lambeth Palace, MS 209)". In Kathryn Hurlock; Laura J. Whatley (eds.). Crusading and Ideas of the Holy Land in Medieval Britain. Brepols. pp. 171–187. doi:10.1484/M.TCNE-EB.5.129233.
- Wilkinson, Louise J. (2021). "Reformers and Royalists: Aristocratic Women in Politics, 1258–1267". In Adrian Jobson (ed.). Baronial Reform and Revolution in England, 1258–1267. Boydell & Brewer. pp. 152–166.
