= Baron Ferrers of Groby =

Title in the English nobility

Arms of Ferrers, Baron Ferrers of Groby: Gules, seven mascles or conjoined 3:3:1. These are the arms of de Quincy, adopted in lieu of his paternal arms (Vairy or and gules) by William Ferrers, 1st Baron Ferrers of Groby (1272–1325). He was the son and heir of Sir William de Ferrers (1240–1287) of Groby, the younger son of William de Ferrers, 5th Earl of Derby (by his second wife Margaret de Quincy, daughter and heiress of Roger de Quincy, 2nd Earl of Winchester (c.1195-1264)) who founded the line of Baron Ferrers of Groby, having been given Groby Castle by his mother Margaret de Quincy

Arms of Grey, Baron Ferrers of Groby: Barry of six argent and azure, in chief three torteaux

Baron Ferrers of Groby (or Baron Ferrers de Groby) was a title in the Peerage of England. It was created by writ on 29 December 1299 when William Ferrers, 1st Baron Ferrers of Groby was summoned to parliament. He was the son of Sir William de Ferrers, Knt., of Groby, Leicestershire, (d.1287) by his first wife Anne Durward, 2nd daughter of Alan Durward and his wife Margery of Scotland, and grandson of William de Ferrers, 5th Earl of Derby. The first Baron was married to Ellen de Menteith, daughter of Alexander, Earl of Menteith. In 1475 the eighth baron was created the Marquess of Dorset, and the barony in effect merged with the marquessate. It was forfeited along with the marquessate when the third marquess was attainted in 1554.

== Barons Ferrers of Groby (1300) ==
- William Ferrers, 1st Baron Ferrers of Groby (1272–1325)
- Henry Ferrers, 2nd Baron Ferrers of Groby (1303–1343)
- William Ferrers, 3rd Baron Ferrers of Groby (1333–1372)
- Henry Ferrers, 4th Baron Ferrers of Groby (1356–1388)
- William Ferrers, 5th Baron Ferrers of Groby (1373–1445)
- Elizabeth Ferrers, 6th Baroness Ferrers of Groby (1419–1483)
  - Edward Grey, 6th Baron Ferrers of Groby (c. 1415–1457) was summoned to parliament in right of his wife from 14 December 1446 to 26 May 1455 (women were not permitted to attend in their own right)
  - John Bourchier, 6th Baron Ferrers of Groby (died 1495), second husband of the 6th Baroness, also held the title in right of his wife from 1462 to her death in 1483
- Thomas Grey, 7th Baron Ferrers of Groby (1451–1501) (created Marquess of Dorset, 1475), was the son of Sir John Grey of Groby, who was the son of the 6th Baroness and her first husband
- Thomas Grey, 8th Baron Ferrers of Groby, 2nd Marquess of Dorset (1472–1530) was summoned to parliament as Baron Ferrers of Groby in 1509
- Henry Grey, 9th Baron Ferrers of Groby, 1st Duke of Suffolk (1517–1554)

The barony was forfeit in 1554, when the Duke of Suffolk was tried for high treason and executed.

== Barons Grey of Groby ==
- Henry Grey (c. 1547–1614), nephew of Henry Grey Duke of Suffolk, was created Baron Grey of Groby, 21 July 1603.
- Henry Grey, 2nd Baron Grey of Groby (c. 1600–1673) (created Earl of Stamford in 1628)

For further holders of the title see Earl of Stamford
