= Ferrers baronets =

Extinct baronetcy in the Baronetage of England

- Escutcheon of the Ferrers baronets of Skellingthorpe
- Creation date: 1628
- Status: extinct
- Extinction date: 1675

The Ferrers Baronetcy, of Skellingthorpe in the County of Lincoln, was title in the Baronetage of England. It was created on 19 December 1628 for Henry Ferrers. The title became extinct on the death of the second Baronet in 1675.

== Ferrers baronets, of Skellingthorpe (1628) ==
- Sir Henry Ferrers, 1st Baronet (died 1663)
- Sir Henry Ferrers, 2nd Baronet (c. 1630 – 1675)
