= Six Hill, West Virginia =

Six Hill
- Unincorporated community
- Location within the state of West Virginia Six Hill (the United States)
- Coordinates: 39°11′39″N 81°7′57″W
- Country: United States
- State: West Virginia
- County: Ritchie
- Elevation: 922 ft (281 m)
- Time zone: UTC-5 (Eastern (EST))
  - Summer (DST): UTC-4 (EDT)
- GNIS ID: 1555634

Six Hill is an unincorporated community in Ritchie County, West Virginia, United States.
