= John de Vaux =

English nobleman

Arms of John de Vaux: Argent, an escutcheon between eight martlets gules

John de Vaux (died 11 September 1287) also known as John de Vallibus was a 13th-century English nobleman.

== Life ==
Vaux was a son of Oliver de Vaux and Pernel de Craon. John was one of the retinue of Lord Edward until 1259, probably serving in Edward's campaign in Wales. Due to the dismissal of Roger de Leybourne from the service of Lord Edward in 1262, he joined with several other nobles of the baronial opposition under Simon de Montfort, Earl of Leicester. In June 1263, he was one of the nobles who arrested Peter of Aigueblanche, Bishop of Hereford. Vaux returned to royal service (to both King Henry III and Lord Edward), by October 1263; he was one of the witnesses of the agreement between Henry and King Louis IX of France in December 1263.

Vaux fought on the side of King Henry III during the battle of Evesham in August 1265 and received grants of some of the rebel barons seized houses in London. He was a Justice itinerant in 1278. Vaux was appointed as Sheriff of Norfolk and Suffolk and Governor of Norwich Castle; however, in 1285 he owed the crown over £213. Since he could not afford this sum, he was forgiven £80 of his debt, by serving as sheriff. Vaux had been appointed as Seneschal of Gascony in 1283; however, it does not appear that he took office. In 1285 he served as a royal judge. He died on 11 September 1287. (Note: His earliest Norfolk inquisition, taken on Thursday the feast of St.Leonard, 15 Edw.I (6 November 1287) gives the date of his death: "He died on Thursday before the Exaltation of the Holy Cross, 15 Edw. I." The date of the Exaltation of the Holy Cross was 14 September. The regnal calendar for 15 Edward I (20 November 1286 - 19 November 1287), gives 11 September 1287 as a Thursday. This inquisition and the next four of his Norfolk inquisitions all give the same death date and all detail that Petronilla and Maud his daughters were his heirs and both of full age.) He left two daughters, Petronilla, wife of William de Nerford, and Maud, wife of William de Ros, 1st Baron de Ros who were John's heirs.

== Family ==
Vaux married Sibyl and had two daughters who survived him:

- Petronilla de Vaux born c. 1259 married William de Nerford, and had issue. Their daughter Maud de Nerford was the mother of Sir Edward de Warren. Petronilla died in 1326 and was buried at Pentney Priory, which was founded by her paternal ancestor Sir Robert de Vaux or Vallibus.
- Maud de Vaux born c. 1261 married William de Ros, 1st Baron de Ros, had issue.
