= Thomas of Galloway (bastard) =

Scottish rebel against Alexander II

- Lord of Galloway
- Reign: 1235
- Predecessor: Alan of Galloway
- Born: 1208
- Died: Aft 1296
- Spouse: Daughter of Rǫgnvaldr Guðrøðarson
- Issue: Cane McGillolane
- Father: Alan of Galloway

Tomás mac Ailein, sometimes known as Thomas of Galloway (1208 – after 1296), was an illegitimate son of Alan of Galloway, Constable of Scotland and the last Mac Fearghusa Lord of Galloway. After the death of his father, who left no legitimate sons, King Alexander II of Scotland planned to divide the lordship between the husbands of Alan's three daughters.

Thomas, along with his associate Gille Ruadh, led an unsuccessful rebellion against the king, with the aim of maintaining Galloway's status as an independent sub-kingdom. Thomas was imprisoned for the next 60 years and released by Edward I after the Battle of Dunbar in 1296 and the death of Alexander III in 1286, though he was taken back into custody later that year.

Thomas married a daughter of Ronald, King of Man about a decade prior to the death of his father. Thomas had a son, Cane McGillolane, who was the eponymous ancestor of Clan MacLellan.

== Sources ==
- Michael Brown: The wars of Scotland, 1214–1371. Edinburgh University Press, Edinburgh 2004, ISBN 0748612378
- Archibald A. M. Duncan: Scotland. The Making of the Kingdom (The Edinburgh History of Scotland; Vol. I). Oliver & Boyd, Edinburgh 1975, ISBN 0050020374
- Geoffrey W. S. Barrow: Robert Bruce and the Community of the Realm of Scotland. Eyre & Spottiswoode, London 1965
- Michael Penman: Robert the Bruce. King of the Scots. Yale University Press, New Haven 2014, ISBN 9780300148725
