= Llywelyn ap Dafydd =

Prince of Gwynedd

Llywelyn ap Dafydd (c.1267–1287), potential claimant to the title Prince of Gwynedd, was the eldest son of Dafydd ap Gruffydd, the last free ruler of Gwynedd, and his wife Elizabeth Ferrers.

Nothing is known of his early life, though it is thought he was probably born some time around 1267. It is likely he accompanied his father during periods of exile in England in the 1270s. Following the death of Llywelyn ap Gruffudd on 11 December 1282 the governance of Gwynedd was placed in the hands of Llywelyn's successor, his brother, Dafydd ap Gruffudd. Dafydd and his son Owain were captured together at Nanhysglain near to Bera Mawr in the uplands above Abergwyngregyn on 21 June 1283.

King Edward I of England then issued orders for the apprehension of the primogeniture of Dafydd ap Gruffudd. On 29 June, Llywelyn ap Dafydd was arrested and taken to Rhuddlan to be imprisoned alongside his brother. A force of cavalry and infantry were deployed to escort Llywelyn and Owain out of Gwynedd via Acton Burnell in Shropshire to Bristol before the end of July 1283. After his father was executed for high treason in October 1283, he became the de jure Prince of Gwynedd.

The only senior members of the Welsh royal family who retained their liberty were Llywelyn ap Dafydd's uncle Rhodri ap Gruffudd and cousin Thomas ap Rhodri, who had formally renounced their rights to the Principality.

Llywelyn ap Dafydd died at Bristol Castle in 1287 and was buried in the nearby Dominican church (now known as Quakers Friars). His burial was paid for by King Edward I. His brother Owain would "succeed" him but would remain a prisoner until the end of his life.
