= Gille Ruadh =

13th-century leader of Galwegian revolt

Gille Ruadh (Note: Also called Gilla Ruadh, Gilleroth, Gilrod, and Gilroy.) was the Galwegian leader who led the revolt against King Alexander II of Scotland. His birth, death date and origins are all unknown.

Upon the death of Alan, Lord of Galloway, in 1234, Galloway was left without a legitimate feudal heir. Alexander II had decided to partition the lordship between the Anglo-Norman husbands of Alan's three living daughters, Roger de Quincy (married to Ela), John de Balliol (married to Derborgaill) and William de Forz (married to Cairistiona).

However, Alan had left an illegitimate son, Thomas. In Gaelic succession law, Thomas was a perfectly acceptable heir. Thus the native Galwegians and the Gaelic clergy of the province rose in revolt against the Scottish king.

== Leader of Galloway revolt ==
The revolt of the Galwegians started in 1235, under Gille Ruadh's leadership. Matthew Paris says that Manx and Irish forces got involved too. Thomas received help from his father's father-in-law, Hugh de Lacy the Earl of Ulster, Hugh had his own problems which limited his participation. Thomas also seems to have gained support from Ruaidrí mac Ragnaill and the Uí Domnaill of Tír Conaill.

Alexander soon invaded Galloway. Gille Ruadh ambushed the royal army, almost bringing it to disaster. However the Scottish King was saved by Fearchar, Mormaer of Ross. Gille Ruadh and Thomas escaped to Ireland, Alexander returned north, and Walter Comyn, Earl of Menteith, was left to subdue the province, ravaging the lands and monastic establishments (Glenluce Abbey and Tongland Abbey were both sacked, and their abbots punished).

Soon afterwards, Gille Ruadh returned from Ireland with a new army. The royal forces fled the province. However, for an unknown set of reasons, Gille Ruadh abandoned Thomas and gave himself up on favorable conditions to Patrick II, Earl of Dunbar. Thomas followed suit.

The failure of the revolt ensured the death of the Lordship of Galloway as a united and distinct sub-kingdom of northern Britain.
