= Owain ap Dafydd =

Prince of Gwynedd, Wales

- Born: c. 1275
- Died: c. 1325 (aged around 50); Bristol Castle, Kingdom of England
- House: Aberffraw
- Father: Dafydd ap Gruffudd
- Mother: Elizabeth Ferrers

Owain ap Dafydd (c. 1275 – c. 1325), potential claimant to the title Prince of Gwynedd, was the younger son of Dafydd ap Gruffudd, the last free ruler of Gwynedd and the self-proclaimed Prince of Wales. Nothing is known of his early life, though it is thought he likely accompanied his father during exile in England in the 1270s. His mother was Elizabeth Ferrers.

After the death of his uncle Llywelyn ap Gruffudd in late 1282, the governance of Gwynedd was assumed by his father Dafydd ap Gruffudd. After a brief struggle, he and his father were captured together, close to Bera Mawr, above Bethesda on 21 or 22 June 1283. Shortly after this, Dafydd was brought to Shrewsbury where he was executed for treason in October.

Following the arrest of his elder brother Llywelyn on 29 June, they were both escorted under guard out of Gwynedd via Acton Burnell to Bristol Castle. Llywelyn died in 1287, while Owain was last reported to be alive in 1325 when he would have been in his fifties. During much of his captivity at Bristol – and it must be assumed he received the same treatment, or worse, as his brother – he was kept in a cage at night to ensure there was no means of escape. An order from King Edward I of England to the Constable of Bristol Castle, dated October 1305, states:

As the King wills that Owain son of Dafydd ap Gruffudd, who is in the Constable’s custody in the castle, should be kept more securely than he has been previously, he orders the Constable to cause a strong house within the castle to be repaired as soon as possible, and to make a wooden cage bound with iron in that house in which Owain might be enclosed at night.

The exact date and circumstances of his death are not known.
