= William Ferrers, 1st Baron Ferrers of Groby =

Baron in 13-14th century England

Arms of Ferrers, Baron Ferrers of Groby: Gules, seven mascles or conjoined 3:3:1. These are the arms of his paternal grandmother's de Quincy family, adopted in lieu of his paternal arms (Vairy or and gules) by William Ferrers, 1st Baron Ferrers of Groby.

William Ferrers, 1st Baron Ferrers of Groby (31 January 1272 – 20 Mar 1325) was an English peer who lived under two kings, Edward I and Edward II. His baronial caput was Groby in Leicestershire.

== Origins ==
He was born in 1272 at Yoxall in Staffordshire, the son and heir of William de Ferrers (1240-1287), of Groby in Leicestershire (a significant figure in the Second Barons' War between King Henry III and Simon de Montfort, Earl of Leicester), the younger son of William de Ferrers, 5th Earl of Derby, by his second wife Margaret de Quincy, daughter and heiress of Roger de Quincy, 2nd Earl of Winchester (c.1195-1264). His mother was Anne Durward, a daughter of Alan Durward and Margery of Scotland.

== Career ==
Being a minor aged 15 at his father's death, he became a ward of Nicholas Seagrave until 1293, when he recovered livery of his estates. By 1295, Ferrers was abroad on royal service, and acting as Edward I's agent at the Duke of Brabant's court in Hainault. Although he was short of money at the time (having had to mortgage the Newbottle manor for £200), this did not prevent him taking part in the King's military campaign. Other royal service included on the Scottish Marches under both King Edwards in their various campaigns there. In 1296, under the King's instruction, the Keeper of Scotland, John de Warenne restored Ferrers to his Scottish estates that the King still held. He fought at the Battle of Falkirk on 22 July 1298 and at the Siege of Caerlaverock two years later. Following the siege, the Keeper of Galloway also by order of King Edward, restored to Ferrers those estates in that region that the King had still held. In 1301 William Ferrers was signatory to the (eventually unsent) Barons' Letter of 1301 to Pope Boniface VIII, in which Ferrers and 95 other English barons and five English earls repudiated the Pope's claim to overlordship of the Kingdom of Scotland and defended the aggressive policy of King Edward I.

The barony was created by writ on 29 December 1299, and William was summoned to parliament. Financial problems in the early fourteenth-century led him into conflict with his cousin John Ferrers which centred over a disputed claim to the Newbottle manor. The feud was periodically suspended when both parties fought alongside the King in Scotland, specifically when William was there again in 1303, 1306, 1308, and 1311. In 1317 Edward II appointed him Constable of Somerton Castle in Lincolnshire. His final summons to military service was on 1 May 1325.

He was buried in the St Philip and St James Church, Hinckley and Bosworth Borough, Leicestershire.

== Marriage ==
William Ferrers married Ellen de Menteith, daughter of Alexander, Earl of Menteith. They had his heir, Henry, four younger sons, and a daughter.

Peerage of England
New creation	Baron Ferrers of Groby; 1299–1325	Succeeded by Henry Ferrers
