= Sixhills =

Village in Lincolnshire, England

Coordinates: 53.366604°N 0.241632°W

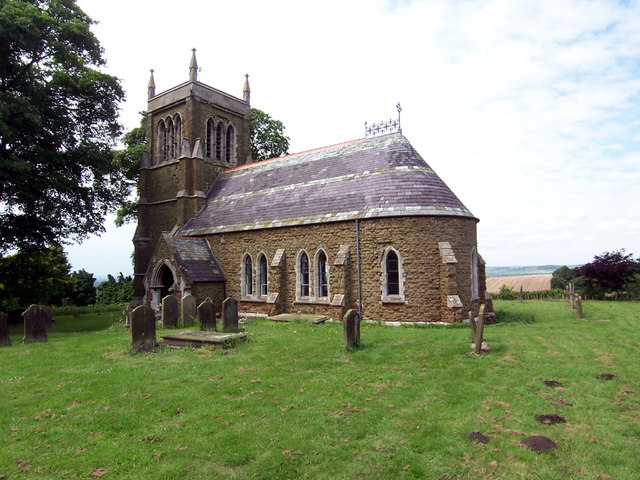
- Church of All Saints, Sixhills

- Location within Lincolnshire
- OS grid reference: TF170869
  - London: 135 mi (217 km) S
- District: West Lindsey
- Shire county: Lincolnshire
- Region: East Midlands
- Country: England
- Sovereign state: United Kingdom
- Post town: Market Rasen
- Postcode district: LN8
- Police: Lincolnshire
- Fire: Lincolnshire
- Ambulance: East Midlands
- UK Parliament: Gainsborough

Sixhills is a village in the West Lindsey district of Lincolnshire, England, about 3 miles (4.8 km) south-east from Market Rasen. It lies just south of the A631 between Market Rasen and Ludford. It is in the civil parish of North Willingham.

The Church of All Saints was designed by James Fowler (1869 and 1875).

== Gilbertine nunnery ==
The village was the site of a former nunnery of the Gilbertine Order, founded in the 12th century. At the behest of Edward I, Gwladys ferch Dafydd was sent there where she remained until her death in 1336. A Scottish princess, Christina Bruce, was also imprisoned there from 1306 to 1315.
