= Roger de Leybourne =

English soldier, landowner and royal servant (1215–1271)

Sir Roger de Leybourne
- Arms of Leyburn: Azure, six lions rampant argent
- Born: 1215
- Died: 1271 (aged 55–56)
- Father: Sir Roger de Leybourne
- Mother: Eleanor of Thornham

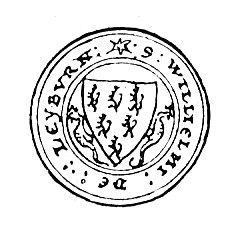
Seal of William de Leyburn, son of Roger, appended to the Barons' Letter, 1301

Sir Roger de Leybourne or Roger Leyburn (1215–1271) was an English soldier, landowner and royal servant during the Second Barons' War.

== Origins ==
Roger was the younger son of another Sir Roger de Leybourne, by his first wife, Eleanor, the daughter and heiress of Stephen of Thornham. In 1199, when the elder Roger was still a minor, his wardship was sold to Thornham for 300 marks. The elder Roger then joined the rebels at the start of the First Barons' War in 1215, being captured in November at the siege of Rochester Castle, paying 250 marks for his release. After the death of the elder Roger some time before 1251 his son William de Leybourne inherited seven Knight's fees in Kent and Oxfordshire, as well as substantial debts, which were only cancelled in 1253 by Henry III.

== Life ==
Roger first came to royal notice in 1252 when he killed Arnulf de Munteny, one of the king's household knights, in a jousting tournament with a sharpened lance, avenging himself of an injury caused by Arnulf in a previous tournament. To atone for his crime he "took the cross" (went on an armed pilgrimage), and was pardoned by King Henry III.

In 1253 he was given the lands of Roger Connell in Kent, and from then until his death he spent large amounts of time and money acquiring land in that county. In 1257 he served in the army of Lord Edward as part of his campaign in Wales, and became part of an influential group of his supporters. He joined Edward in autumn 1259 when he allied with Simon de Montfort, and was made custodian of Bristol Castle in November. He was part of Edward's retinue in 1260 when he and the Earl of Gloucester attempted to take London, and was one of those pardoned when Edward patched up his relationship with Henry III. In thanks for this service Edward gave him the manor of Elham in Kent, but in 1262 the grant was deemed to be in violation of the conditions of Henry giving the manor to Edward in the first place, and the manor was returned, with the High Sheriff of Kent being ordered to take £1,820 from Leybourne's lands; Leybourne frustrated him by simply removing all the goods from his lands in Kent, Essex and Sussex.

In 1263 he along with other Marcher Lords arrested Peter of Aigueblanche, Bishop of Hereford, and seized Hereford, Gloucester, and Bristol, returning south to assault Windsor Castle. They were joined by Simon de Montfort, beginning the Second Barons' War. They marched into Kent, attacking the Cinque Ports. By August 1263 the Marcher Lords were in negotiations with Edward, having been unnerved by de Montford's plan to ally with the Welsh, and they swore an oath to the king on the 18th. From this point onwards Leybourne was a loyal servant of the king, and swiftly returned to royal favour. In September he was made Steward of the King's Household, Keeper of Kent, Surrey and Sussex, and in December was appointed Lord Warden of the Cinque Ports and made High Sheriff of Kent. In October 1263 he was one of those who sealed the agreement between Henry and Louis IX, and travelled with the king to France at the end of the year.

During the second half of the conflict with de Montfort, Leybourne fought at the Battle of Northampton and as a defender at the siege of Rochester Castle, where he was badly wounded. He fought at the Battle of Lewes with the other marcher lords, who were allowed to go free after their defeat on the condition that they return to stand trial at the next Parliament. When they failed to do so, de Montfort sent a military expedition which failed to defeat them. So they remained a thorn in the side of de Montfort throughout the rest of the war.

In December 1264 he was given a safe conduct to visit the king, and then in May 1265 he spoke with Edward, helping organise his escape from Kenilworth Castle on 28 May. Leybourne subsequently fought at the Battle of Evesham, reportedly saving the king's life, and for the two years of conflict after Evesham served as Edward's principal lieutenant. In August 1265 he was made keeper of Westmorland, in October he was given custody of Carlisle Castle, made High Sheriff of Cumberland and trusted with subduing London on behalf of the king. In November he fought the rebels in Kent, and in January 1266 he recaptured Sandwich, serving as Edward's deputy for the capture of the other Cinque Ports. Along with Edward he besieged and captured Winchelsea, fighting off rebels across the Thames in May. He was knighted in September, with the king ordering that he should be received everywhere 'with due honour as the king's knight'. He was also a member of the king's council, and appointed custodian of Nottingham Castle.

During this period he was rewarded by the king with large amounts of land, including the village of Leeds, Kent, where he later built a castle, and areas of Kent, Cumberland and Westmorland. He went on a second pilgrimage in 1269, and was rewarded with 1000 marks from Ottobuono, the papal legate, who later became Pope Adrian V. Rather than going to the Holy Land he travelled to Gascony, where he had been appointed Lieutenant on 29 November 1269, with his aim possibly being to raise men for the crusade. He stayed for long enough to have the city of Libourne named after him, but returned home in December 1270, dying before 7 November 1271.

== Marriages and descendants ==
The name of Roger's first wife is unknown. She was the mother of his two sons, William and Roger. Between 1264 and 1267, he married Eleanor de Vaux, dowager countess of Winchester, a match possibly arranged by the king as a reward for his services. They had no children and she survived him. Roger's heir was his eldest son, William, whose heir at his death in 1310 was his granddaughter, Juliana Leybourne.

Political offices
Honorary titles
Preceded by Unknown	High Sheriff of Kent; 1263	Succeeded by Unknown
Preceded by Unknown	High Sheriff of Cumberland; 1265	Succeeded by Unknown
Preceded by John de Haia	Lord Warden of the Cinque Ports; 1264	Succeeded by Henry de Montfort
Preceded by Unknown	Lieutenant of Gascony; 1264	Succeeded by Unknown
