= Helen of Galloway =

13th-century Scottish person

Helen of Galloway (fl. thirteenth century) was a daughter and co-heiress of Alan, Lord of Galloway (died 1234) and his first wife, a daughter of Roger de Lacy, Constable of Chester. Helen was the first wife of Roger de Quincy, Earl of Winchester (died 1264). Although Helen was the first of Roger's three wives, his only descendants were his three daughters by Helen. The eldest daughter, Margaret (or Margery), married William de Ferrers, Earl of Derby (died 1254); the second daughter, Elizabeth (or Isabel or Isabella), married Alexander Comyn, Earl of Buchan (died 1289); the third daughter, Helen, married Alan de la Zouche (died 1270).

Sources differ as to where exactly she was born, with likely locations being either Carrick in Ayrshire or in nearby Wigtownshire.

== Ancestors ==
Ancestry of Helen of Galloway

8. Uhtred of Galloway
4. Lochlann of Galloway (d. 1200)
9. Gunhilda of Dunbar
2. Alan, Lord of Galloway (d. 1234)
10. Richard de Morville
5. Elena de Moreville
11. Avice de Lancaster
1. Helen of Galloway
12. John fitz Richard
6. Roger de Lacy (1170–1211)
13. Alice de Essex
3. A daughter of Roger de Lacy (1170–1211)
7. Maud de Clere
