= William de Ferrers, 5th Earl of Derby =

English nobleman

The Right Honourable William de Ferrers
- Earl of Derby
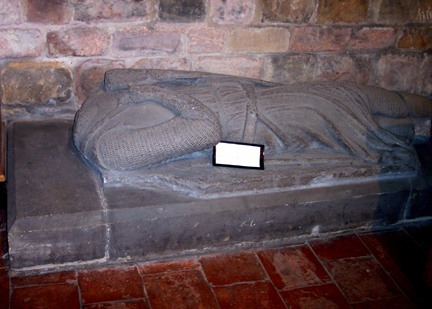
- Effigy of William de Ferrers, 5th Earl of Derby in Merevale Abbey, Warwickshire

- Coat of arms
- Tenure: 1247–1254
- Predecessor: William de Ferrers, 4th Earl of Derby
- Successor: Robert de Ferrers, 6th Earl of Derby
- Born: c. 1193
- Died: 28 March 1254 (aged 60–61)
- Buried: Merevale Abbey
- Spouses: Sybil Marshal (before 1238) Margaret de Quincy (m. 1238)
- Issue: By Sybil Marshal: Agnes de Ferrers; Isabel de Ferrers; Maud de Ferrers; Sybil de Ferrers; Joan de Ferrers; Agatha de Ferrers; Eleanor de Ferrers; By Margaret de Quincy: Robert de Ferrers, 6th Earl of Derby; William de Ferrers; Joan de Ferrers; Agnes de Ferrers; Elizabeth de Ferrers
- Father: William de Ferrers, 4th Earl of Derby
- Mother: Agnes de Kevelioc

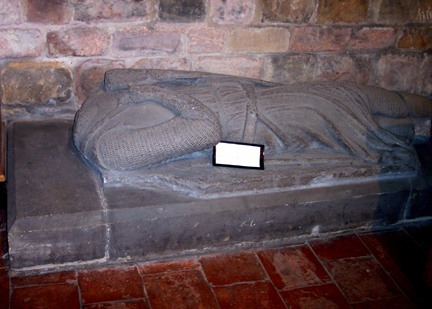
Effigy of William de Ferrers, 5th Earl of Derby in Merevale Abbey, Warwickshire

Arms of William de Ferrers, 5th Earl of Derby: Vairy or and gules, a bordure azure (or sable) charged with eight horseshoes argent

William III de Ferrers, 5th Earl of Derby (c. 1193 – 28 March 1254) of Chartley Castle in Staffordshire, was an English nobleman and major landowner, unable through illness to take much part in national affairs. From his two marriages, he left numerous children who married into noble and royal families of England, France, Scotland and Wales.

== Origins ==
He was the son and heir of William de Ferrers, 4th Earl of Derby (c. 1168 – c. 1247), by his wife Agnes de Kevelioc, a daughter of Hugh de Kevelioc, 5th Earl of Chester (by his wife Bertrada de Montfort).

== Career ==
In 1230 he accompanied King Henry III to France and attended Parliament in London in the same year. Like his father, he suffered from gout from youth and after the 1230s took little part in public affairs, travelling always in a litter. He was accidentally thrown from his litter into the River Great Ouse while crossing a bridge at St Neots in Huntingdonshire and, although he escaped death, never recovered from the effects of the accident. He succeeded to the title of his father in 1247, but only lived another seven years, dying on 28 March 1254.

== Landholdings ==
Unable to play any part at court or at war, he followed his father in managing the family's landholdings. Their original lands were centred on Tutbury Castle, stretching beyond Staffordshire into the south of Derbyshire and the west of Nottinghamshire. The death in 1232 of his uncle Ranulf de Blondeville, 6th Earl of Chester, brought him vast new estates, including Chartley Castle in Staffordshire, much of Lancashire between the Rivers Ribble and Mersey and many manors in Northamptonshire and Lincolnshire. He continued the policy of encouraging the growth of towns and markets, exploiting the forests of Needwood and Duffield Frith, and taking advantage of rising prices in commodities and land values. By the time of his death his income placed him among the top six English nobles, but he also left his son considerable debts.

== Marriages & issue ==
He married twice:

=== To Sybil Marshal ===
He married (1st) Sibyl Marshal, a daughter of William Marshal, 1st Earl of Pembroke, by his wife Isabel de Clare, 4th Countess of Pembroke, by whom he had seven daughters:

- Agnes de Ferrers (d. 11 May 1290), who married (as his second wife) William de Vesci (d.1253);
- Isabel de Ferrers (died before 26 November 1260), who married (1) Gilbert Basset, of Wycombe, and (2) (as his second wife) Reginald II de Mohun, feudal barony of Dunster in Somerset, father-in-law of her sister Joan.
- Maud de Ferrers (died 12 March 1298), who married (1) Simon de Kyme (died 1248), (2) William de Vivonne (died 1259), and (3) Amaury IX, Viscount of Rochechouart.
- Sibyl de Ferrers, who married (as his first wife) Frank de Bohun, of Midhurst, great-nephew of Savaric FitzGeldewin;
- Joan de Ferrers (died 1267) married:
  - (1) Sir John de Mohun, master of Dunster (died 1253 in Gascony), with John de Mohun (1248–79), feudal baron of Dunster as probable issue; and
  - (2) (as his first wife) Sir Robert II Aguillon of Addington;
- Agatha de Ferrers (died May 1306), married Hugh Mortimer, younger son of Ralph de Mortimer;
- Eleanor de Ferrers (died 16 October 1274) married (1) William de Vaux, (2) in about 1252 (as his 3rd wife) Roger de Quincy, 2nd Earl of Winchester, and (3) in about 1265 Roger de Leybourne.

=== To Margaret de Quincy ===
Arms of de Quincy: Gules, seven mascles or conjoined 3:3:1. These arms were adopted by the descendants of William de Ferrers, 5th Earl of Derby and his wife Margaret de Quincy (see Baron Ferrers of Groby), in lieu of their paternal arms of Vairy or and gules

He married (2nd) in 1238 Margaret or Margery de Quincy (c. 1218 - 12 March 1280), daughter and heiress of Roger de Quincy, 2nd Earl of Winchester, by his wife Helen of Galloway. When Margaret's father married (as his 3rd wife) Eleanor de Ferrers (d.1274), she became both step-mother and step-daughter of Eleanor. By Margaret de Quincy he had two sons and three daughters:

- Robert de Ferrers, 6th Earl of Derby (1239–1279), eldest son and heir, who married firstly (aged 10) Mary de Lusignan, a daughter of Hugh XI de Lusignan, Count of Angoulême, and a niece of King Henry III. He married (2nd) in 1269 Eleanor de Bohun, daughter of Sir Humphrey V de Bohun, of Kimbolton Castle, by his wife Eleanor de Braose.
- William de Ferrers (1240–1287), of Groby in Leicestershire, younger son, who having been granted by his mother Groby Castle, founded the junior line of Ferrers of Groby. He married firstly Anne Durward, possibly the widow of Colbán, Earl of Fife and a daughter of Alan Durward, by whom he had issue:
  - William Ferrers, 1st Baron Ferrers of Groby (1272–1325), who assumed the arms of de Quincy (Gules, seven mascles or conjoined 3:3:1) in lieu of his paternal arms;

He married (2nd) Eleanor de Lovaine, a daughter of Matthew de Lovaine, who after her husband's death was abducted by and married to William the Hardy, Lord of Douglas.

- Joan de Ferrers (died 19 March 1309), who married Thomas de Berkeley, 1st Baron Berkeley of Berkeley Castle in Gloucestershire;
- Agnes de Ferrers, who married (1) Sir Robert de Musgrove, of Kemerton, Boddington & Deerhurst (2) John FitzReginald.
- Elizabeth de Ferrers, who married (1) William Marshal, killed at the Battle of Evesham in 1265 (2) Dafydd ap Gruffydd, a prince of Gwynedd.

== Death, burial & succession ==
He died on 28 March 1254 and was buried in Merevale Abbey, Warwickshire. He was succeeded by his 15-year-old eldest son Robert de Ferrers, 6th Earl of Derby (1239–1279), still a minor, who in 1249 aged 10 had been married to Mary de Lusignan, a niece of King Henry III, and knighted. His wardship was granted to the King's eldest son, the future King Edward I. William's first wife's great estates in Ireland (primarily the county of Kildare) passed to her seven daughters and their heirs.

Peerage of England
Preceded by William II de Ferrers	Earl of Derby; 1247–1254	Succeeded by Robert III de Ferrers
