= Groby =

Village in Leicestershire, England

Coordinates: 52.65824°N 1.23267°W

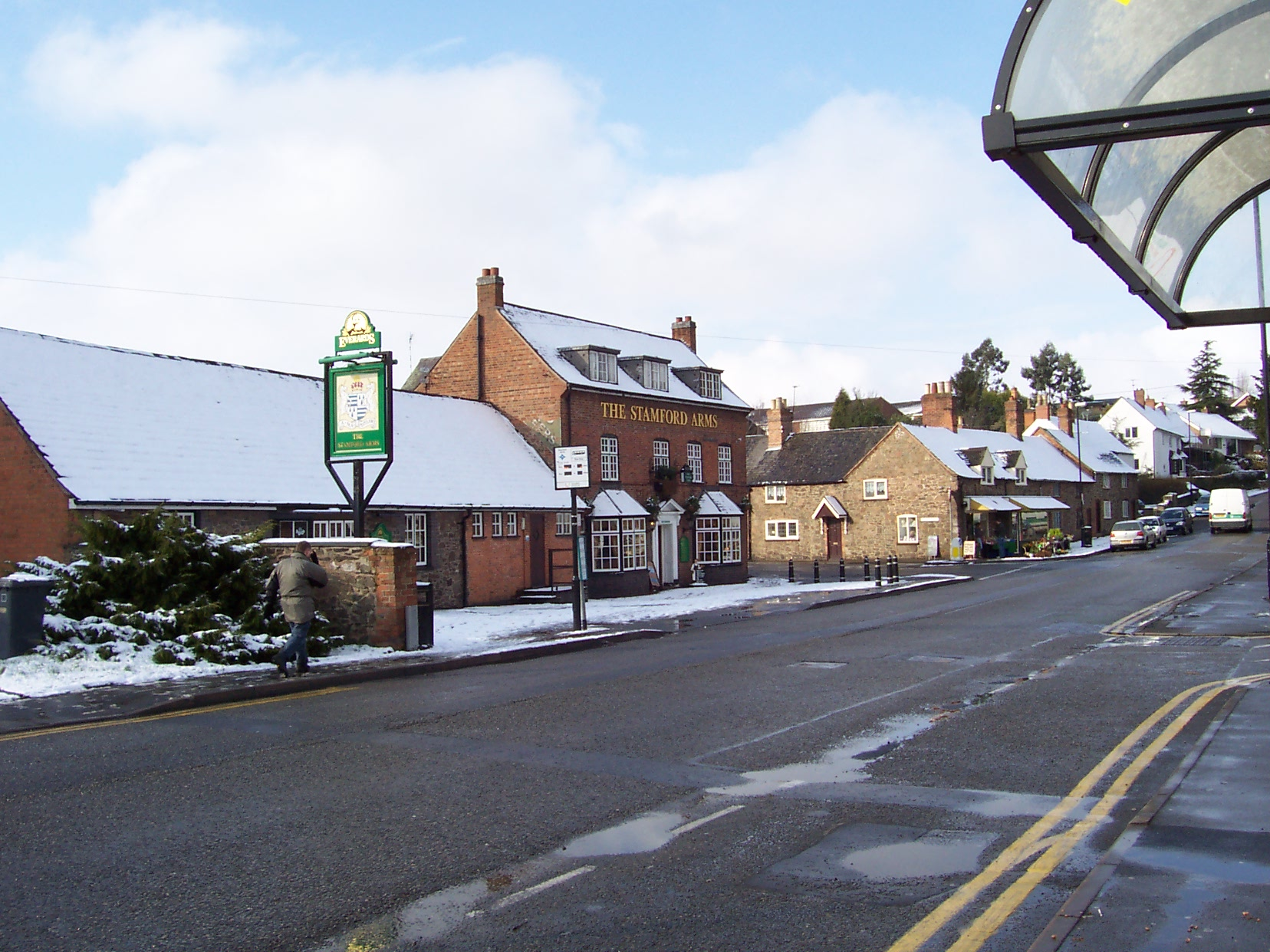
- The village centre in 2005

- Location within Leicestershire
- Population: 6,796
- OS grid reference: SK5207
- Civil parish: Groby
- District: Hinckley and Bosworth
- Shire county: Leicestershire
- Region: East Midlands
- Country: England
- Sovereign state: United Kingdom
- Post town: LEICESTER
- Postcode district: LE6
- Dialling code: 0116
- Police: Leicestershire
- Fire: Leicestershire
- Ambulance: East Midlands
- UK Parliament: Mid Leicestershire

Groby (/ˈɡruːbi/ GROO-bee) is a village in the Hinckley and Bosworth borough of Leicestershire, England. It is to the north west of Leicester. The population at the time of the 2011 census was 6,796.

The village saw a huge expansion during the 1970s along with the village of Glenfield. The historic village centre retains some of its historic buildings, cobbled lanes and thatched cottages. The church of St Philip and St James, built in the lancet style by George Harry Booth-Grey, the sixth Earl of Stamford, dates from 1840 and stands in the grounds of Groby Castle. The architect was William Railton. Additionally the village was also home to the former Groby Old Hall, the stone-built parts of which are thought to have been part of the castle's outer buildings.

== History ==
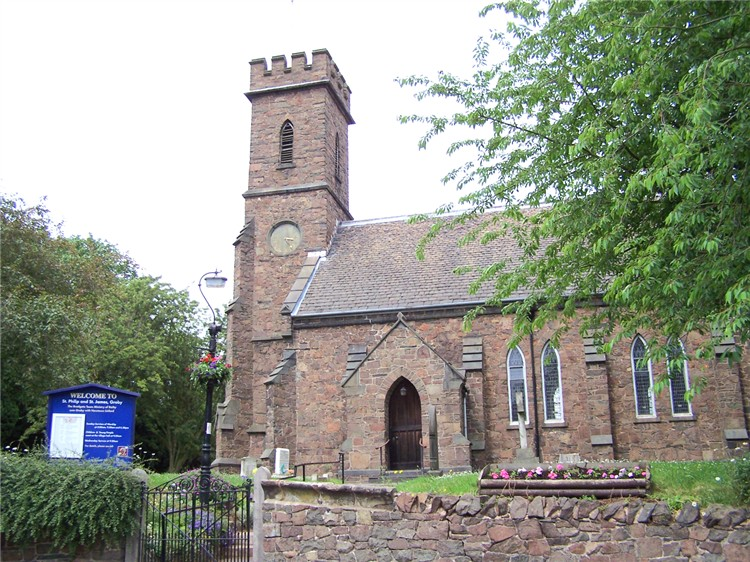
Groby parish church

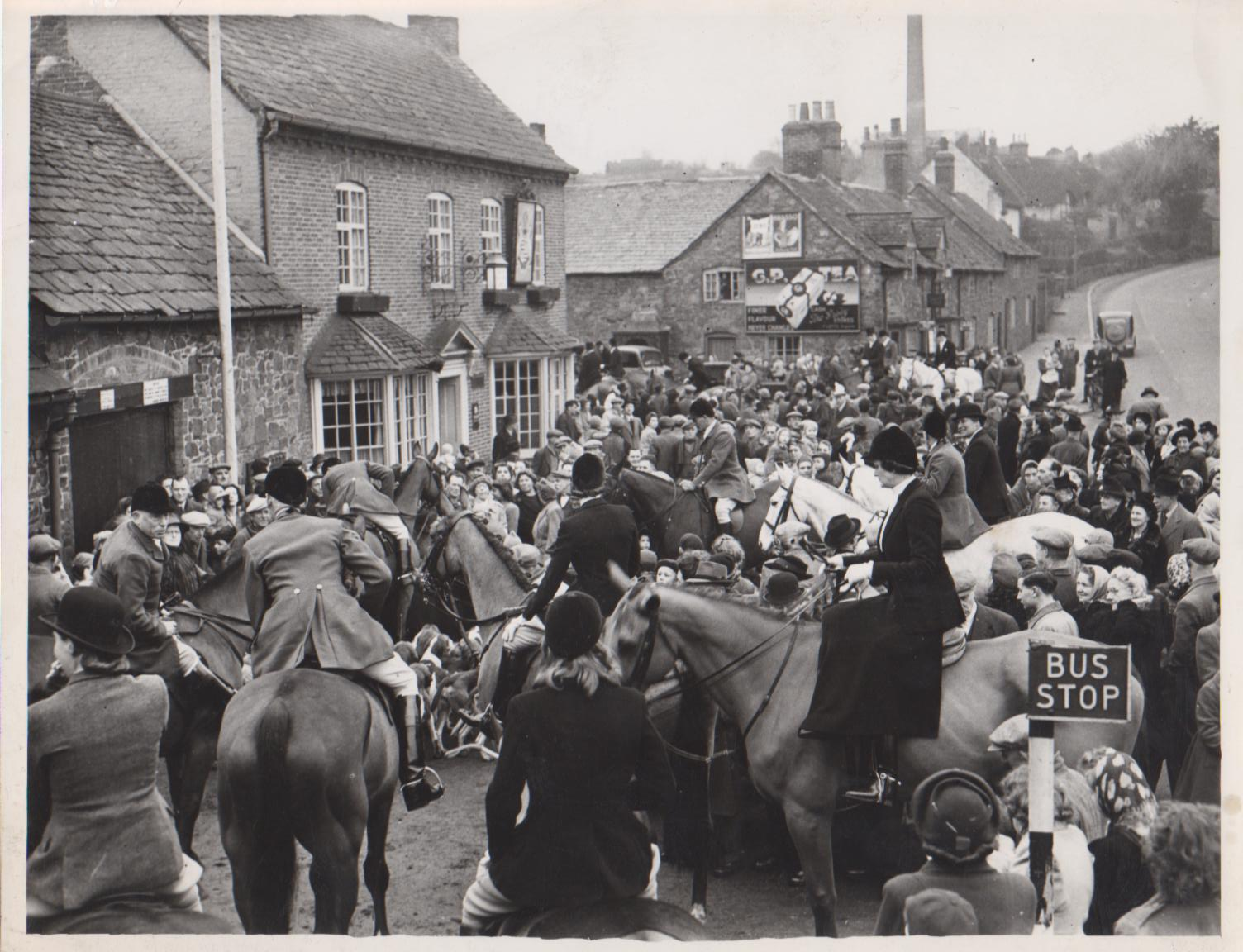
The village centre around 1920, The Stamford Arms, former home of the Everard family became a pub in 1921. According to Groby Heritage Group, the tall chimney belonged to a quarry.

Groby was mentioned in Domesday Book of 1086, when it was described as having "land for 4 ploughs, 10 villagers with 1 Freeman and 5 smallholders have 3 ploughs...the value was 20s; now 60s." Ulf is shown as the lord of Markfield, Groby, Blaby and Ratby in the hundred of Guthlaxton in Leicestershire in 1066. By 1086, the lord was Hugh de Grandmesnil who was also associated with the hundreds of Goscote, Guthlaxton and Gartree in Leicestershire. The estate was held by the Ferrers family until 1445 when it passed to the Grey family. By 1800 the village had expanded with the population reaching 250, and by 1920 it had reached 1,000. Employment in the village was largely in the local granite quarries and in farming. The seventh Earl of Stamford and 3rd Earl of Warrington employed the London architect Mr M.J. Dain of Dain and Parsons to design the Jacobean style mansion to replace the former hunting lodge the Grey family used at Groby when they were hunting in Leicestershire, this mansion was built by the local builder of Groby Mr Thomas Rudkin, Bradgate House was completed in 1856 and built to the north-west of the village and referred to as the Calendar House because it had 365 windows, 52 rooms, and 12 main chimneys. The Earls niece Mrs Katherine Henrietta Venezia Grey sold the Leicestershire estates in 1925, she inherited these in 1905, including Bradgate House, which was demolished (although the ruins of its extravagant stable block remain), from which many villagers bought their homes. Plots of land in the area were subsequently sold to builders, leading to a significant expansion of the village.

Historically, the village is noted for its connection with two Queens of England. Groby Old Hall, built in the 15th century, was owned by the Grey family whose estate included Bradgate Park. Sir John Grey of Groby married Elizabeth Woodville. After his death, in battle, she married Edward IV of England. Bradgate Park was the childhood home of Lady Jane Grey, who became Queen of England for nine days in 1553. The Grey family held the barony until it was forfeited in 1554. Thomas Grey, Lord Grey of Groby became MP for Leicester in 1641 and fought on the side of Parliament in the English Civil War. In 1649 Grey was the only aristocrat of the 59 signatories of the death warrant of Charles I.

There is no definitive explanation of the roots of the village's name, but its '-by' ending implies a link to Viking rule during the period of the Danelaw. Also, groo is a Viking word for pit, which may well refer to the quarry situated next to the village. The Domesday entry lists the village as 'Grobi'. The Concise Oxford Dictionary of English Place-names also shows the names Groubi or Groebi in the 12th century. Furthermore, it suggests the name is from a tarn perhaps with the Old Scandinavian name grōf; and that the Old Norse gróf means "a torrent and a gully formed by it." The dictionary also says, "It is identical with [ Gothic language ] gróba, [ Old High German ] grouba 'pit, hollow'."

== Education ==
There are four schools, Lady Jane Grey Primary, Elizabeth Woodville Primary and Martinshaw County Primary, whilst Brookvale Groby Learning Campus is located on a campus to the west of the village, and attracts students from Groby and surrounding villages including Ratby, Kirby Muxloe, Glenfield, and sometimes Markfield and New Parks. There is also a Scout troop based on the edge of Martinshaw Woods.

== Industry ==
The old quarry in the village centre is now an industrial estate - mostly owned by the company GE Sensing formerly Druck Ltd, which makes pressure transducers.

Groby Quarry is located on the narrow lane which leads through to Newtown Linford, and is still used to quarry granite.

== Groby Pool ==
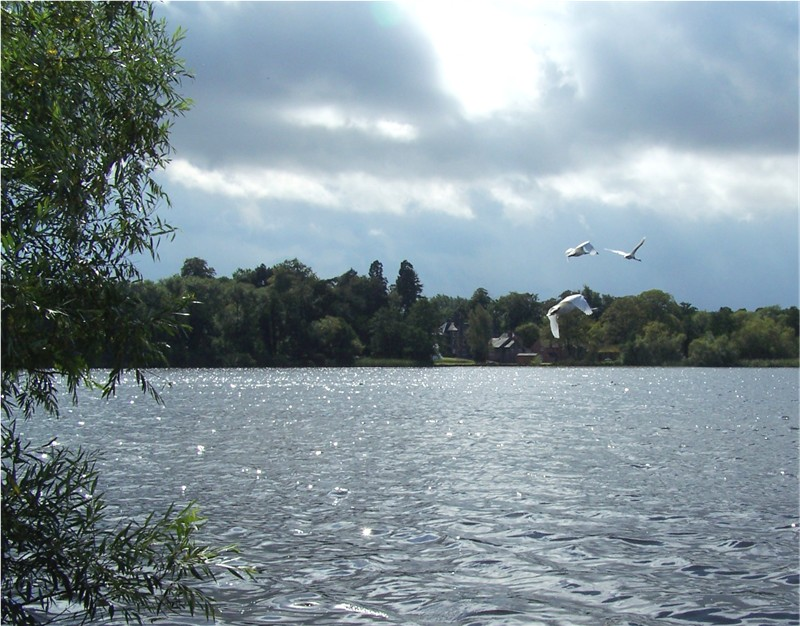
Groby Pool

Groby Pool, "reputedly the largest natural expanse of open water in Leicestershire" is a 38-acre (15-hectare) lake located opposite the quarry on Newtown Linford Lane. It is owned by Hanson quarries and managed by English Nature and became an SSSI in 1956. Due to lack of drainage, "it is one of the most significant wildlife areas in Leicestershire." The origins of the pool are debated. Theories include that it resulted from the damming of Slate Brook by monks from Leicester Abbey or that it was a Roman clay-pit for pottery production. There is a public car park a few minutes' walk to the southeast, and it is possible to walk along the east side nearest the lane, although access elsewhere is restricted. Visitors are requested NOT to feed the birds as it changes the water balance and damages wildlife. The pool has a strict no fishing rule. In 2017, a number of notices were erected around the pool perimeter advising visitors NOT to paddle or swim due to blue green algae.
