= Groby Castle =

Castle in Leicestershire, England

- Groby
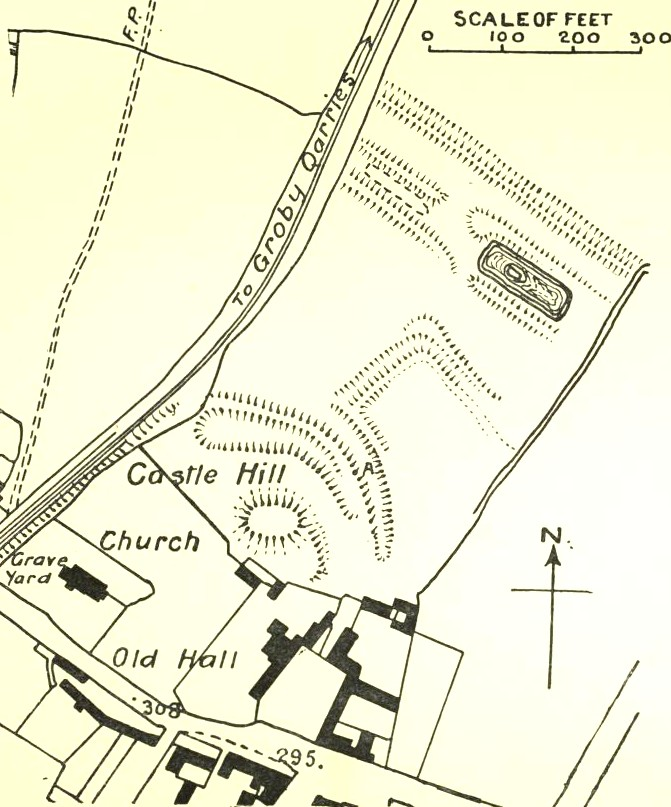
- Plan of Groby Castle (prior to building of the A50 across its northern earthworks)

Location
- Location in Leicestershire
- Coordinates: 52.6640°N 1.2267°W grid reference SK52390764

Groby Castle is situated in the large village of Groby to the north-west of the city of Leicester, England.

== History ==
After the Norman Conquest, the area came into the possession of Hugh de Grandmesnil. Groby was one of 67 manors Grandmesnil held in Leicestershire according to the Domesday Book of 1086. The Victoria County History for Leicestershire suggests that Grandmesnil founded Groby Castle, as does the English Heritage Archive. However, medieval historian R. Allen Brown suggests a foundation date in the third quarter of the 12th century by the Earl of Leicester. This figure was accepted by Professor Leonard Cantor and David Cathcart King. Excavations in the 1960s demonstrated that the motte, an artificial mound, was built around a stone tower.

Along with Leicester, and Brackley, Groby was one of three castles belonging to the earl that were destroyed (slighted) on the orders of Henry II after the Revolt of 1173–1174 led by his son, Prince Henry. According to historian Sidney Painter, it was one of at least 21 castles demolished on Henry II's instructions.

In the 13th century a stone manor house was founded on the site. Antiquarian William Burton noted in the early 17th century that Groby Castle "was utterly ruinated and gone and only the mounts, rampires and trenches were to be seen".

A fragment of one wall remains, together with earthworks consisting of a large mound of earth at the rear of the present manor house known as Groby Old Hall. Part of the site is occupied by the church of St Philip and St James. In 1962 and 1963 excavations were carried out at Groby Castle in preparation for the construction of the A50 road nearby. The road, which runs past the north-east of the motte, destroyed some of the castle's outworks. In April 2010, archaeological television programme Time Team undertook excavations at the castle. Groby Castle is a Scheduled Monument, which means it is a "nationally important" historic building and archaeological site which has been given protection against unauthorised change.

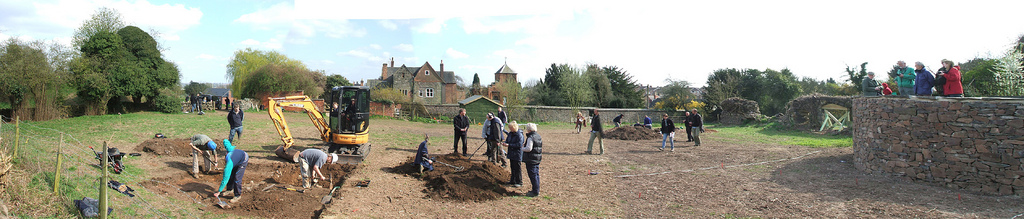
Time Team excavating in Groby in 2010

=== Fictional Groby ===
The ancestral seat associated with the protagonist Christopher Tietjens in Ford Madox Ford's novel Parade's End (published in 1925, and dramatized for television in 2012) is named Groby Hall. The stately home, with an ancient tree growing in the grounds half the height of an even deeper well, is supposedly located in the North Riding of Yorkshire.

"Tietjens was never going to live at Groby. No more feudal atmosphere!"

excerpted from Part VI of the third novel "A Man Could Stand Up"

== See also ==
- Castles in Great Britain and Ireland
- List of castles in England
