= Roger de Quincy, 2nd Earl of Winchester =

Anglo-Norman-Scottish nobleman

Roger de Quincy
- Earl of Winchester; Constable of Scotland
- Arms of Roger de Quincy: Gules, seven mascles or 3,3,1.
- Born: c. 1195
- Died: 25 April 1264 (aged 68–69)
- Buried: Brackley Northamptonshire, England
- Spouses: Helen of Galloway; Maud de Bohun; Eleanor de Ferrers
- Issue: Margaret (or Margery), Countess of Derby; Elizabeth (or Isabel or Isabella), Countess of Buchan; Helen la Zouche
- Father: Saer de Quincy, 1st Earl of Winchester
- Mother: Margaret de Beaumont

Roger de Quincy, 2nd Earl of Winchester (c. 1195 – 25 April 1264), and the hereditary Constable of Scotland, was a nobleman of Anglo-Norman and Scottish descent who was prominent in both England and Scotland, at his death having one of the largest baronial landholdings in the two kingdoms.

== Early life ==
The de Quincy family, originating from the village of Cuinchy in Artois, had been prominent in England and Scotland from about 1130. Roger, second son and eventual heir of Saer de Quincy, 1st Earl of Winchester, and his wife Margaret, younger daughter of Robert de Beaumont, 3rd Earl of Leicester, and wife Petronilla de Grandmesnil. Roger was likely the son that Saer handed over to King John in 1213 as a Scottish hostage to ensure the Anglo-Scottish treaty of 1212. He first became involved in politics in 1215, when he, along with Saer and the leaders of the baronial rebellion against John, was excommunicated by Innocent III. However, he did not play a major role in the civil war that erupted after the king's death. Roger probably joined his father on the Fifth Crusade, during which the elder de Quincy fell sick in Egypt and died. Since Roger's older brother Robert had died a few years earlier, he inherited his father's estates on his return, but was not recognised as earl until his mother died in 1235.

== Career ==
Roger married a major heiress, Helen of Galloway, the eldest of the three daughters of Alan, Lord of Galloway. On her father's death in 1234, he acquired her share of the paternal inheritance, which consisted of the hereditary office of Constable of Scotland and one-third of the lordship of Galloway. The title of Lord of Galloway, however, went through Helen's half-sister Devorguilla to her husband John Balliol.

In 1235 the Galwegians rebelled under Gille Ruadh, not wanting their land divided, but the rebellion was suppressed by King Alexander II of Scotland. The Galwegians revolted again in 1246, following the death without children of Helen's sister Christina, first wife of William de Forz, 4th Earl of Aumale. Further unrest in 1247, possibly due to his strict rule, found de Quincy trapped in a castle, from which he escaped to obtain help from King Alexander in suppressing the rebellion. Although actively managing his lands in Scotland, despite being Constable after this time he seems to have had little further involvement in Scotland's politics and wars.

In England he also steered clear of politics initially but was gradually drawn into the baronial opposition to the rule of King Henry III, He joined with other nobles in 1239 and 1246 in written remonstrances to the Pope about papal interference in English affairs. In 1258, he was elected by the barons to the twelve-member commission charged with overseeing the revised constitution of the Provisions of Oxford and was appointed also to the committee to arrange the financial aid promised to Henry. In 1259 he led a delegation to St Omer that forbade the King's brother Richard, Earl of Cornwall from returning to England unless he swore to observe the Provisions of Oxford. After this de Quincy played little part in national affairs.

He died aged about 69 on 25 April 1264, eighteen days after the outbreak of civil war, and was buried at Brackley. Having no male heir, the earldom of Winchester became extinct and his estates were divided among the husbands of his three daughters.

== Family ==
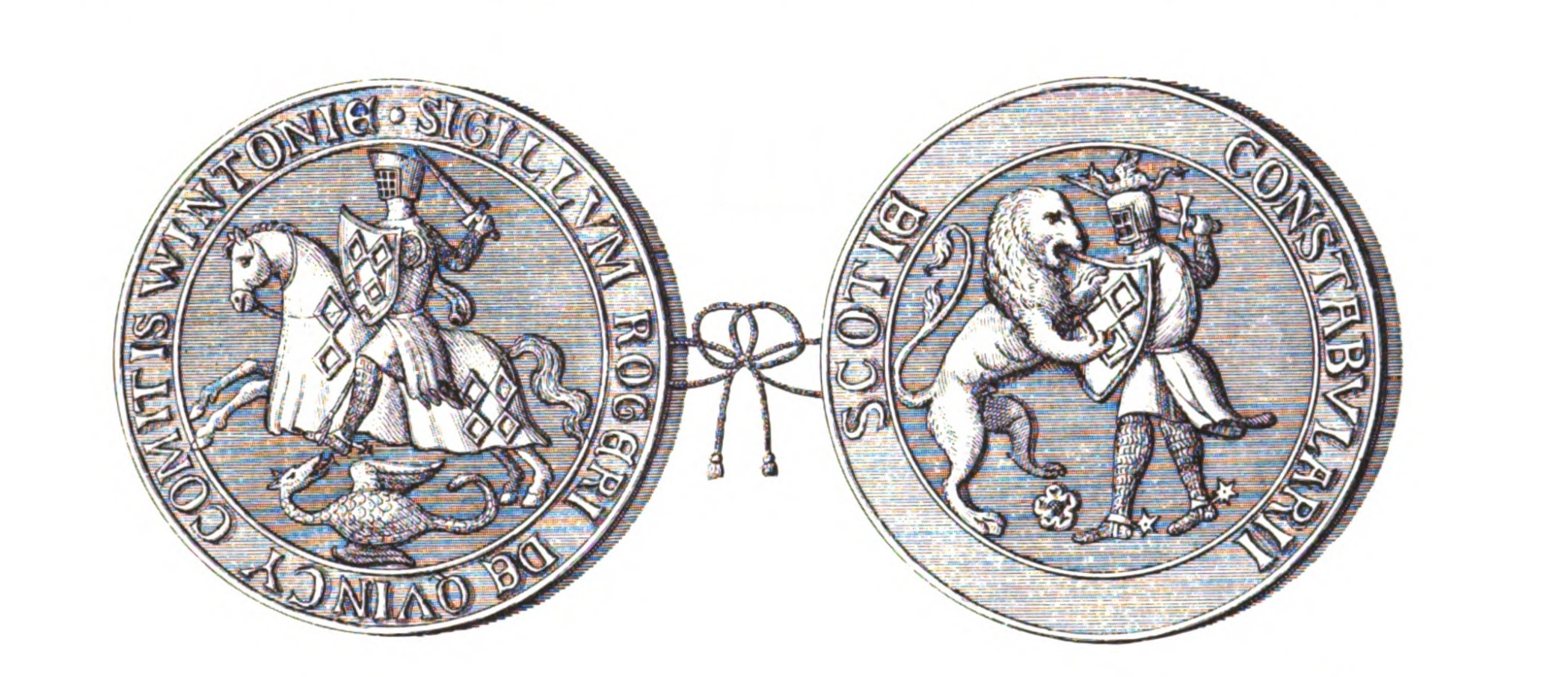
Drawing of Roger de Quincy's seal taken from The History and Antiquities of the County of Leicester

He married three times, leaving three daughters from his first marriage to Helen of Galloway:

- Margaret (or Margery), who married William de Ferrers, 5th Earl of Derby;
- Elizabeth (or Isabel or Isabella), who married Alexander Comyn, 2nd Earl of Buchan;
- Helen, who married Alan de la Zouche.

His second marriage was in about 1250 to Maud de Bohun, daughter of Humphrey de Bohun, 2nd Earl of Hereford, who died in 1252. Thirdly, in 1252, he married Eleanor de Ferrers, daughter of William de Ferrers, 5th Earl of Derby. Neither of these marriages produced any children.

Peerage of England
Preceded by Saer de Quincy	Earl of Winchester; 1219–1264	Extinct
