= Royal Regiment of Wales =

- Active: 1969–2006
- Country: United Kingdom
- Branch: British Army
- Type: Infantry
- Mottos: Gwell angau na Chywilydd "Death rather than Dishonour"
- March: Quick - Men of Harlech; Slow - Scipio
- Anniversaries: St. David's Day, (1 March), Rorke's Drift, (22 January); Gheluvelt, (31 October)

Commanders
- Last Colonel-in-Chief: The Prince of Wales

Insignia
- Tactical Recognition Flash

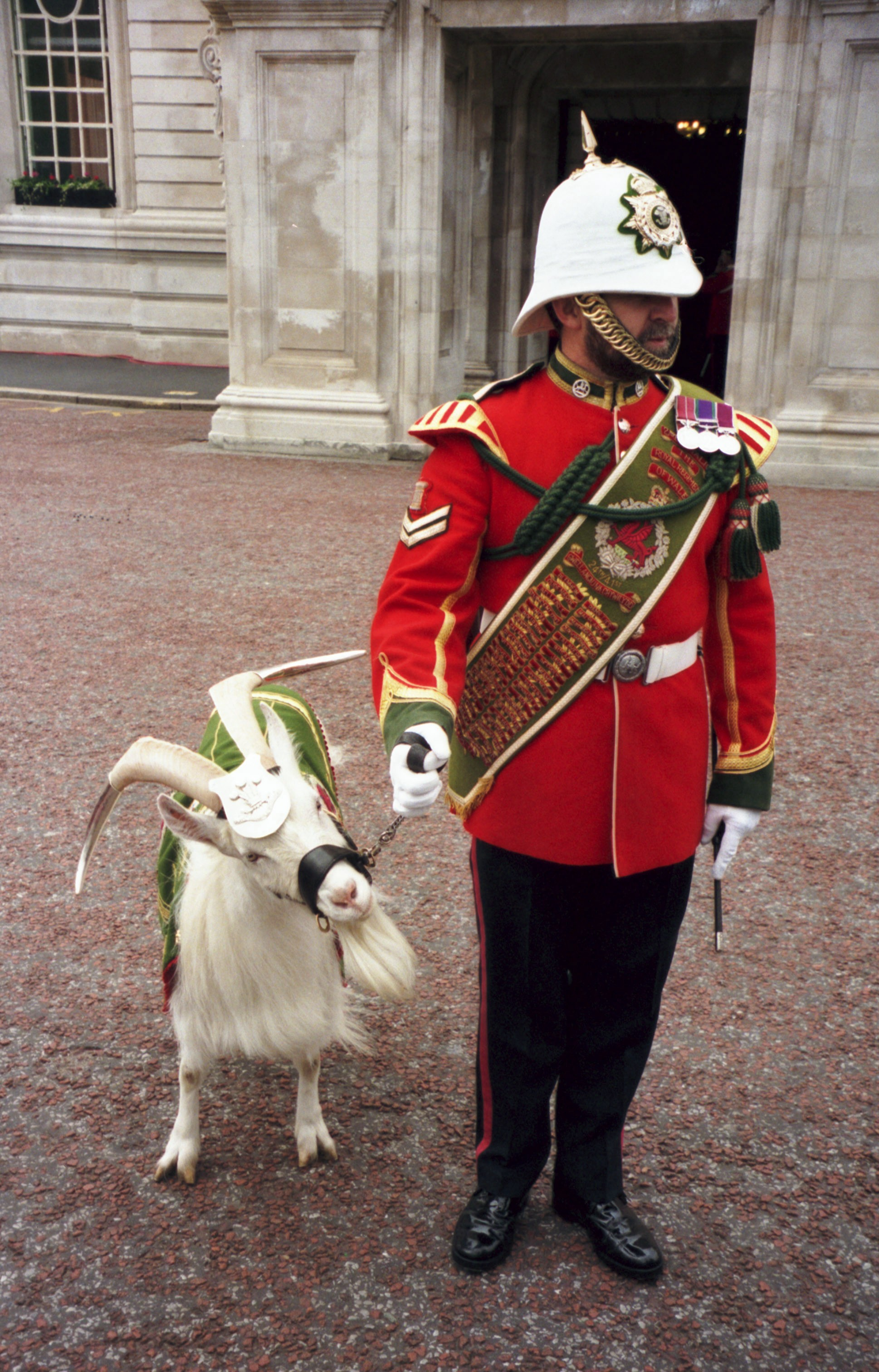
The goat mascot and Goat Major of the Royal Regiment of Wales, 1999.

The Royal Regiment of Wales (24th/41st Foot) was an infantry regiment of the British Army, part of the Prince of Wales' Division. It was formed in 1969 by the amalgamation of the South Wales Borderers and the Welch Regiment. The 1st Battalion, The Royal Regiment of Wales (24th/41st Foot) had a short existence in military terms, just over 36 years. Within two months of amalgamation, the battalion was one of the first units to be deployed to Northern Ireland.

In 2006, the regiment amalgamated with the Royal Welch Fusiliers to form the Royal Welsh.

== History ==
The regiment was formed in 1969 by the amalgamation of the South Wales Borderers and the Welch Regiment. The then Prince Charles (later King Charles III) was appointed Colonel-in-Chief of the new regiment in early 1969, his first Army appointment. The amalgamation parade of the two regiments took place in Cardiff Castle in early 1969, in front of the then Prince Charles.

In August 1969 units of the 1st Battalion the Royal Regiment of Wales became the first British troops to be deployed in Belfast with A & B companies taking control of the Lower Falls Road on the night of 15 August. C company had been deployed some days earlier in Derry.

In 1969 the then Prince Charles went to Caernarfon, North Wales, where Queen Elizabeth II crowned him Prince of Wales. Charles wore the uniform of Colonel-in-Chief of the Royal Regiment of Wales for the ceremony.

From 1969 to 1973 the regiment was posted to Osnabrück in West Germany, returning to Northern Ireland on two occasions for short tours.

The battalion returned to Belfast in 1973 for two years as the resident unit then in 1975 it was posted for two years in West Berlin.

In 1977 the battalion were brought back to the United Kingdom and posted to Aldershot, also during this period they spent time in Belize and Hong Kong as well as on exercise in Germany and a further tour in Northern Ireland. The battalion re-enacted the defence of Rorke's Drift as part of the centenary events at the Cardiff Castle Tattoo in 1979.

Towards the end of 1979, soldiers from the regiment were to play a significant role during Operation Agila, which monitored the fragile ceasefire in Rhodesia (now Zimbabwe) prior to and during the first all-party elections.

In 1982 the regiment was posted to Lemgo in West Germany to begin a six-year tour of duty as a Mechanised Infantry Battalion.

Northern Ireland continued to dominate life in the battalion’s history and during this period. Of particular note was its deployment to Belfast for an emergency tour in May 1981 during which the regiment formed the spearhead for the funeral of hunger-striker Bobby Sands. There were further operational tours in the province of Northern Ireland during 1983-84 and 1986-87.

In 1988 the regiment returned to the United Kingdom to Warminster in Wiltshire as the School of Infantry's Demonstration Battalion and in 1990 the regiment arrived in Hong Kong where it was deployed to the Sino-Hong Kong Border and also carried out anti-smuggling operations with the police.

In 1992 the regiment returned to Britain to be stationed at Clive Barracks in Shropshire and in 1994 the regiment changed roles and began an intense period of Northern Ireland training prior to its deployment to Shackleton Barracks in County Londonderry as a Resident Battalion. The regiment moved to Cavalry Barracks, Hounslow in London in 1996 and then moved to Paderborn (Germany) to take up an Armoured Infantry role, equipped with Warrior armoured fighting vehicles, in 1st (UK) Armoured Division, part of NATO's Allied Rapid Reaction Corps in 1998.

The regiment deployed operationally to Bosnia (Operation PALATINE) in 1999, C coy also deployed to Kosovo (Operation AGRICOLA) 1999 and 2000 and to Iraq (Operation Telic 3) in 2003. It moved to Tidworth in 2005 and units were deployed on Operation Telic 6 later that year.

On 1 March 2006 it was announced that, as part of the reorganisation of the infantry, the Royal Welch Fusiliers and the Royal Regiment of Wales (24th/41st Foot) would amalgamate to form the Royal Welsh. This occurred on 1 March 2006, St David's Day, the national day of Wales.

== Colonel-in-Chief ==
- 1969–2006: Lieutenant General HRH The Prince of Wales KG KT GCB OM AK QSO CD PC ADC

== Colonels of the regiment ==
Colonels of the Regiment were as follows:

- 11 June 1969 - Lieutenant-General Sir David Peel Yates KCB CVO DSO OBE
- 25 September 1977 - Major-General Lionel Alexander Digby Harrod OBE
- 1 January 1983 - Major-General Lennox Alexander Hawkins Napier CB OBE MC DL
- 1 October 1989 - Brigadier Kenneth John Davey CBE MC DL
- 1 October 1994 - Brigadier David de Gonville Bromhead CBE LVO
- 22 October 1999 - Major-General Christopher Haslett Elliott CVO CBE
- 1 November 2004 – 1 March 2006 - Brigadier Robert Hanbury Tenison Aitken
- 2006: Regiment amalgamated with The Royal Welch Fusiliers to form The Royal Welsh

== Regimental goat ==
The Royal Regiment of Wales was one of two British regiments to have a goat as its mascot. The other one was the Royal Welch Fusiliers. The regiment's goats were always named Taffy plus a Roman numeral to show the succession, and are traditionally selected from the royal herd kept at Whipsnade Zoo, an outstation of the London Zoo. It's fitting that the two regiments with goat-mascots have now combined as one. The soldier in charge of the mascot is styled as the "Goat Major", who, unlike what the rank suggests, is a corporal.

Preceded by The Welch Regiment; South Wales Borderers	The Royal Regiment of Wales (24th/41st Foot); 1969- 2006	Succeeded by The Royal Welsh
