= Royal Welsh =

Infantry regiment of the British Army

The Royal Welsh
- Cap badge of the Royal Welsh
- Active: 1 March 2006 – present
- Country: United Kingdom
- Branch: British Army
- Type: Line Infantry
- Role: 1st Battalion – Armoured Infantry; 3rd Battalion – Army Reserve
- Size: Two battalions
- Part of: Union Division
- Garrison/HQ: RHQ – Cardiff; 1st Battalion – Tidworth; 3rd Battalion – Cardiff
- Mottos: "Ich Dien" (German) "I Serve" "Gwell angau na Chywilydd" (Welsh) ("Better Death than Dishonour")
- March: Quick – Men of Harlech; Slow – Forth to the Battle
- Mascot: Persian Goat (Shenkin IV)
- Anniversaries: St David's Day – 1 March
- Engagements: Operation Telic; Operation Herrick

Commanders
- Colonel in Chief: King Charles III
- Colonel of the Regiment: Brigadier Nigel Offley Crewe-Read

Insignia
- Tactical Recognition Flash
- Hackle: White (ORs only); From Royal Welch Fusiliers
- Abbreviation: R WELSH

The Royal Welsh (R WELSH) (Welsh: Y Cymry Brenhinol) is an armoured infantry regiment of the British Army. It was established in 2006 from the Royal Welch Fusiliers (23rd Foot) and the Royal Regiment of Wales (24th/41st Foot).

== History ==
The regiment's formation was announced on 16 December 2004 by Geoff Hoon and General Sir Mike Jackson as part of the restructuring of the infantry and it was actually formed on St David's Day, 1 March 2006. The Royal Welsh initially consisted of two Regular Army battalions, plus an Army Reserve battalion. The former regiments formed part of the battalion title (in brackets):

- 1st Battalion, The Royal Welsh (Royal Welch Fusiliers) (ex 1st Battalion, the Royal Welch Fusiliers (23rd Foot))
- 2nd Battalion, The Royal Welsh (Royal Regiment of Wales) (ex 1st Battalion, the Royal Regiment of Wales (24th/41st Foot))

The 1st battalion deployed to Afghanistan in October 2007, October 2009 and April 2012.

In July 2007 the 2nd battalion deployed to Iraq and between 2009 and 2011 the battalion deployed companies to Afghanistan.

The 2nd battalion merged with 1st battalion to form a single battalion, the 1st Battalion, The Royal Welsh on 2 April 2014.

== Structure ==
The 1st Battalion, The Royal Welsh is a Regular Army armoured infantry battalion based at Tidworth Camp. It comes under 12th Armoured Infantry Brigade with HQ at Bulford Camp in Wiltshire.

The 3rd Battalion, The Royal Welsh is an Army Reserve light infantry battalion based at Maindy Barracks in Cardiff, with company locations in Swansea, Pontypridd, Aberystwyth and Colwyn Bay. Paired with 1st Battalion The Royal Welsh, it also comes under 12th Armoured Infantry Brigade.

== Regimental museum ==
The Regimental Museum of The Royal Welsh is at The Barracks, Brecon. Meanwhile Firing Line: Cardiff Castle Museum of the Welsh Soldier is based at Cardiff Castle

== Traditions ==
The regiment's cap badge is a representation of the Prince of Wales's feathers (formerly the cap badge of the Royal Regiment of Wales), while the hackle of the Royal Welch Fusiliers is worn by all NCOs and Other Ranks. Queen Elizabeth II was the new regiment's Colonel-in-Chief until her death in September 2022.

The regiment includes a goat, presented by the monarch; this is not a mascot but a ranking soldier. Lance Corporal William Windsor retired on 20 May 2009; a replacement, Fusilier William Windsor, was appointed on 15 June 2009.

== Regimental Band and Corps of Drums of The Royal Welsh ==
The Regimental Band of The Royal Welsh is an all-brass band within the British Army. Formed of 30 soldiers who are all members of the Army Reserve, it can provide a marching band, a concert band or a fanfare team.

In October 2009, due to £54m of Ministry of Defence budget cuts affecting front line services including the war in Afghanistan, all bookings from end of October 2009 until April 2010 were cancelled. This covered the Autumn Rugby Union Internationals and Remembrance Day. Band members agreed to honour all charity appearances during this period, but without pay.

== Regimental Colonels ==
Regimental Colonels have been as follows:

- 2006–2011: Major General Roderick J. M. Porter
- 2011–2016: Brigadier Philip M. L. Napier
- 2016–2021: Lieutenant General James Swift, OBE
- 2021–2026: Major General Chris Barry
- 2026–present: Brigadier Nigel Offley Crewe-Read

== Freedoms ==
The regiment has received the Freedom of several locations throughout its history. As of 2019 the regiment has received the freedom of 28 local authorities; these include:

- (Wales) 23 July 2011: Bangor.
- (Wales) 25 September 2010: Blackwood.
- (Wales) 19 February 2011: Blaenau Gwent.
- (Wales) 30 August 2008: Bridgend.
- (Wales) 25 April 2009: Caernarfon.
- (Wales) 26 September 2010: Caerphilly.
- (Wales) 2008: Carmarthenshire.
- (Wales) 25 April 2009: Ceredigion.
- (Wales) 20 September 2010: Conwy.
- (Wales) 13 June 2011: Denbighshire.
- (Wales) 24 April 2009: Flintshire.
- (Wales) 4 March 2011: Monmouthshire.
- 2006: Neath Port Talbot (Originally Granted to the Royal Regiment of Wales in July 1993).
- (Wales) 15 September 2018: Pembroke.
- (Wales) 2010: Rhondda Cynon Taf.
- (Wales) 5 June 2010: Torfaen.
- (Wales) 21 February 2009: Vale of Glamorgan.

== Alliances ==
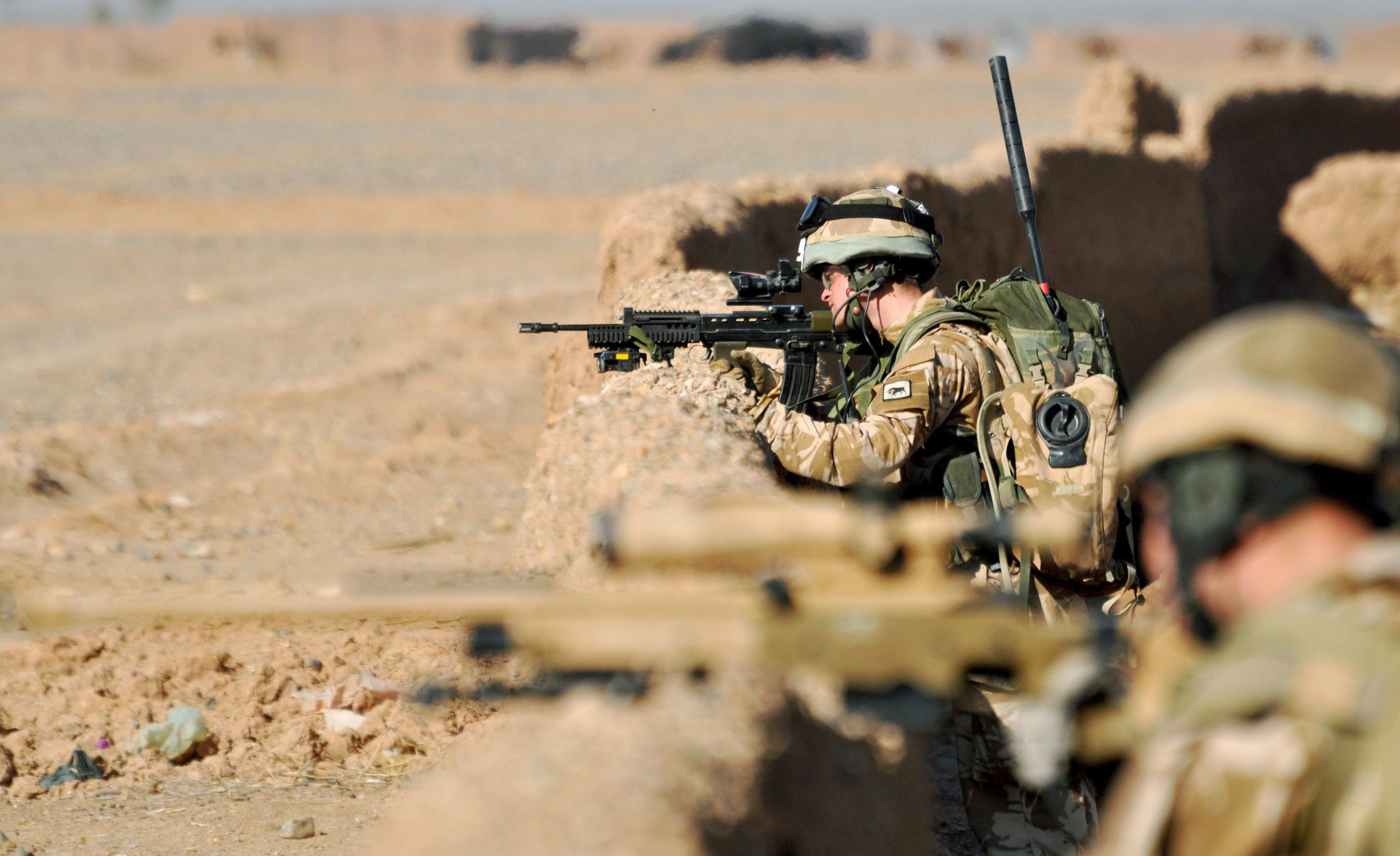
Soldiers from the Mobility Reconnaissance Force of 1 Royal Welsh take up a defensive position north of Patrol Base Wahid, Nad-E' Ali, Helmand during a patrol.

- Canada – Royal 22^{e} Régiment
- Canada – The Ontario Regiment (RCAC)
- Australia – The Royal New South Wales Regiment
- South Africa – 121 South African Infantry Battalion
- South Africa – Pretoria Armour Regiment
- Pakistan – 4th Battalion, The Baloch Regiment
- Pakistan – 3rd Battalion, The Frontier Force Regiment
- Malaysia – 4th Battalion, The Royal Malay Regiment

== Order of precedence ==
| Preceded by Mercian Regiment | Infantry Order of Precedence | Succeeded by The Royal Irish Regiment |

== Lineage ==
| 1880 | 1881 Childers Reforms | 1921 Name changes | 1957 Defence White Paper | 1966 Defence White Paper | 1990 Options for Change | 2006 Delivering Security in a Changing World |
|---|---|---|---|---|---|---|
| 23rd (Royal Welsh Fusiliers) Regiment of Foot | The Royal Welsh Fusiliers | The Royal Welch Fusiliers | | | | The Royal Welsh |
| 24th (2nd Warwickshire) Regiment of Foot | The South Wales Borderers | | | Royal Regiment of Wales (24th/41st Foot) | | The Royal Welsh |
| 41st (The Welsh) Regiment of Foot | The Welsh Regiment | The Welch Regiment | | Royal Regiment of Wales (24th/41st Foot) | | The Royal Welsh |
| 69th (South Lincolnshire) Regiment of Foot | The Welsh Regiment | The Welch Regiment | | Royal Regiment of Wales (24th/41st Foot) | | The Royal Welsh |
