= Firing Line: Cardiff Castle Museum of the Welsh Soldier =

Museum in Cardiff Castle, Wales

Firing Line
- Amgueddfa'r Milwr Cymreig
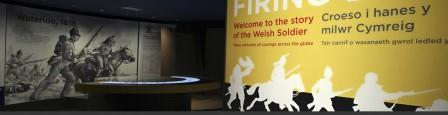
- Entrance of the Firing Line Museum

- Location within Cardiff
- Established: 2010
- Location: Cardiff Castle, Cardiff, Wales
- Coordinates: 51.482°N 3.181°W
- Type: Military
- Website: Museum of the Welsh Soldier

Firing Line: Cardiff Castle Museum of the Welsh Soldier (Welsh: Tanio llinell: Amgueddfa Castell Caerdydd o'r Milwr Cymreig) is an accredited, charitable museum which exhibits the collections of the 1st The Queen's Dragoon Guards and The Royal Welsh. It occupies the lower floor of the interpretation centre at Cardiff Castle.

== History ==
The individual collections of the Queen's Dragoon Guards Museum, which had been based at Bowness-on-Windermere, and of the Welch Regiment Museum, which had been based in the Black and Barbican Towers of Cardiff Castle, were brought together at Cardiff Castle in 2010.

== Collections ==
The museum is dedicated to the history of the 1st The Queen's Dragoon Guards and the Royal Welsh. Its mission is to commemorate and celebrate regimental culture and ethos whilst highlighting the stories of ordinary people who have done extraordinary things in the line of military service.
