= Cardiff Castle =

Grade I listed castle in Cardiff, Wales

- Castle Quarter, Cardiff, Wales
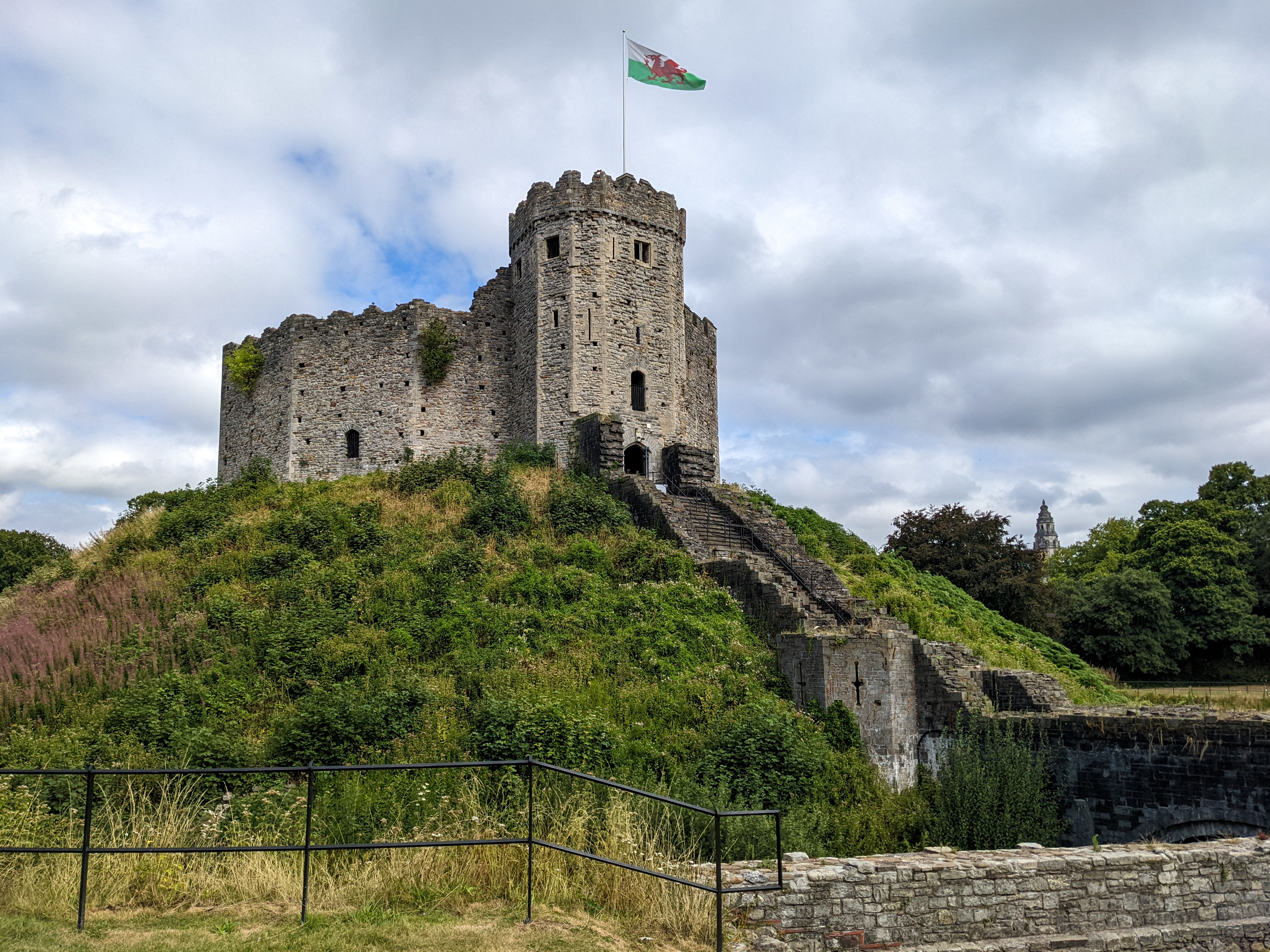
- The keep from the south

- Logo of Cardiff Castle

Site information
- Owner: Cardiff Council
- Open to the public: Yes

Location
- Cardiff Castle shown within Cardiff
- Location within Cardiff
- Coordinates: 51.4823°N 3.1812°W
- Grid reference: grid reference ST179766

Site history
- Built: Late 11th century; current appearance the result of Victorian era renovations
- In use: Tourist attraction
- Events: Norman invasion of Wales; Despenser War; Glyndŵr Rising; English Civil War; Second World War

Scheduled monument
- Official name: Cardiff Castle and Roman Fort
- Reference no.: GM171

Listed Building – Grade I
- Official name: Cardiff Castle
- Designated: 12 February 1952; 74 years ago
- Reference no.: 13662

Cadw/ICOMOS Register of Parks and Gardens of Special Historic Interest in Wales
- Official name: Cardiff Castle and Bute Park
- Designated: 1 February 2022; 4 years ago
- Reference no.: PGW(Gm)22(CDF)
- Listing: Grade I

Cardiff Castle (Welsh: Castell Caerdydd) is a medieval castle and Victorian Gothic mansion located in the city centre of Cardiff, Wales. The original motte and bailey castle was built in the late 11th century by Norman invaders on top of a 3rd-century Roman fort. The castle was commissioned either by William the Conqueror or by Robert Fitzhamon, and formed the heart of the medieval town of Cardiff and the Marcher Lord territory of Glamorgan. In the 12th century the castle began to be rebuilt in stone, probably by Robert of Gloucester, with a shell keep and substantial defensive walls being erected. Further work was conducted by the 6th Earl of Gloucester in the second half of the 13th century. Cardiff Castle was repeatedly involved in the conflicts between the Anglo-Normans and the Welsh, being attacked several times in the 12th century, and stormed in 1404 during the revolt of Owain Glyndŵr.

After being held by the de Clare and Despenser families for several centuries, the castle was acquired by the 13th Earl of Warwick in 1423. Warwick conducted extensive work on the castle, founding the main lodgings on the west side of the castle, dominated by a tall octagonal tower. Following the Wars of the Roses, the status of the castle as a Marcher territory was revoked and its military significance began to decline. The Herbert family took over the property in 1550, remodelling parts of the main lodgings and carrying out construction work in the outer bailey, then occupied by Cardiff's Shire Hall and other buildings. During the English Civil War Cardiff Castle was initially taken by a Parliamentary force, but was regained by Royalist supporters in 1645. When fighting broke out again in 1648, a Royalist army attacked Cardiff in a bid to regain the castle, leading to the Battle of St Fagans just outside the city. Cardiff Castle escaped potential destruction by Parliament after the war and was instead garrisoned, probably to protect against a possible Scottish invasion.

In the mid-18th century, Cardiff Castle passed into the hands of the Scottish Marquesses of Bute. The 1st Marquess of Bute employed Capability Brown and Henry Holland to renovate the main lodgings, turning it into a Georgian mansion, and to landscape the castle grounds, demolishing many of the older medieval buildings and walls. During the first half of the 19th century the family became extremely wealthy as a result of the growth of the coal industry in Glamorgan. However, it was the 3rd Marquess of Bute who truly transformed the castle, using his vast wealth to back an extensive programme of renovations under William Burges. Burges remodelled the castle in a Gothic revival style, lavishing money and attention on the main lodgings. The resulting interior designs are considered to be amongst "the most magnificent that the gothic revival ever achieved". The grounds were re-landscaped and, following the discovery of the old Roman remains, reconstructed walls and a gatehouse in a Roman style were incorporated into the castle design. Extensive landscaped parks were built around the outside of the castle.

In the early 20th century, the 4th Marquess of Bute inherited the castle and construction work continued into the 1920s. The Bute lands and commercial interests around Cardiff were sold off or nationalised until, by the time of the Second World War, little was left except the castle. During the war, extensive air raid shelters were built in the castle walls; they could hold up to 1,800 people. When the 4th Marquess died in 1947, the castle was given to the City of Cardiff. Today the castle is run as a tourist attraction, with the grounds housing the "Firing Line" regimental museum and interpretation centre. The castle also serves as a venue for events, including musical performances and festivals.

== History ==
=== 1st–4th centuries AD ===
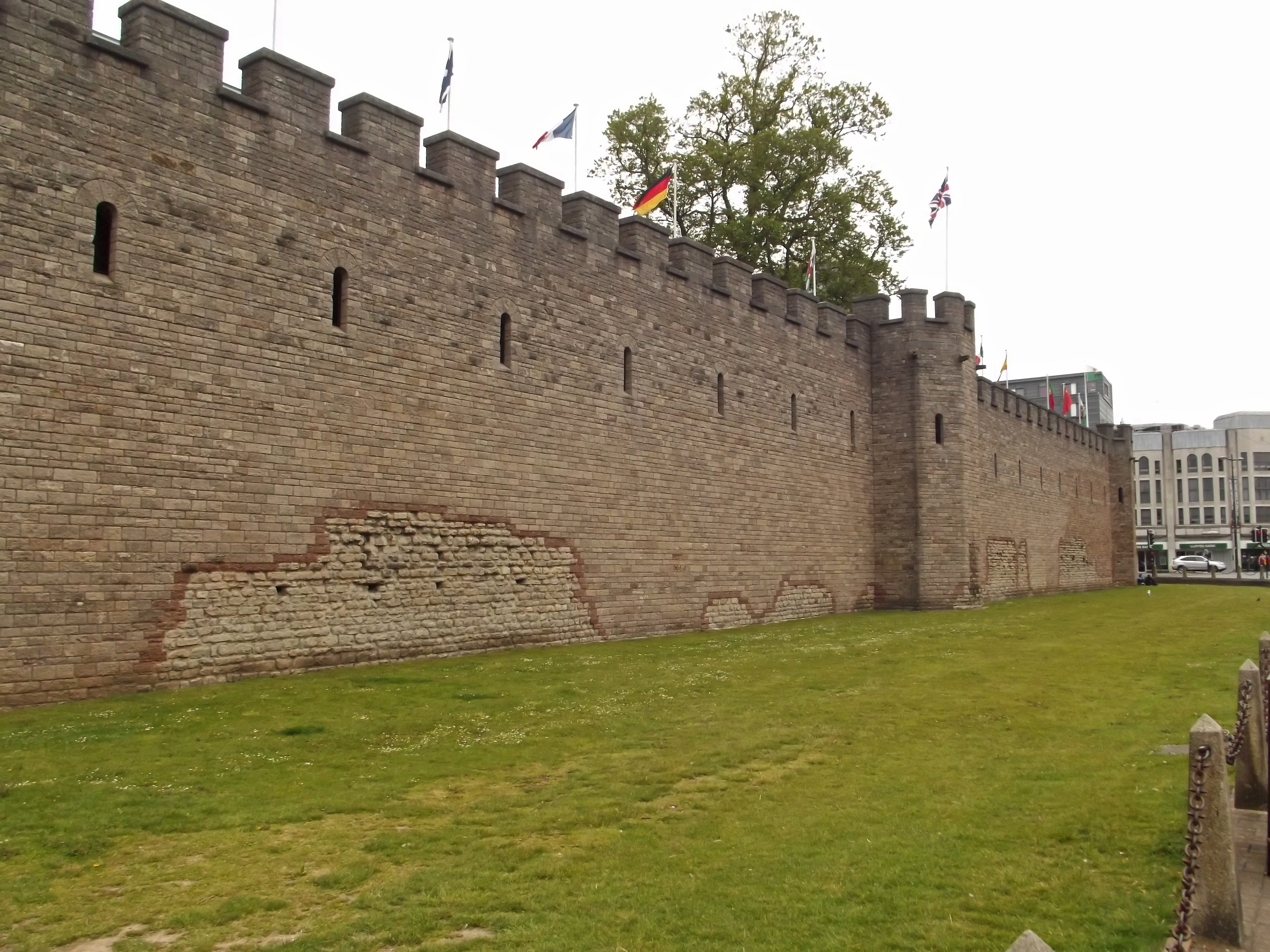
Parts of the original Roman fort beneath the red stones on the southern wall

The future site of Cardiff Castle was first used by the Romans as a defensive location for many years. The first fort was probably built about AD 55 and occupied until AD 80. It was a rectangular structure much larger than the current site, and formed part of the southern Roman border in Wales during the conquest of the Silures. When the border advanced, defences became less important and the fort was replaced with a sequence of two, much smaller, fortifications on the north side of the current site.

A fourth fort was built in the middle of the 3rd century in order to combat the pirate threat along the coast, and forms the basis of the Roman remains seen on the castle site. The fort was almost square in design, approximately 635 feet (194 m) by 603 feet (184 m) large, constructed from limestone brought by sea from Penarth. The fort's irregular shape was determined by the River Taff that flowed along the west side of the walls. The sea would have come much closer to the site than is the case in the 21st century, and the fort would have directly overlooked the harbour. This Roman fort was probably occupied at least until the end of the 4th century, but it is unclear when it was finally abandoned. There is no evidence for the re-occupation of the site until the 11th century.

=== 11th century ===
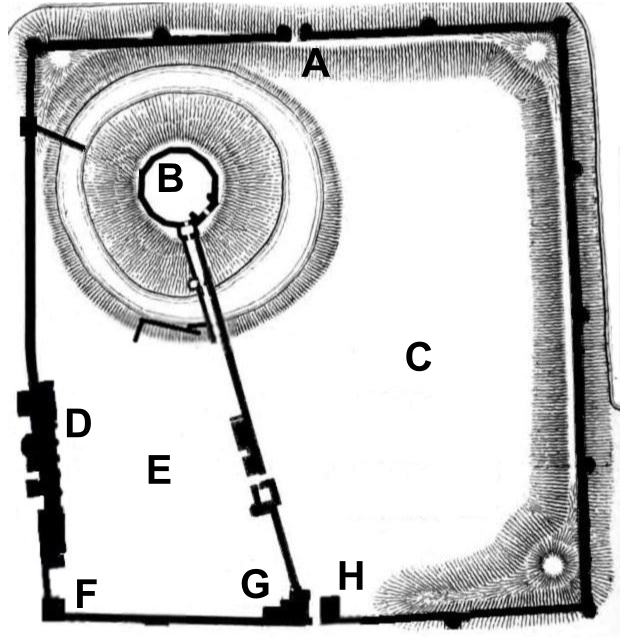
Plan of the castle in the 21st century; A – North Gate; B – motte and shell keep; C – outer bailey; D – main lodgings; E – inner bailey; F – the Clock Tower; G – the Black Tower; H – South Gate and barbican tower

The Normans began to make incursions into South Wales from the late 1060s onwards, pushing westwards from their bases in recently occupied England. Their advance was marked by the construction of castles, frequently on old Roman sites, and the creation of regional lordships. The reuse of Roman sites produced considerable savings in the manpower required to construct large earth fortifications.

Cardiff Castle was built during this period. There are two possible dates for the construction: William the Conqueror may have built a castle at Cardiff as early as 1081 on his return from his armed pilgrimage to St Davids. Alternatively, the first Norman fortification may have been constructed around 1091 by Robert Fitzhamon, the lord of Gloucester. Fitzhamon invaded the region in 1090, and used the castle as a base for the occupation of the rest of southern Glamorgan over the next few years. The site was close to the sea and could be easily supplied by ship, was well protected by the Rivers Taff and Rhymney and also controlled the old Roman road running along the coast.

Cardiff Castle was a motte-and-bailey design. The old Roman walls had collapsed and the Normans used their remains as the basis for the outer castle perimeter, digging a defensive trench and throwing up a 27-foot (8.2 m) high bank of earth over the Roman fortifications. The Normans further divided the castle with an internal wall to form an inner and an outer bailey. In the north-west corner of the castle a wooden keep was constructed on top of a 40-foot (12 m) tall earth motte, surrounded by a 30-foot (9.1 m) wide moat. The motte was the largest built in Wales. The overall area of the castle was around 8.25 acres (3.34 ha); the inner bailey was around 2 acres (0.81 ha) in area. Mills were essential to local communities during this period, and the castle mill was located outside the west side of the castle, fed by the River Taff; under local feudal law, the residents of Cardiff were required to use this mill to grind their own grain.

The conquered lands in Glamorgan were given out in packages called knights' fees, and many of these knights held their lands on condition that they provided forces to protect Cardiff Castle. Under this approach, called a castle-guard system, some knights were required to maintain buildings called "houses" within the castle itself, in the outer bailey. Anglo-Saxon peasants settled the region around Cardiff, bringing with them English customs, although Welsh lords continued to rule the more remote districts almost independently until the 14th century. Cardiff Castle was a Marcher Lord territory, enjoying special privileges and independence from the English Crown. The medieval town of Cardiff spread out from the south side of the castle.

=== 12th–14th centuries ===
The reconstructed Roman wall within the Castle grounds
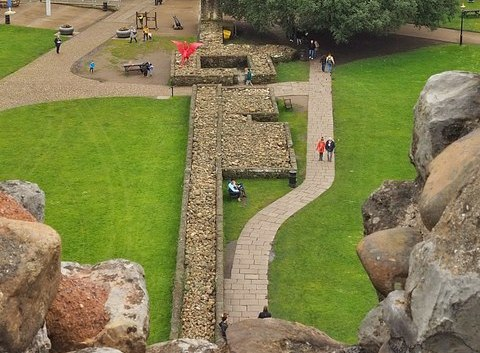
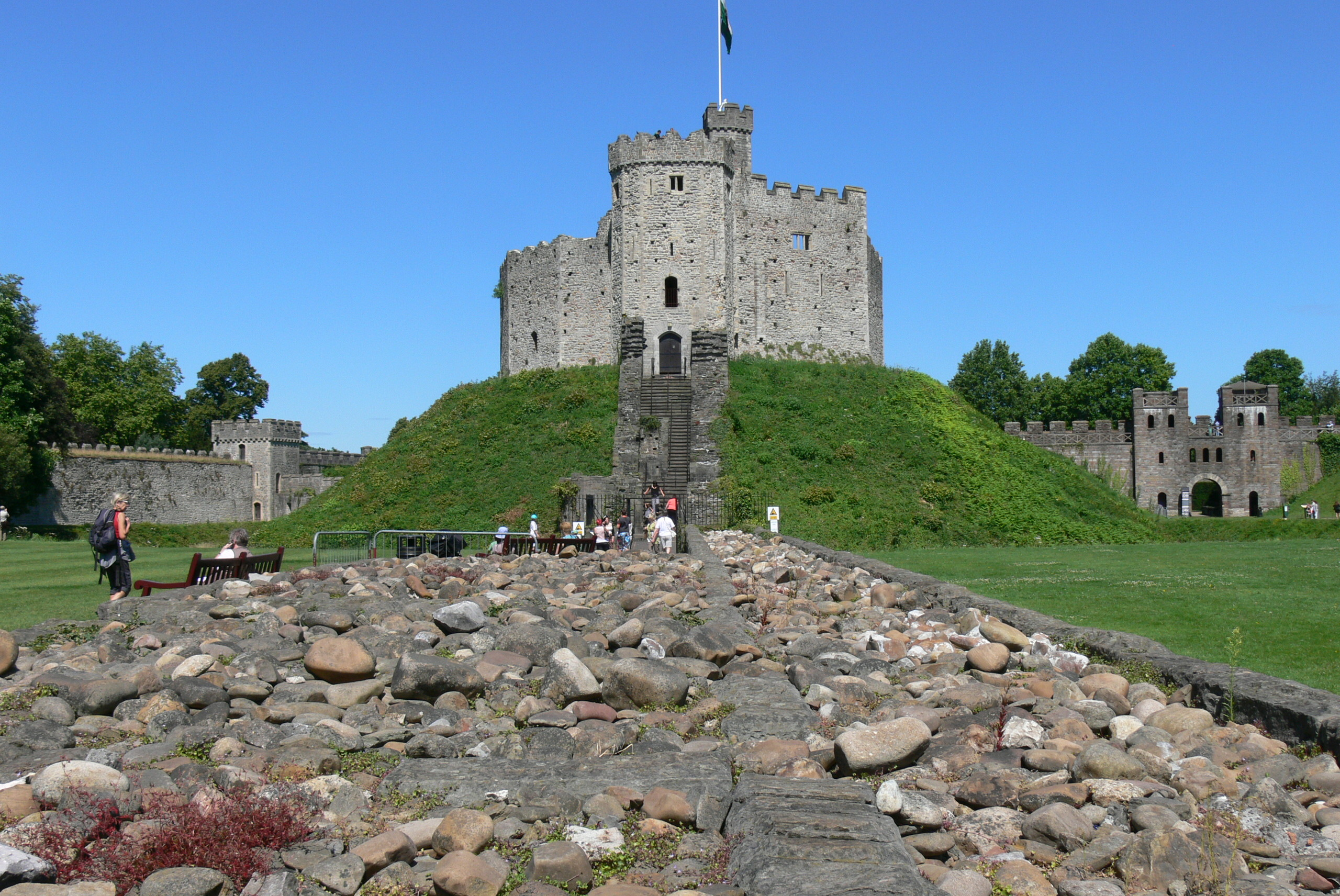

FitzHamon was fatally injured at the Battle of Tinchebray in 1106 and died shortly afterwards. Henry I then gave the castle in 1122 to Robert of Gloucester, the king's illegitimate son and the husband of FitzHamon's daughter, Mabe. After the failed attempt of Robert Curthose, duke of Normandy, William the Conqueror's eldest son, to take England from Henry I, the duke was moved here in 1126 from imprisonment at Devizes and remained imprisoned in the castle until his death in 1134. Robert of Gloucester held the castle during the troubled years of the Anarchy in England and Wales, and passed it on to his son, William Fitz Robert. Around the middle of the century, possibly under Robert of Gloucester, a 77-foot (23 m) wide, 30-foot (9 m) high shell keep was constructed on top of the motte, along with a stone wall around the south and west sides of the inner bailey. The polygonal shell keep has architectural links to a similar design at Arundel Castle. The building work was probably undertaken in response to the threat posed following the Welsh uprising of 1136.

Tensions with the Welsh continued, and in 1158 Ifor Bach raided the castle and took William hostage for a period. A further attack followed in 1183. By 1184 town walls had been built around Cardiff, and the West Gate to the town was constructed in the gap between the castle and the river. William died in 1183, leaving three daughters. One of these, Isabel, Countess of Gloucester, was declared the sole heir to the estate by Henry II. This was contrary to legal custom in England, and was done in order that Henry could then marry her to his youngest son Prince John and thus provide him with extensive lands. John later divorced Isabel, but he retained control of the castle until she married Geoffrey de Mandeville in 1214.

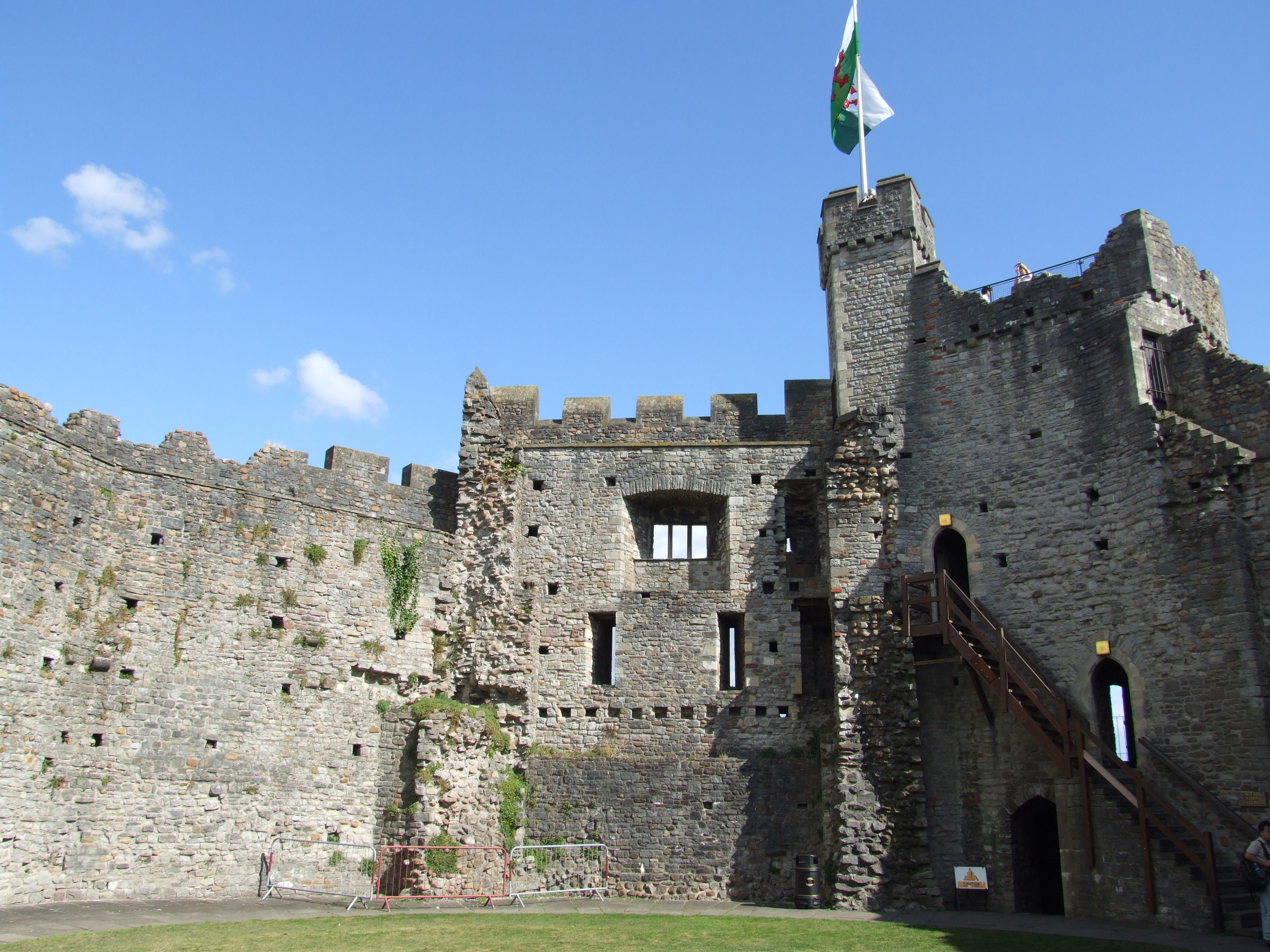
Interior of the keep

Upon Isabel's death in 1217 the castle passed through her sister to Gilbert de Clare, becoming part of the Honour of Clare, a major grouping of estates and fortifications in medieval England. The castle formed the centre of the family's power in South Wales, although the de Clares typically preferred to reside in their castles at Clare and Tonbridge. Gilbert's son, Richard de Clare, 6th Earl of Gloucester, carried out building work at the castle in the late 13th century, constructing the Black Tower that forms part of the southern gateway seen today. On the ground floor the tower contained the Stavell Oged and Stavell Wenn chambers, with three rooms constructed above them. Richard was also probably responsible for rebuilding the northern and eastern walls of the inner bailey in stone. The inner bailey was reached through a gatehouse on the eastern side, protected by two circular towers and later called the Exchequer Gate. The defensive work may have been prompted by the threat posed by the hostile Welsh leader Llywelyn ap Gruffudd, Prince of Wales.

Richard's grandson, Gilbert de Clare, the last male de Clare, died at the Battle of Bannockburn in 1314 and the castle was given to Hugh Despenser the Younger, the controversial favourite of Edward II. Poor harvests and harsh governance by the Despenser family encouraged a Welsh rebellion under Llywelyn Bren in 1316; this was crushed and Llywelyn was hanged, drawn and quartered in Cardiff Castle in 1318 on Hugh's orders. The execution attracted much criticism from across both the English and Welsh communities, and in 1321 Hugh arrested Sir William Fleminge as a scapegoat for the incident, first detaining him in the Black Tower and then executing him in the castle grounds. Conflict between the Despensers and the other Marcher Lords broke out soon after, leading to the castle being sacked in 1321 during the Despenser War. The Despensers recovered the castle and retained it for the rest of the century, despite the execution of Hugh Despenser for treason in 1326. Under a 1340 charter granted by the Despensers, the castle's constable was made the de facto mayor of Cardiff, controlling the local courts.

=== 15th–16th centuries ===
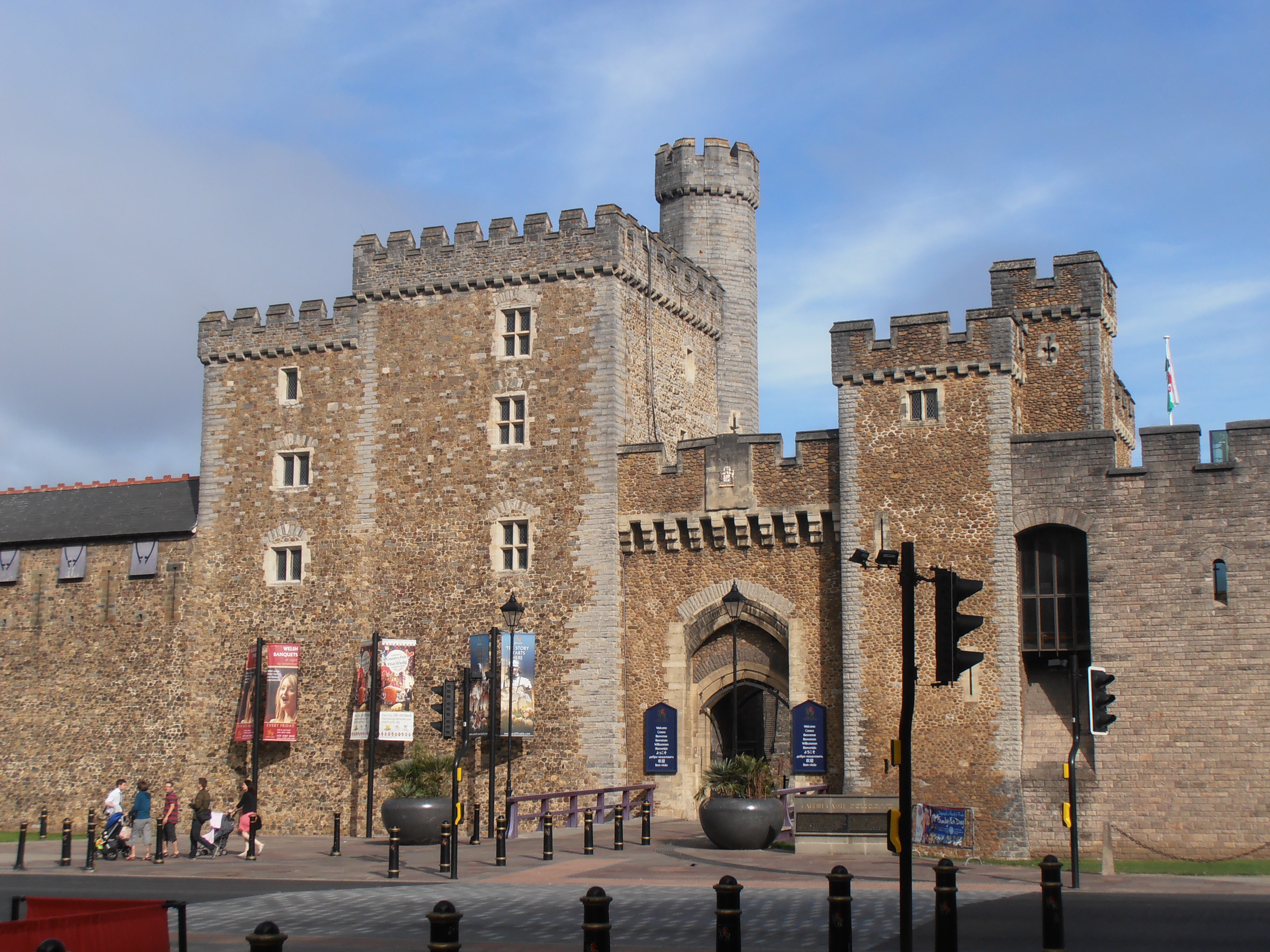
The South Gate, showing the restored 15th century Black Tower (l) and the barbican tower (r)

By the 15th century, the Despensers were increasingly using Caerphilly Castle as their main residence in the region rather than Cardiff. Thomas le Despenser was executed in 1400 on charges of conspiring against Henry IV. In 1401 rebellion broke out in North Wales under the leadership of Owain Glyndŵr, quickly spreading across the rest of the country. In 1404 Cardiff and the castle were taken by the rebels, causing considerable damage to the Black Tower and the southern gatehouse in the process. On Thomas's death the castle passed first to his young son, Richard, and on his death in 1414, through his daughter Isabel to the Beauchamp family. Isabel first married Richard de Beauchamp, the Earl of Worcester and then, on his death, to his cousin Richard de Beauchamp, the Earl of Warwick, in 1423.

Richard did not acquire Caerphilly Castle as part of the marriage settlement, so he set about redeveloping Cardiff instead. He built a new tower alongside the Black Tower in 1430, restoring the gateway, and extended the motte defences. He also constructed a substantial new domestic range in the south-west of the site between 1425 and 1439, with a central octagonal tower 75-foot (23 m) high, sporting defensive machicolations, and featuring four smaller polygonal turrets facing the inner bailey. The range was built of Lias ashlar stone with limestone used for some of the details, set upon the spur bases characteristic of South Wales and incorporated parts of the older 4th and 13th century walls. The buildings were influenced by similar work in the previous century at Windsor Castle and would in turn shape renovations at Newport and Nottingham Castles; the octagonal tower has architectural links to Guy's Tower, built at around the same time in Warwick Castle. A flower garden was built to the south of the range, with private access to Richard's chambers. Richard also rebuilt the town's wider defences, including a new stone bridge over the River Taff guarded by the West Gate, finishing the work by 1451.

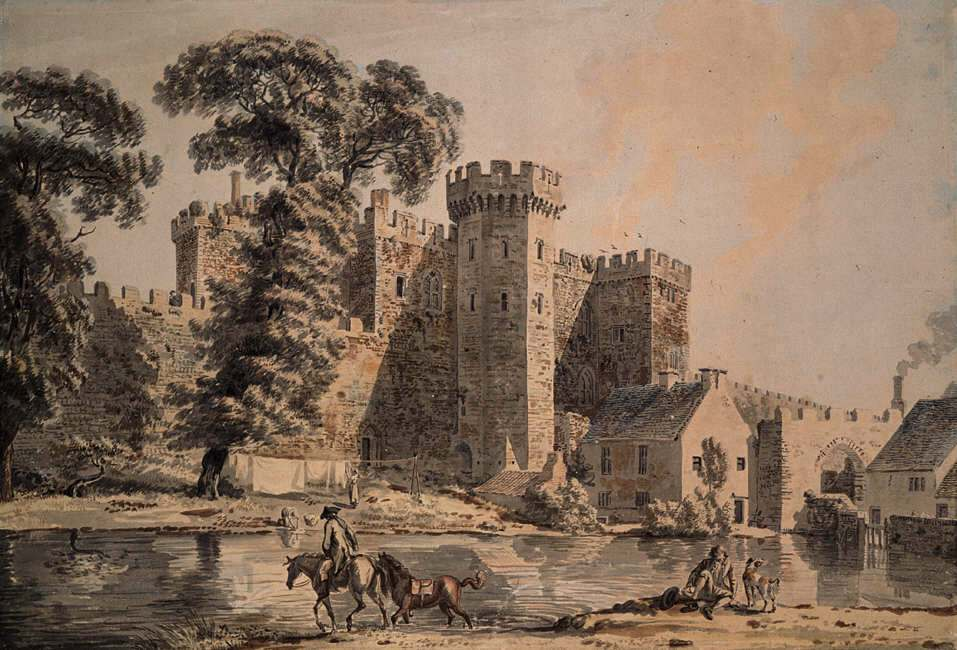
The 15th-century main lodgings and West Gate, shown in a late 18th-century watercolour by Paul Sandby

Cardiff Castle remained in the hands of Richard's son Henry and Henry's daughter Anne until 1449. When Anne died, it passed by marriage to Richard Neville, who held it until his death in 1471 during the period of civil strife known as the Wars of the Roses. As the conflict progressed and political fortunes rose and fell, the castle passed from George, the Duke of Clarence, to Richard, Duke of Gloucester, to Jasper Tudor, the Duke of Bedford, back to Richard Neville's wife Anne, back to Jasper and finally to Prince Henry, the future Henry VIII. The ascension of the Tudor dynasty to the English throne at the end of the wars heralded a change in the way Wales was administered. The Tudors were Welsh in origin, and their rule eased hostilities between the Welsh and English. As a result, defensive castles became less important. In 1495 Henry VII formally revoked the Marcher territory status of Cardiff Castle and the surrounding territories, bringing them under normal English law as the County of Glamorgan.

The Crown leased the castle to Charles Somerset in 1513; Charles used it while he was living in Cardiff. In 1550 William Herbert, later the Earl of Pembroke, then bought Cardiff Castle and the surrounding estates from Edward VI. The outer bailey contained a range of buildings at this time, and extensive building work was carried out during the century. The Shire Hall had been built in the outer bailey, forming part of a walled complex of buildings that included the lodgings for the traditional twelve holders of castle-guard lands. The outer bailey also included orchards, gardens and a chapel. The castle continued to be used to detain criminals during the 16th century, with the Black Tower being used as a prison to hold them; the heretic Thomas Capper was burnt at the castle on the orders of Henry VIII. The visiting antiquarian John Leland described the keep as "a great thing and strong, but now in some ruine", but the Black Tower was considered to be in good repair. In the inner bailey, the Herberts built an Elizabethan extension to the north end of the main lodgings, with large windows looking onto a new northern garden; the southern garden was replaced by a kitchen garden.

=== 17th–18th centuries ===
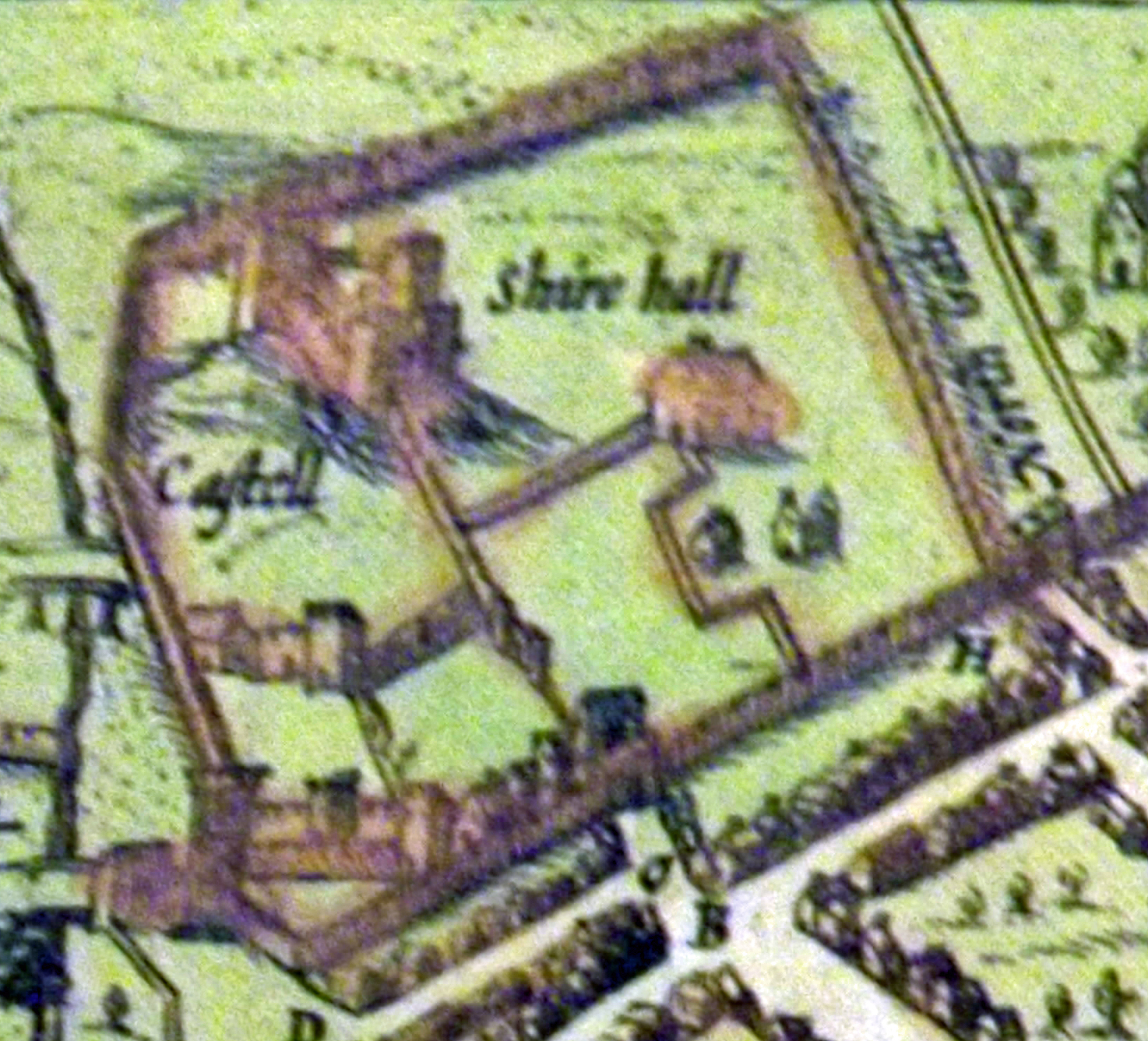
John Speed's depiction of the castle in 1610

In 1610 the cartographer John Speed produced a map of the castle, and noted that it was "large and in good repair." In 1642, however, civil war broke out between the rival Royalist supporters of King Charles I and Parliament. Cardiff Castle was then owned by Philip Herbert, a moderate Parliamentarian, and the castle was initially held by a pro-Royalist garrison. It was taken by Parliamentary forces in the early period of the war, according to popular tradition by a sneak attack using a secret passageway. The Royalist commander William Seymour, the Marquess of Hertford, then attacked the castle in turn, taking it in a surprise assault. Parliamentary forces and local troops then immediately besieged the castle, retaking it after five hours of fighting and reinstalling a garrison. In early 1645 Mr Carne, the High Sheriff, rebelled against Parliament, taking Cardiff town but initially failing to seize the castle. The King sent forces from Oxford, under the command of Sir Charles Kemys, to reinforce Carne but Parliament despatched a naval squadron to provide support to their forces from the sea. A small battle ensued before the castle was taken by the Royalists.

With the Royalist military position across the country worsening, King Charles himself came to Cardiff Castle that July to meet with local Welsh leaders. Relations between his commander in the region, Sir Charles Gerard, and the people of Glamorgan had deteriorated badly and when Charles left the castle, he was confronted by a small army of angry locals, demanding to be given control of the castle. These clubmen then declared themselves the "Peaceable Army" and increased their demands to include near independence for the region. After negotiations, a compromise was found in which the royal garrison would quit the castle, to be replaced by a local Glamorgan force, commanded by Sir Richard Beaupré; in return, £800 and a force of a thousand men were promised to Charles. In September, Charles returned to South Wales and reneged on the agreement, disbanding the Peaceable Army, but his military position in the region was collapsing. The Peaceable Army's leaders switched sides and forced the surrender of Cardiff and the castle to Parliament in mid-September.

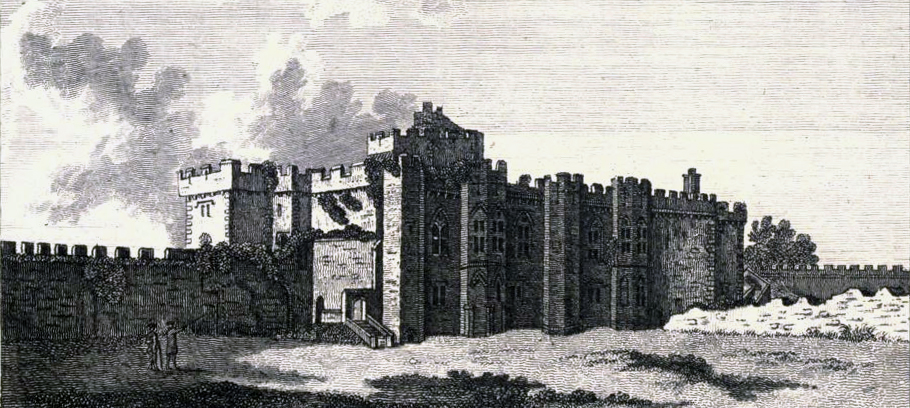
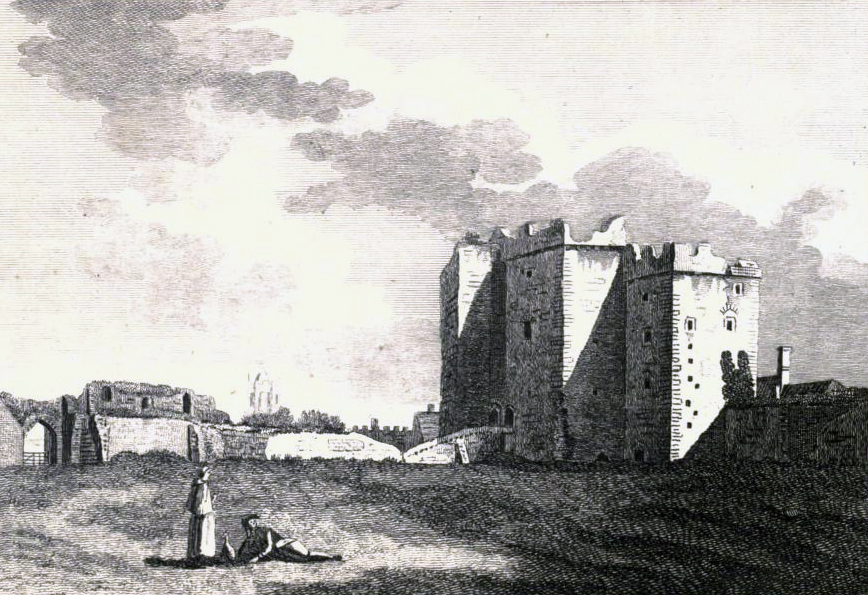
The main lodgings in 1785 (l) and the south gateway (r), showing the internal bailey wall destroyed by Capability Brown

With the outbreak of fresh fighting in 1648, a Royalist army of 8,000 fresh recruits was mustered under the command of General Rowland Laugharne and Sir Edward Stradling, with the intent of retaking Cardiff. Parliamentary forces in Brecon under the command of Colonel Thomas Horton moved quickly to reinforce the castle, although with only 3,000 men they were content to wait until a larger army under Oliver Cromwell could arrive from Gloucester. With time against them, the Royalist army attacked, leading to the battle of St Fagans just to the west of Cardiff, and a heavy Royalist defeat.

After the war, Cardiff Castle escaped the slighting, or deliberate damage and destruction, that affected many other castles. Probably because of the threat of a pro-Royalist invasion by the Presbyterian Scots, a Parliamentary garrison was installed instead and the castle remained intact. The Herberts continued to own the castle as the Earls of Pembroke, both during the interregnum and after the restoration of Charles II. The castle's constable continued to act as mayor of the town of Cardiff, controlling the meetings of the town's burgesses, bailiffs and aldermen; the Herberts usually appointed members of the more important local gentry to this position during the period.

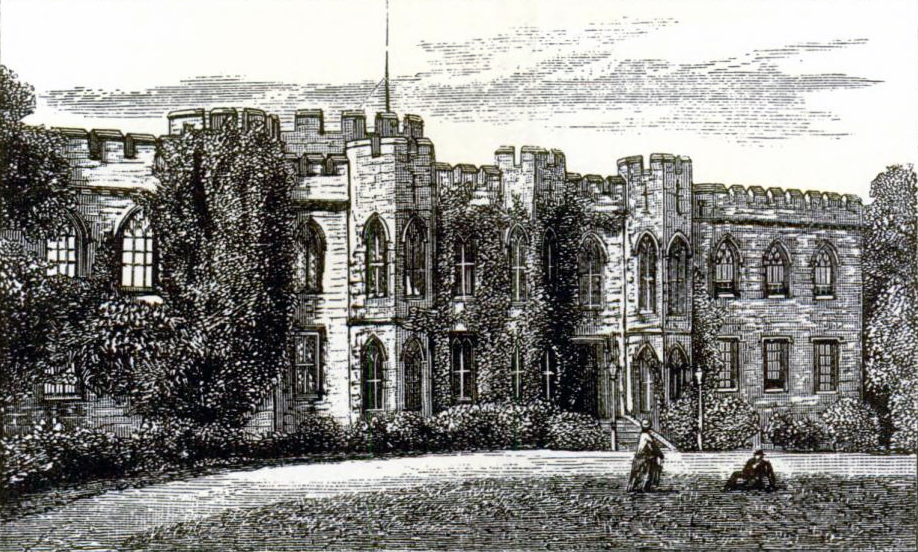
The Georgian main lodgings, depicted in the mid-19th century

Lady Charlotte Herbert was the last of the family to control Cardiff Castle. She married twice, latterly to Thomas, Viscount Windsor, and on her death in 1733 the castle passed to their son, Herbert. Herbert's daughter, Charlotte Jane Windsor, married, in November 1766, John, Lord Mount Stuart, who rose to become the Marquess of Bute in 1794, beginning a family line that would control the castle for the next century.

In 1776, Bute began to renovate the property with the intention of turning it into a residence for his son, John. The grounds were radically altered under a programme of work that involved Capability Brown and his son-in-law, Henry Holland. The stone wall that separated the inner and outer baileys was destroyed using gunpowder, the Shire Hall and the knights' houses in the outer bailey were destroyed and the remaining ground partially flattened; the whole of the area was laid with turf. Considerable work was carried out on the main lodgings, demolishing the Herbert additions, building two new wings and removing many of the older features to produce a more contemporary, 18th-century appearance. The keep and motte was stripped of the ivy and trees that had grown up them, and a spiral path was laid down around the motte. The motte's moat was filled in as part of the landscaping. A summer house was built in the south-east corner of the castle. Further work was planned on the property, including a reported proposal to roof the keep in copper, insert new windows and turn it into an assembly room for dances, but these projects were cut short by the death of Bute's son in 1794.

=== 19th century ===
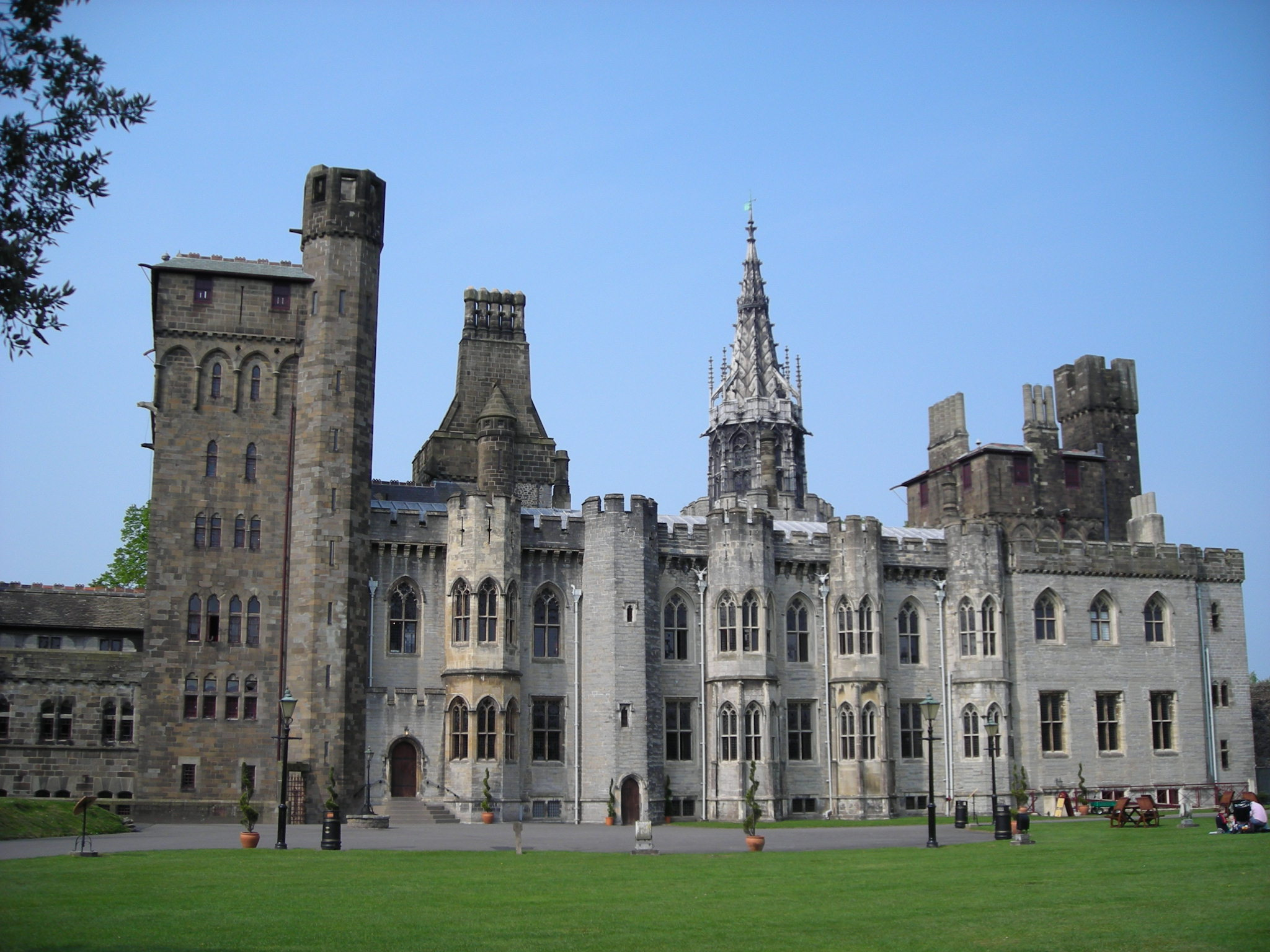
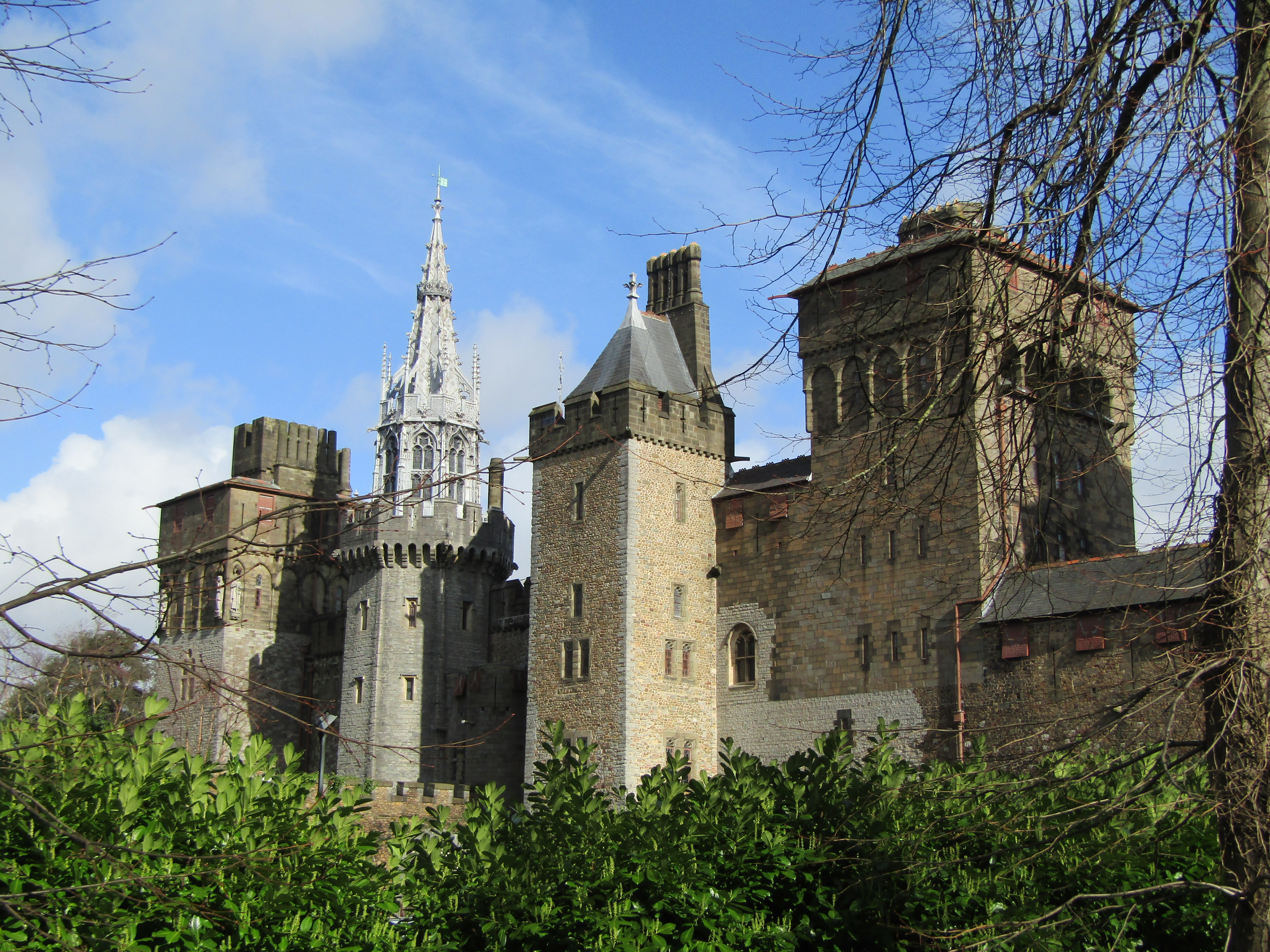
The main lodgings seen from the gardens (l) and from outside the castle (r)

In 1814 Bute's grandson, John, inherited his title and the castle. In 1825 the new marquess began a sequence of investments in the Cardiff Docks, an expensive programme of work that would enable Cardiff to become a major coal exporting port. Although the docks were not particularly profitable, they transformed the value of the Butes' mining and land interests, making the family immensely wealthy. By 1900, the family estate owned 22,000 acres (8,900 ha) of land in Glamorgan.

The second marquess preferred to live on the Isle of Bute in Scotland and only used Cardiff Castle occasionally. The castle saw little investment and only four full-time servants were maintained on the premises, meaning that cooked food had to be brought across from the kitchens at a nearby hotel. The castle remained at the centre of the Butes' political power base in Cardiff, however, with their faction sometimes termed "the Castle party". During the violent protests of the Merthyr Rising of 1831, the marquess based himself at Cardiff Castle, from which he directed operations and kept Whitehall informed of the unfolding events. The governance of the then town of Cardiff was finally reformed by an Act of Parliament in 1835, introducing a town council and a mayor, severing the link with the castle constable.

The Clock Tower and the Astronomical Statues

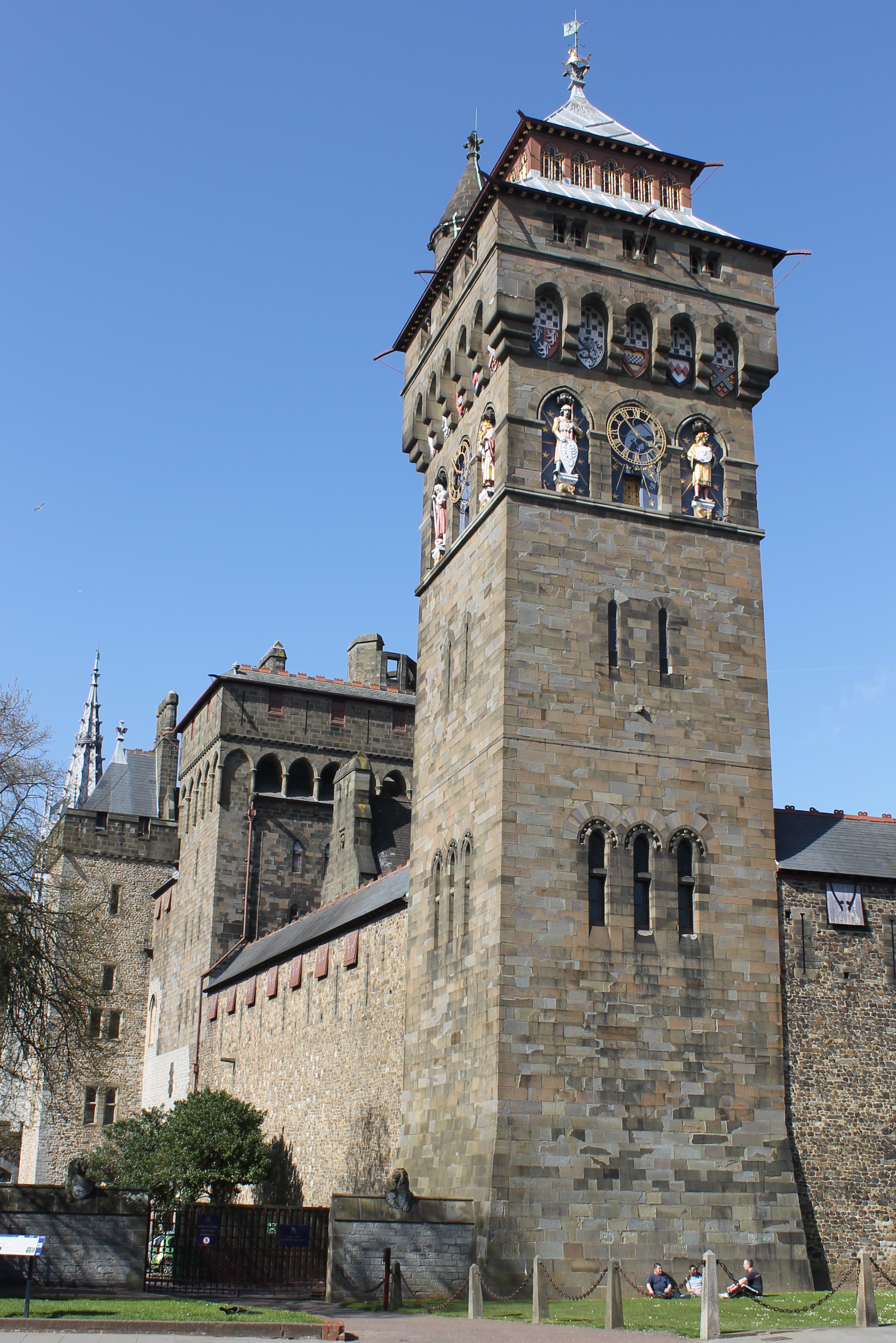
The Clock Tower

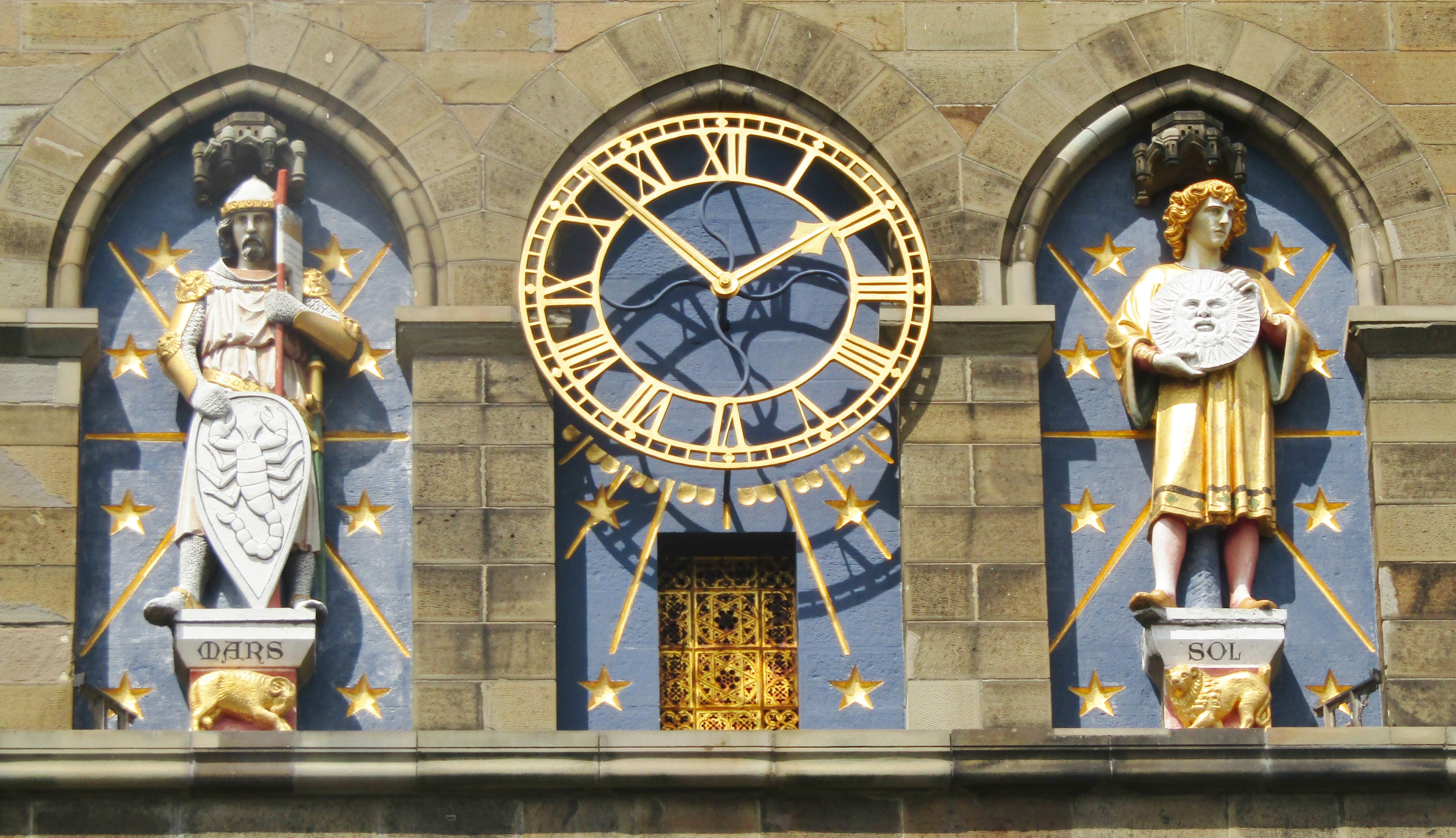
Mars and Sol (Sun)

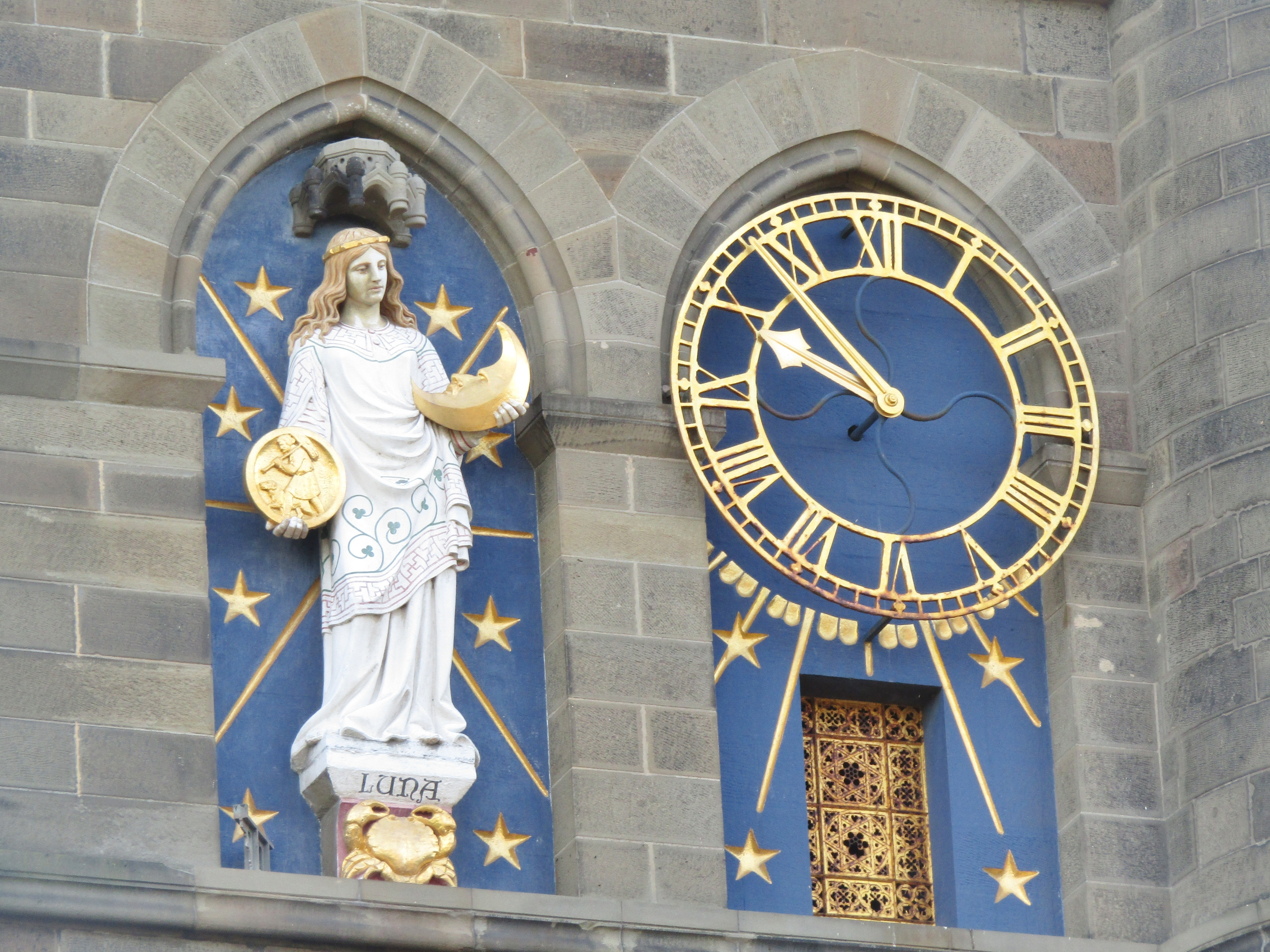
Luna (Moon)

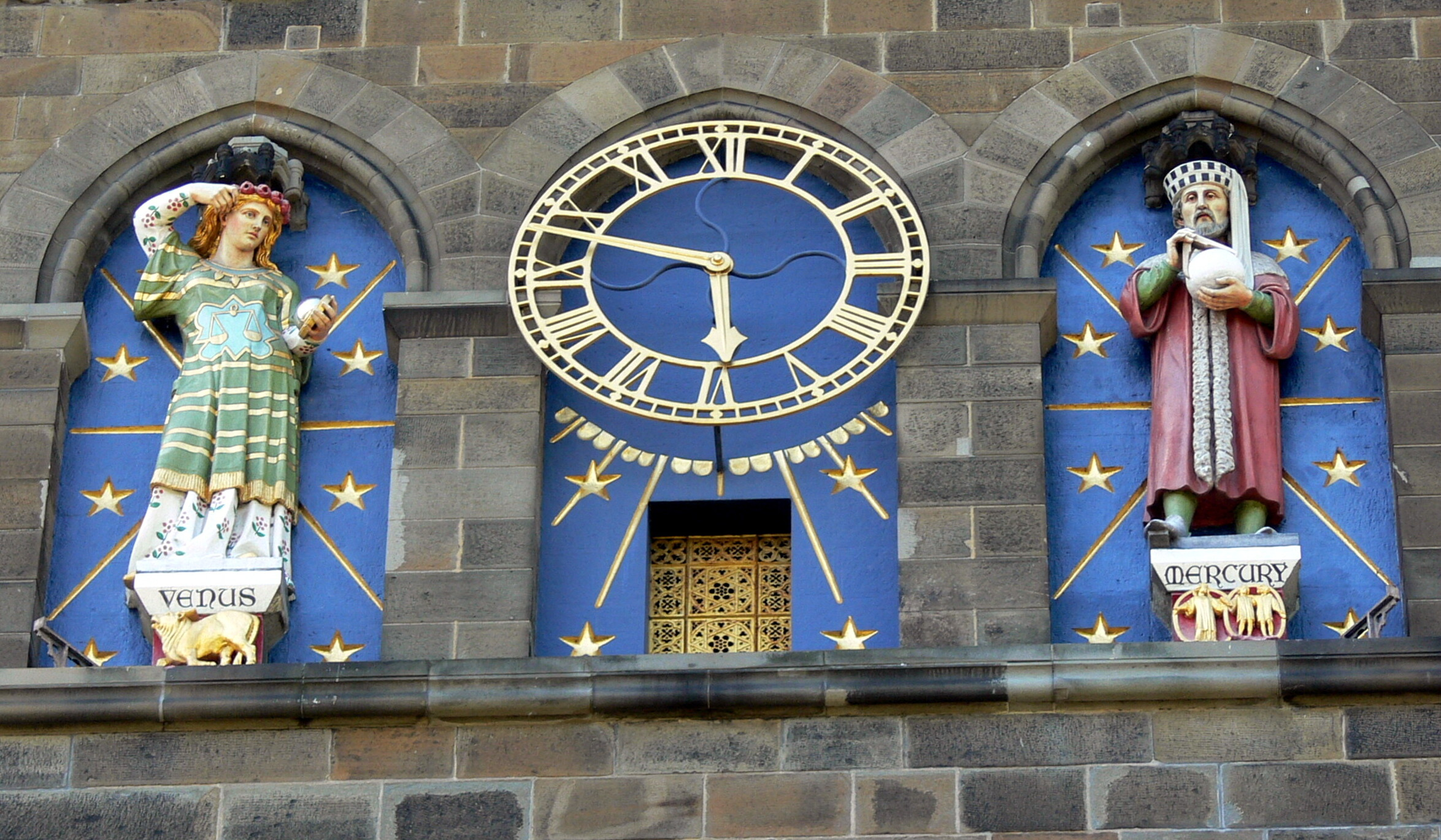
Venus and Mercury

John, 3rd Marquess of Bute, inherited the title and castle in 1848. He was then less than a year old, and as he grew up he came to despise the existing castle, believing that it represented a mediocre, half-hearted example of the Gothic style. The young Lord Bute engaged the architect William Burges to undertake the remodelling of the castle. The two shared a passion in medieval Gothic Revivalism and this, combined with Bute's huge financial resources, enabled Burges to rebuild the property on a grand scale. Burges brought with him almost of all of the team that had supported him on earlier projects, including John Starling Chapple, William Frame and Horatio Lonsdale. Burges's contribution, in particular his research into the history of the castle and his architectural imagination, was critical to the transformation.

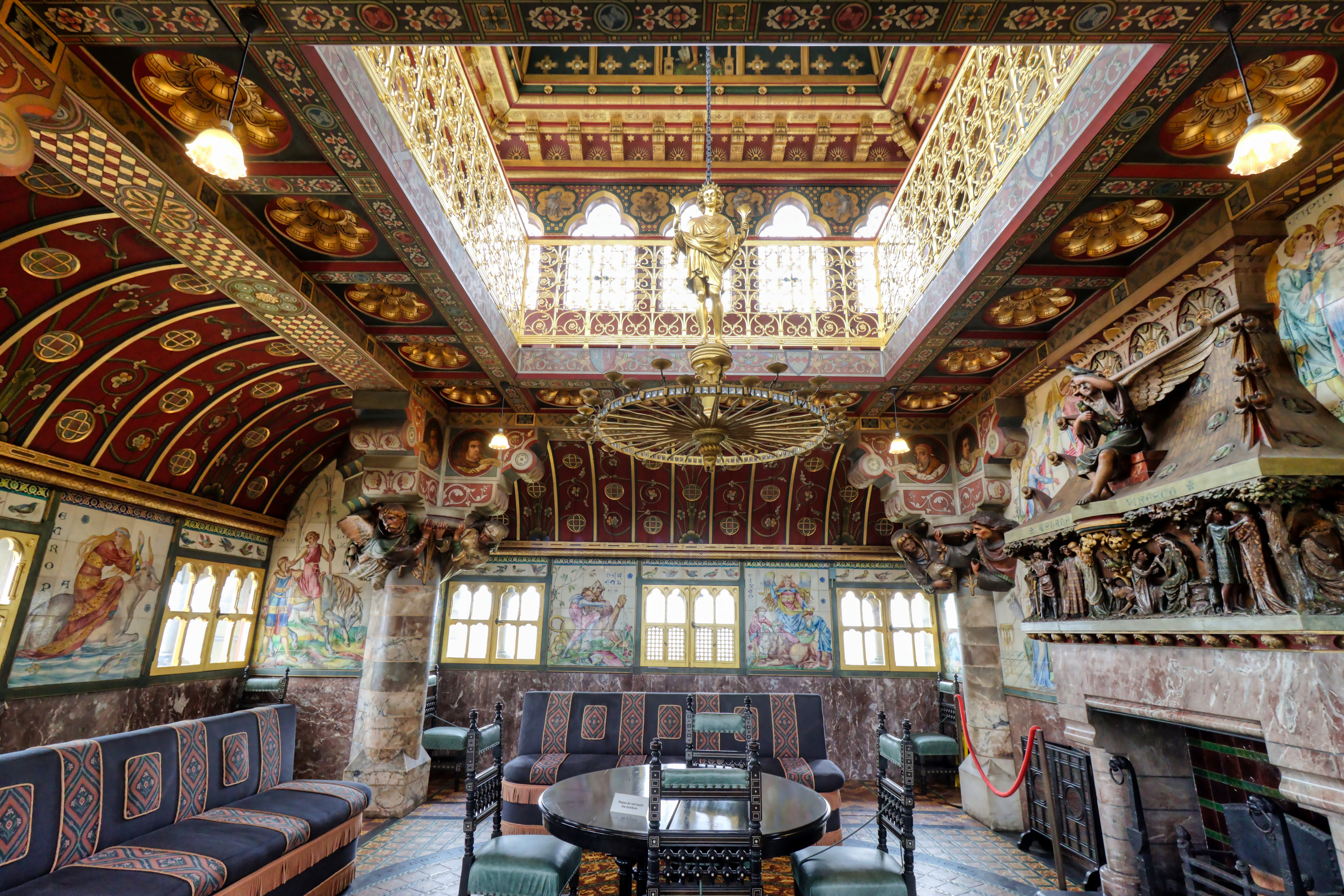
The smoking room of the clock tower

Work began on Lord Bute's coming of age in 1868 with the construction of the 132-foot (40 m) high Clock Tower. The tower, built in Burges's signature ashlar stone from the Forest of Dean, formed a suite of bachelor's rooms, comprising a bedroom, a servant's room and the Summer and Winter smoking rooms. Externally, the tower was a re-working of a design Burges had previously used in an unsuccessful competition entry for the Royal Courts of Justice in London. The tower contains 7 ornate statues standing 9-foot (2.7 m) tall and carved in stone representing Mercury, Luna (moon), Mars, Jupiter, Saturn, Venus and Sol (sun). The statues were created by Thomas Nicholls and he began carving them in 1869, and they were painted for the first time in 1873. As well as the statues, the tower is decorated on each side with five shields, which are reliefs of the coat of arms of the marquess' family and those of other families that married into it; Stewart (of Bute), Crichton, Herbert, Windsor and Montagu. Internally, the rooms were sumptuously decorated with gildings, carvings and cartoons, many allegorical in style, depicting the seasons, myths and fables. In his A History of the Gothic Revival, written as the tower was being built, Charles Locke Eastlake wrote of Burges's "peculiar talents (and) luxuriant fancy." The Summer Smoking Room rested at the top of the structure and was two storeys high with an internal balcony that, through an unbroken band of windows, gave views of the Cardiff Docks, the Bristol Channel, and the Glamorgan countryside. The floor had a map of the world in mosaic. The sculpture was also created by Thomas Nicholls.

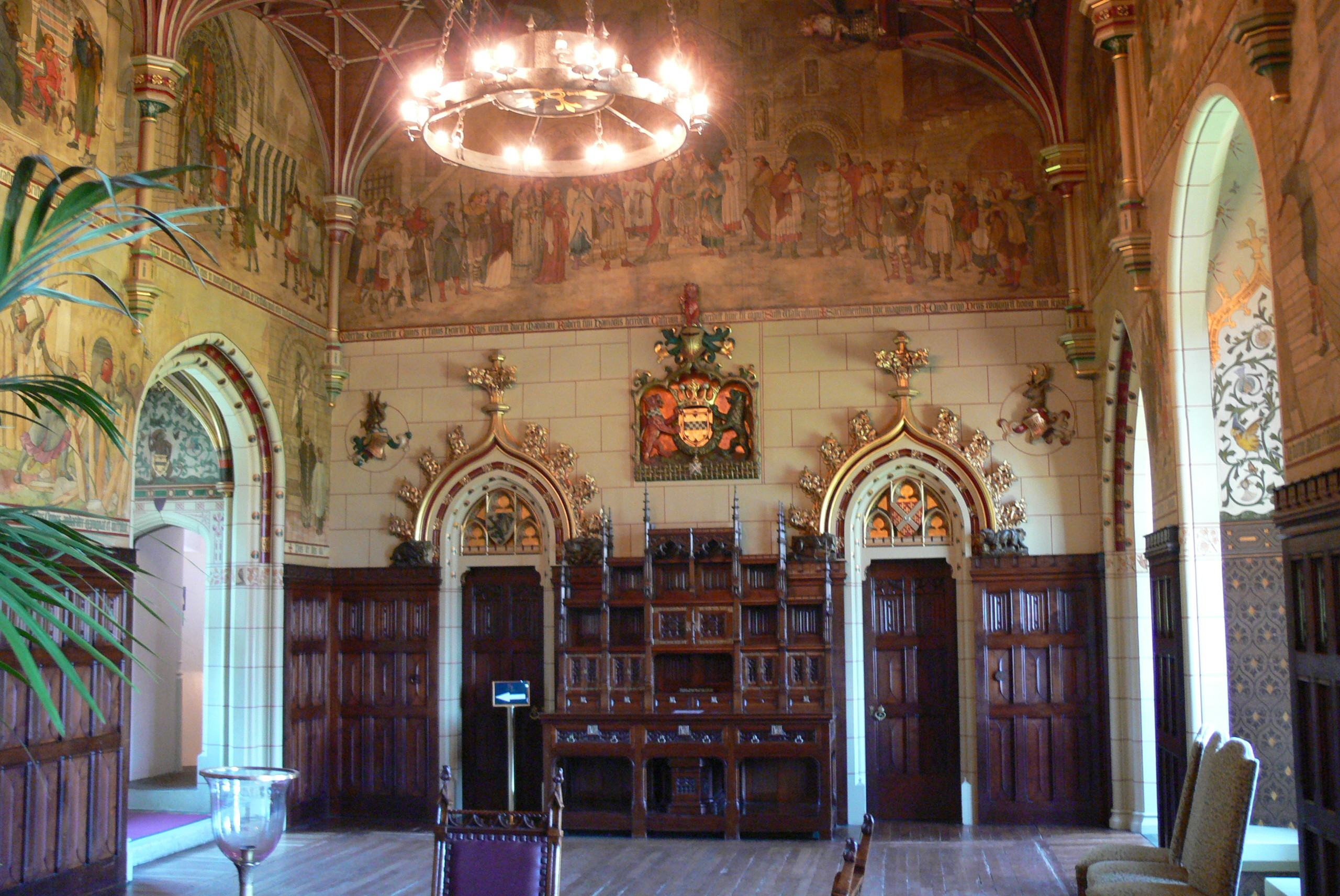
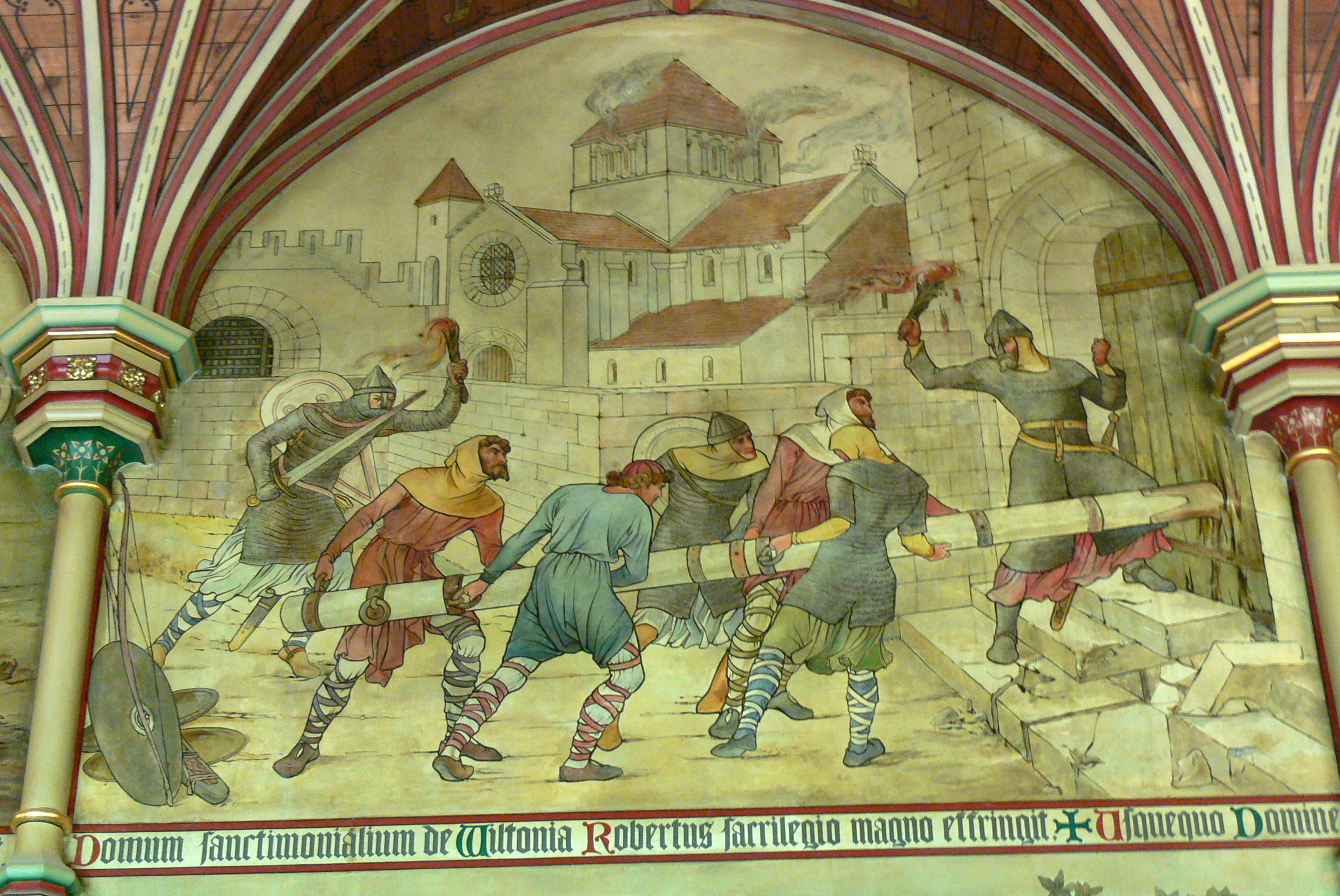
Banqueting room (l) and detail (r)

As the rest of the castle was developed, work progressed along the rest of the 18th century range including the construction of the Guest Tower, the Arab Room, the Chaucer Room, the Nursery, the Library, the Banqueting Hall and bedrooms for both Lord and Lady Bute. In plan, the new castle followed the arrangement of a standard Victorian country house quite closely. The Bute Tower included Lord Bute's bedroom and ended in another highlight, the Roof Garden, featuring a sculpture of the Madonna and child by Ceccardo Fucigna. Bute's bedroom contained extensive religious iconography and an en-suite bathroom. The Octagon Tower followed, including an oratory, built on the spot where Bute's father died, and the Chaucer Room, the roof of which is considered by historian Mark Girouard to be a "superb example of Burges's genius".

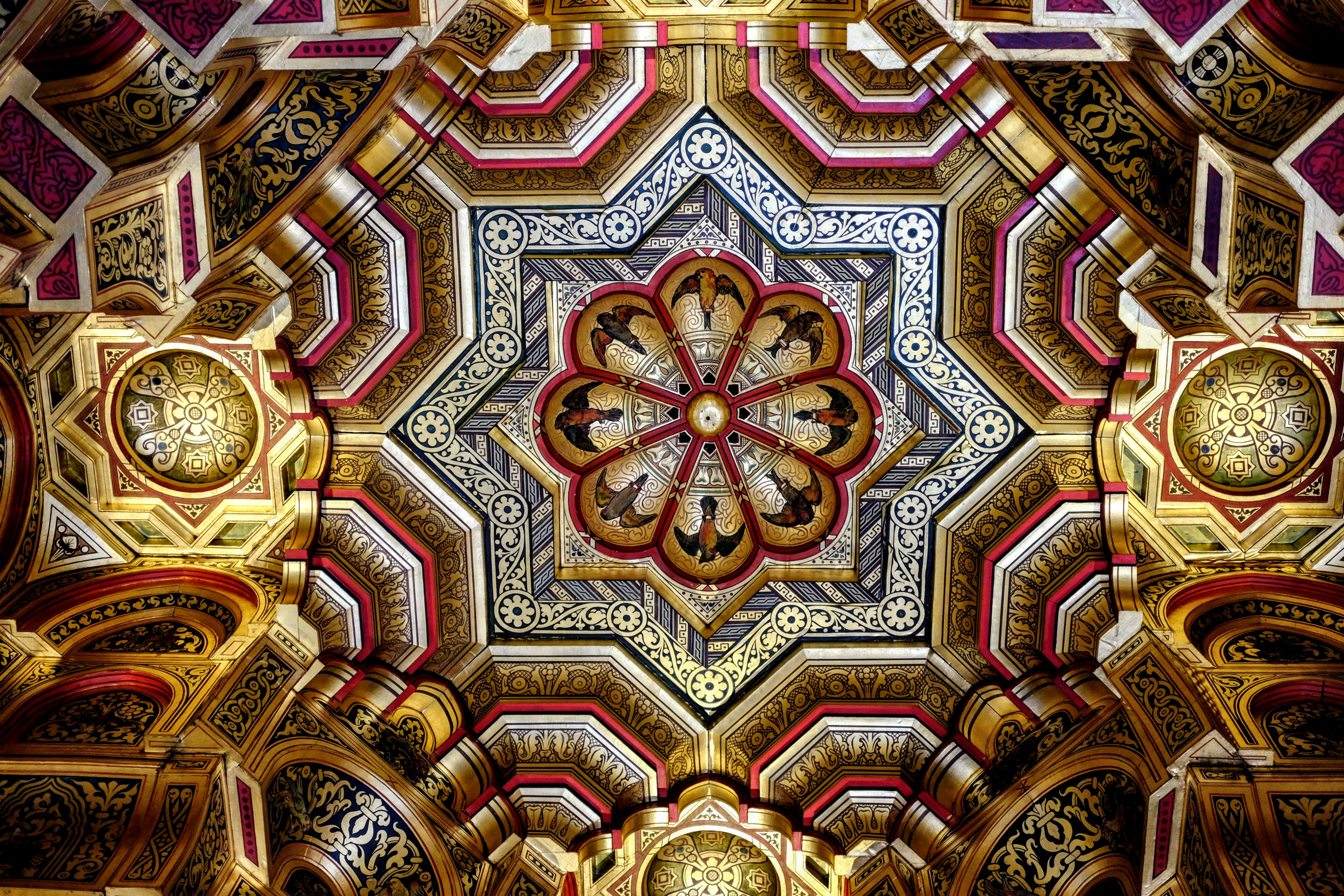
The Arab Room ceiling

The central part of the castle comprised a two-storey banqueting hall, with the library below. Both are enormous, the latter to hold part of the bibliophile marquess's vast library. Both included elaborate carvings and fireplaces, those in the banqueting hall depicting the castle itself in the time of Robert, Duke of Normandy. The decoration here is less impressive than elsewhere in the castle, as much of it was completed after Burges's death by Lonsdale, a less talented painter. The Arab Room in the Herbert Tower remains however one of Burges's masterpieces. Its jelly mould ceiling in a Moorish style is particularly notable. It was this room on which Burges was working when he died and Bute placed Burges's initials, and his own, and the date 1881 in the fireplace as a memorial. The central portion of the castle also included the Grand Staircase, recorded in a watercolour perspective prepared by Axel Haig.

Burges's interiors at Cardiff Castle have been widely praised. The historian Megan Aldrich considers them amongst "the most magnificent that the gothic revival ever achieved", J. Mordaunt Crook has described them as "three dimensional passports to fairy kingdoms and realms of gold", and John Newman praises them as "most successful of all the fantasy castles of the nineteenth century." The exterior of the castle, however, has received a more mixed reception from critics. Crook admires the variegated and romantic silhouette of the building, but architect John Grant considered them to present a "picturesque if not happy combination" of varying historical styles, and Adrian Pettifer criticises them as "incongruous" and excessively Gothic in style.

Work was also carried out on the castle grounds, the interior being flattened further, destroying much of the medieval and Roman archaeological remains. In 1889, Lord Bute's building works uncovered the remains of the old Roman fort for the first time since the 11th century, leading to archaeological investigations being carried out in 1890. New walls in a Roman style were built by William Frame on the foundations of the originals, complete with a reconstructed Roman North Gate, and the outer medieval bank was stripped away around the new walls.

The Animal Wall

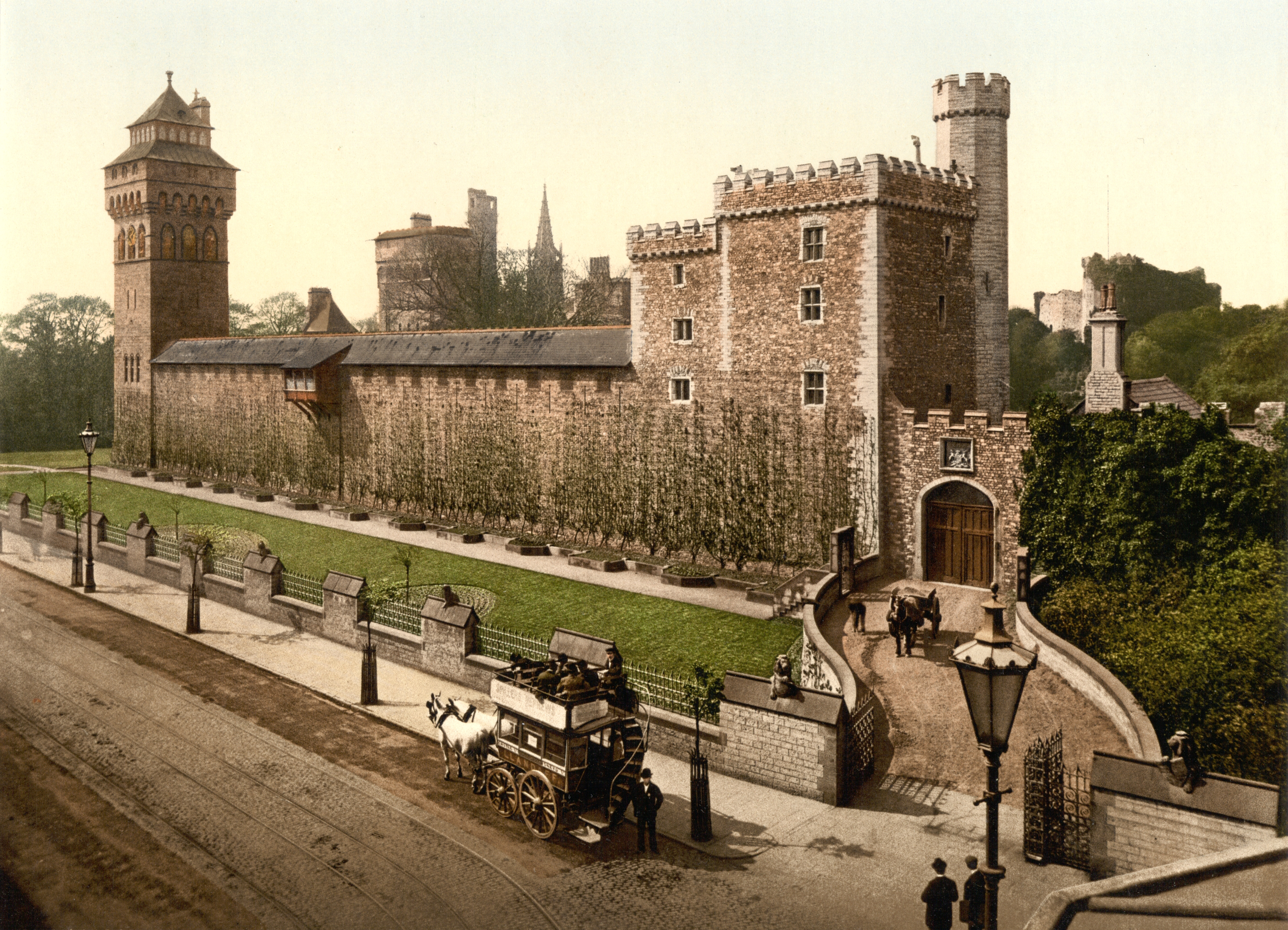
The Animal Wall in front of Cardiff Castle (c. 1890)

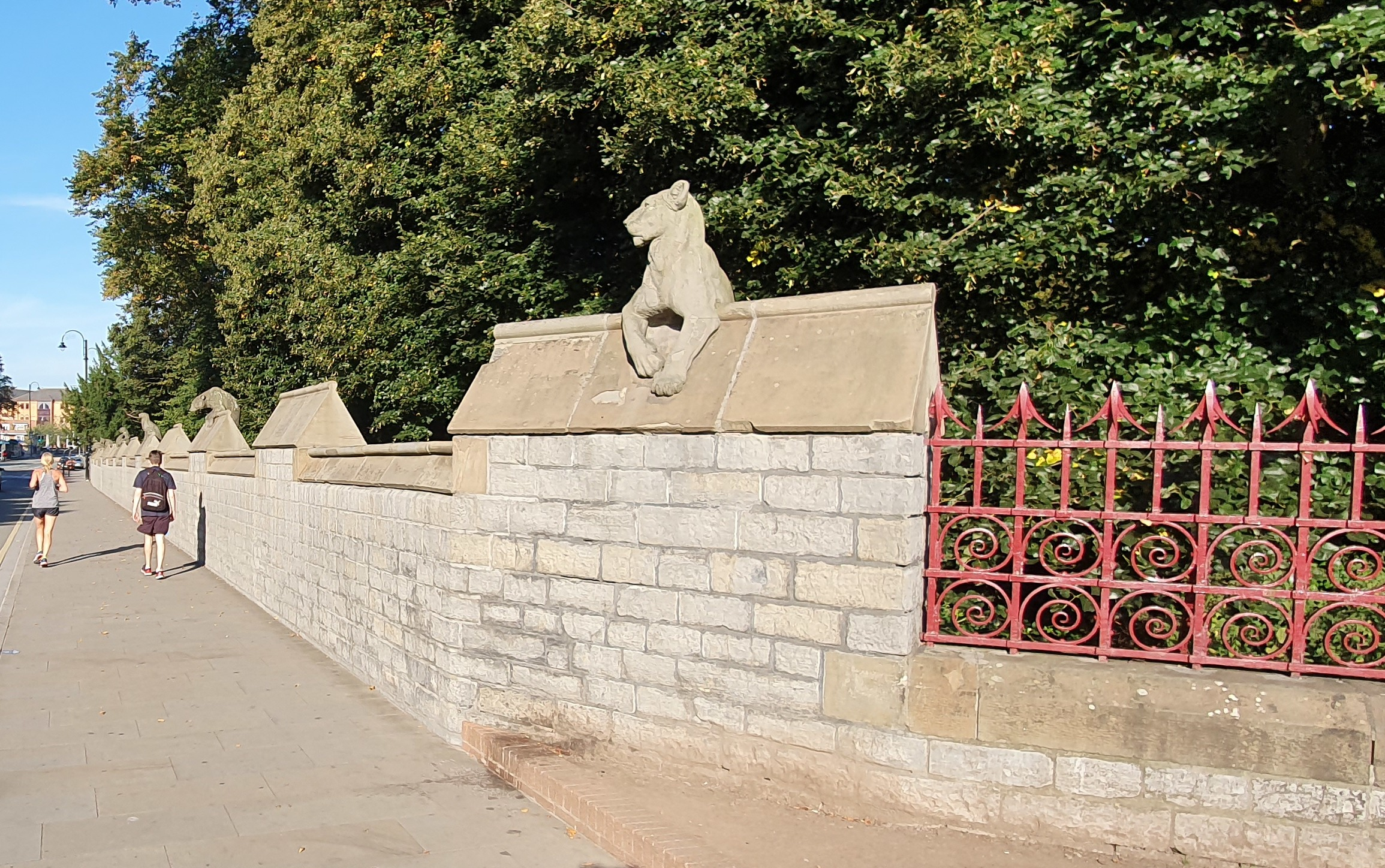
The Animal Wall on Castle Street in Bute Park

The grounds were extensively planted with trees and shrubs, including over the motte. From the late 18th century until the 1850s the castle grounds were completely open to the public, but restrictions were imposed in 1858 and as a replacement the 434 acres of land to the west and north of the castle was turned into Bute Park. From 1868, the castle grounds were closed to the public altogether. Stables were built just to the north of the castle, but only half were completed during the 19th century. The Animal Wall was built along the south side of the castle, decorated with statues of animals, and the Swiss Bridge – a combination of summerhouse and river-crossing – was erected over the river by the West Gate. Cathays Park was built on the east side of the castle, but was sold to the city of Cardiff in 1898.

=== 20th and 21st centuries ===
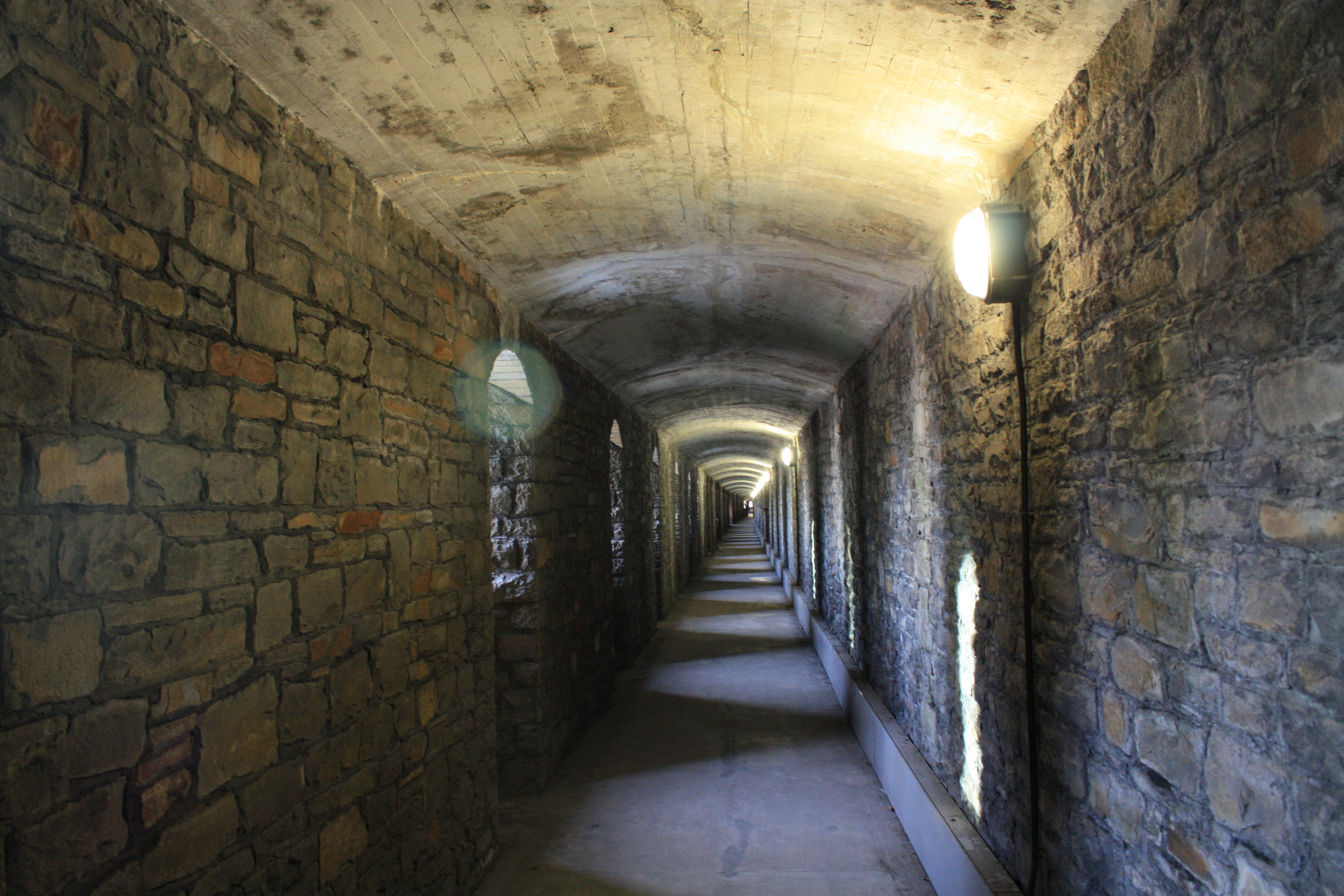
One of the tunnels within the castle walls, used as air raid shelters during the Second World War

John, the fourth marquess, acquired the castle in 1900 on the death of his father, and the family estates and investments around the castle began to rapidly reduce in size. Cardiff had grown hugely in the previous century, its population increasing from 1,870 in 1800 to around 250,000 in 1900, but the coal trade began to diminish after 1918 and industry suffered during the depression of the 1920s. John only inherited a part of the Butes' Glamorgan estates, and in the first decades of the 20th century he sold off much of the remaining assets around Cardiff, including the coal mines, docks and railway companies, with the bulk of the land interests being finally sold off or nationalised in 1938.

Development work on the castle continued. There was extensive restoration of the medieval masonry in 1921, with architect John Grant rebuilding the South Gate and the barbican tower, and reconstructing the medieval West Gate and town wall alongside the castle, with the Swiss Bridge being moved in 1927 to make room for the new West Gate development. Further archaeological investigations were carried out into the Roman walls in 1922 and 1923, leading to Grant redesigning the northern Roman gatehouse. The second half of the castle stables were finally completed. The Animal Wall was moved in the 1920s to the west side of the castle to enclose a pre-Raphaelite themed garden. The grand staircase in the main lodgings was torn out in the 1930s. During World War II, extensive tunnels within the medieval walls were used as air-raid shelters, with eight different sections, able to hold up to 1,800 people in total, and the castle was also used to tether barrage balloons above the city.

In 1947, John, the fifth marquess, inherited the castle on the death of his father and faced considerable death duties. He sold the very last of the Bute lands in Cardiff and gave the castle and the surrounding park to the city on behalf of the people of Cardiff; the family flag was taken down from the castle as part of the official hand-over ceremony. The castle was protected as a grade I listed building and as a scheduled monument. The castle grounds are listed Grade I, jointly with Bute Park, on the Cadw/ICOMOS Register of Parks and Gardens of Special Historic Interest in Wales.

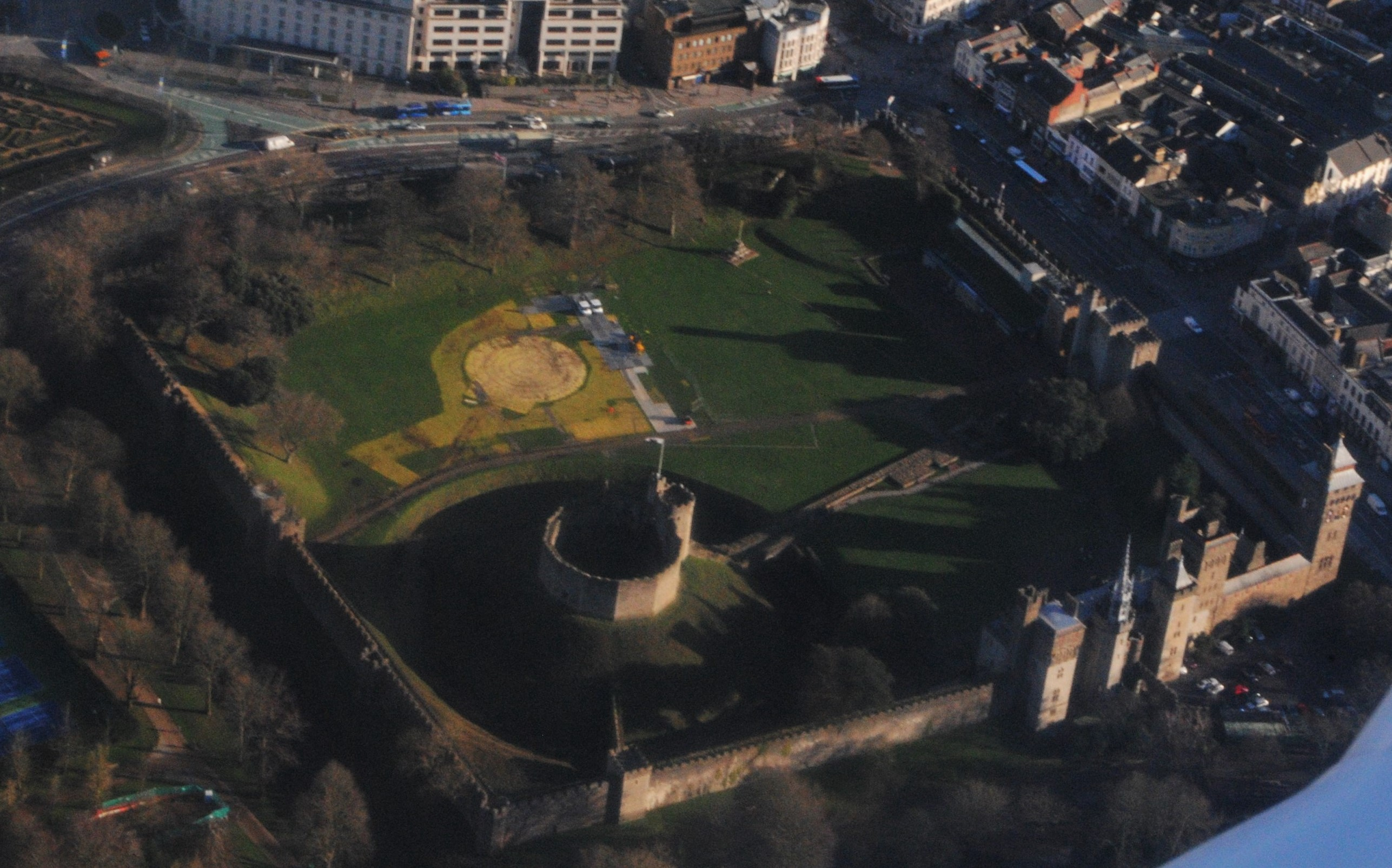
The castle from the air

Cardiff Castle is now run as a tourist attraction, and is one of the most popular sites in the city. The castle is not fully furnished, as the furniture and fittings in the castle were removed by the marquess in 1947 and subsequently disposed of; an extensive restoration has been carried out, however, of the fittings originally designed for the Clock Tower by Burges. The Royal Welsh College of Music and Drama, founded in 1949, was housed in the castle's main lodgings for many years, but moved into the castle's former stables north of the castle in 1998. A new interpretation centre, which opened in 2008, was built alongside the South Gate at a cost of £6 million, and the castle also contains "Firing Line", the joint regimental museum of the 1st The Queen's Dragoon Guards and the Royal Welsh.

The castle has been used for a range of cultural and social events. The castle has seen various musical performances, including by Westlife, Tom Jones, A-HA, Green Day and the Stereophonics, with a capacity to accommodate over 10,000 people. During the 1960s and 1970s the castle was the setting for a sequence of military tattoos.

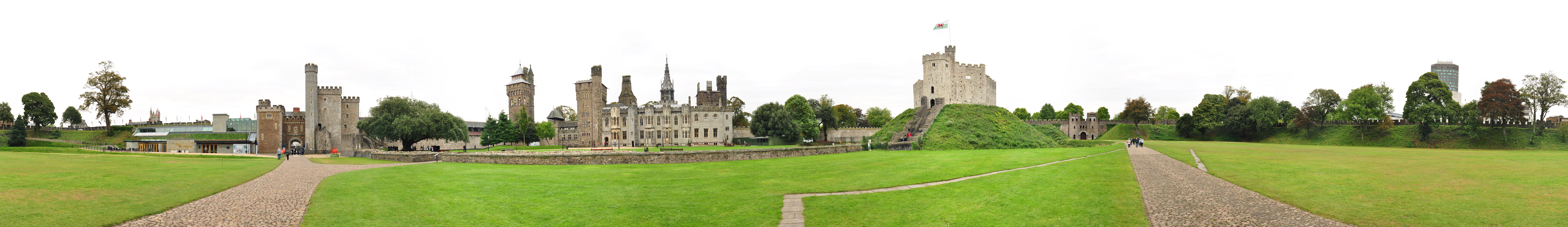
360° panorama of the grounds of Cardiff Castle, showing (l to r) the interpretation centre, the barbican and South Gate, the Black Tower, the Clock Tower and the main lodgings, the reconstructed Roman Wall, the shell keep on the motte, the North Gate, and the Norman banked earth defences

== See also ==
- List of castles in Wales
- Castles in Great Britain and Ireland
- Grade I listed buildings in Cardiff
- List of tallest buildings in Cardiff
