= Le Mesnil =

Le Mesnil may refer to:

== Places ==
Le Mesnil or le Mesnail is the name or part of the name of several places:

=== Belgium ===
- Le Mesnil, Belgium, a commune in the municipality of Viroinval in the Namur province

=== France ===
Mesnil and Le Mesnil is the name or part of the name of several communes or former communes in France:

- Le Mesnil, in the Manche département
- Le Mesnil-Amelot, in the Seine-et-Marne département
- Le Mesnil Auzouf, in the Calvados département
- Le Mesnil Bacley, in the Calvados département
- Le Mesnil-Benoist, in the Calvados département
- Le Mesnil-Bœuf, a former commune that is now a part of Isigny-le-Buat in the Manche département
- Le Mesnil-Bonant, a former commune that is now a part of Gavray in the Manche département
- Le Mesnil Caussois, in the Calvados département
- Le Mesnil Dray, a former commune that is now a part of Foligny in the Manche département
- Le Mesnil Durand, in the Calvados département
- Le Mesnil-Esnard, in the Seine-Maritime département
- Le Mesnil-Eudes, in the Calvados département
- Le Mesnil Germain, in the Calvados département
- Le Mesnil au Grain, in the Calvados département
- Le Mesnil Guillaume, in the Calvados département
- Le Mesnil-Hue, a former commune that is now part of Gavray in the Manche département
- Le Mesnil-Mauger, in the Calvados département
- Le Mesnil-sur-Oger, in the Marne département
- Le Mesnil-Patry, in the Calvados département
- Le Mesnil-Robert, in the Calvados département
- Le Mesnil-Simon (disambiguation)
- Le Mesnil-sur-Blangy, in the Calvados département
- Le Mesnil-Thébault, a former commune that is now a part of Isigny-le-Buat in the Manche département
- Le Mesnil Villement, in the Calvados département
- Mesnil-Clinchamps, in the Calvados département

== See also ==
- Mesnil (disambiguation)
- Les Mesnuls, an interesting name variant in the Yvelines département
