= Mesnil =

Mesnil is derived from Latin mansionile, meaning a small mansio or dwelling, and may refer to:

== Places ==
=== Municipalities ===
- Mesnil, Mauritius, a suburb in the town of Vacoas-Phoenix
- Mesnil-Bruntel, a commune in the Somme department in northern France
- Mesnil-Clinchamps, a commune in the Calvados department in northwestern France
- Mesnil-Domqueur, a commune in the Somme department in northern France
- Mesnil-en-Arrouaise, a commune in the Somme department in northern France
- Mesnil-Follemprise, a commune in the Seine-Maritime department in northern France
- Mesnil-la-Comtesse, a commune in the Aube department in north-central France
- Mesnil-Lettre, a commune in the Aube department in north-central France
- Mesnil-Martinsart, a commune in the Somme department in northern France
- Mesnil-Mauger, a commune in the Seine-Maritime department in northern France
- Mesnil-Panneville, a commune in the Seine-Maritime department in northern France
- Mesnil-Raoul, a commune in the Seine-Maritime department in northern France
- Mesnil-Rousset, a commune in the Eure department in northern France
- Mesnil-Saint-Georges, a commune in the Somme department in northern France
- Mesnil-Saint-Laurent, a commune in the Aisne department in northern France
- Mesnil-Saint-Loup, a commune in the Aube department in north-central France
- Mesnil-Saint-Nicaise, a commune in the Somme department in northern France
- Mesnil-Saint-Père, a commune in the Aube department in north-central France
- Mesnil-Sellières, a commune in the Aube department in north-central France
- Mesnil-sous-Vienne, a commune in the Eure department in northern France
- Mesnil-sur-l'Estrée, a commune in the Eure department in northern France
- Mesnil-Verclives, a commune in the Eure department in northern France
- Blanc-Mesnil, a former commune in the Seine-Maritime department in northwestern France, now part of Sainte-Marguerite-sur-Mer
- Bosc-Mesnil, a commune in the Seine-Maritime department in northern France
- Dom-le-Mesnil, a commune in the Ardennes department in northern France
- Graignes-Mesnil-Angot, a commune in the Manche department in north-western France
- Grébault-Mesnil, a commune in the Somme department in northern France
- Le Blanc-Mesnil, a commune in the northeastern suburbs of Paris, France
- Le Torp-Mesnil, a commune in the Seine-Maritime department in northern France
- Minaucourt-le-Mesnil-lès-Hurlus, a commune in the Marne department in north-eastern France
- Nagel-Séez-Mesnil, a commune in the Eure department in northern France
- Neuf-Mesnil, a commune in the Nord department in northern France
- Petit-Mesnil, a commune in the Aube department in north-central France
- Saint-Georges-du-Mesnil, a commune in the Eure department in northern France
- Saint-Martin-du-Mesnil-Oury, a commune in the Calvados department in northwestern France
- Saint-Ouen-du-Mesnil-Oger, a commune in the Calvados department in northwestern France
- Saint-Pierre-du-Mesnil, a commune in the Eure department in northern France
- Vieux-Mesnil, a commune in the Nord department in northern France

=== Other ===
- Château de Mesnil-Voisin, a French castle located at the heart of the hamlet of "Mesnil-Voisin" in the commune of Bouray-sur-Juine in the department of Essonne

== People ==
- Mesnil (surname)

== See also ==
- Grandmesnil (disambiguation)
- Le Mesnil (disambiguation)
- Dumesnil
