= Livarot =

Commune in Calvados, France

- Part of Livarot-Pays-d'Auge
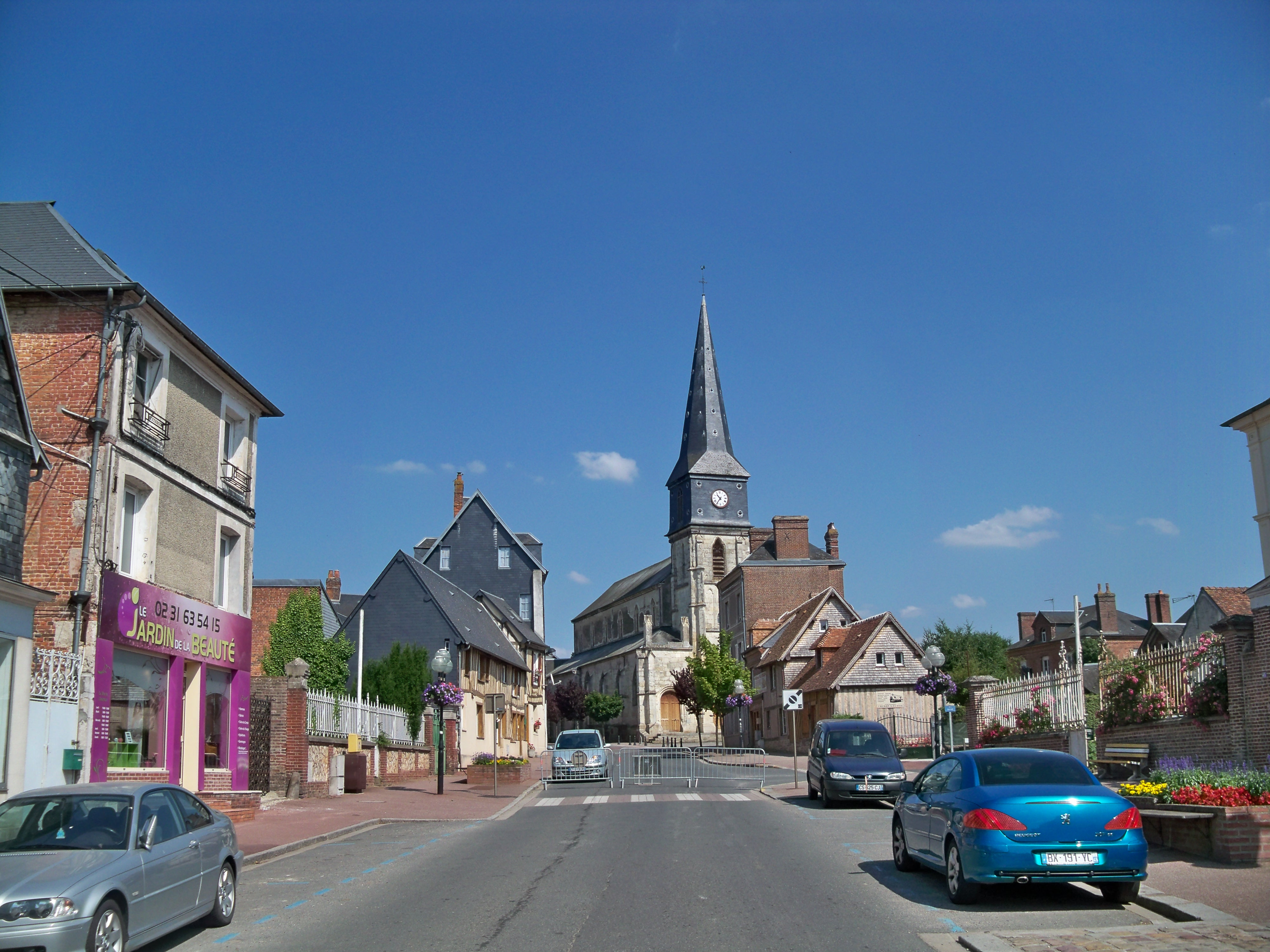
- The church in Livarot

- Coat of arms
- Location of Livarot
- Location within France Location within Normandy
- Coordinates: 49°00′27″N 0°09′12″E
- Country: France
- Region: Normandy
- Department: Calvados
- Arrondissement: Lisieux
- Canton: Livarot-Pays-d'Auge
- Commune: Livarot-Pays-d'Auge
- Area^{1}: 12.09 km^{2} (4.67 sq mi)
- Elevation: 64 m (210 ft)
- Highest elevation: 184 m (604 ft)
- Lowest elevation: 52 m (171 ft)
- Population (2022): 2,045
  - Density: 169.1/km^{2} (438.1/sq mi)
- Time zone: UTC+01:00 (CET)
  - Summer (DST): UTC+02:00 (CEST)
- Postal code: 14140
- ^{1} French Land Register data, which excludes lakes, ponds, glaciers > 1 km^{2} (0.386 sq mi or 247 acres) and river estuaries.

Livarot (French pronunciation: [livaʁo]) is a former commune in the Calvados department in the Normandy region in northwestern France. On 1 January 2016, it was merged into the new commune of Livarot-Pays-d'Auge.

The population is 2,045 inhabitants (in 2022) and the name of its inhabitants is Livarotais.

The town is home to many companies of renown such as the Georges Leroy factory, Graindorge cheese manufacturing which produces Livarot, among others. The commune gave its name to its cheese; Livarot cheese. The La Fermière (CCLF) calvados cider is also produced in the commune.

== Geography ==
Livarot is situated at the junction of the D4 and D579 roads. The nearest city is Caen, approximately 30 kilometres (19 mi) to the north-west.

== Toponymy ==
The place is attested late in the form Livarrot in 1155, and Livar(r)ou in 1156 or 1157.

The etymological explanation of this place name has no unanimity among toponymists:

- Albert Dauzat and Charles Rostaing, based on a false attestation of Livaron from 1137 (form and date wrong), described it as "obscure", while evoking a derivision of ivos, an assumed Gallic word designating if, and declaring it unlikely. They perhaps resume in these previous assumptions. In reality, the term *ivos or *īvos is not attested and should include an asterisk.
- Ernest Nègre, reasoning from this same erroneous form, considered that it might be from the Germanic name Liubwar, which is followed by the suffix -o /-onem and that the final would be modified by attraction of names in -ot. However, François de Beaurepaire notes that a Germanic name is never used with this suffix.
- Dominique Fournier refuted Livaron (cacography attributed to Albert Dauzat, and badly dated) and based it on the actual form Livar(r)ou, stemming from the Chronicle of Robert of Torigni, to advance the hypothesis of a Gallo-Roman person named Libarius followed by the suffix of Gallic origin -avo which explains most of the words ending in -ou of Normandy.

== History ==
=== Battle of Normandy ===
On 17 July 1944, the pharmacist and Mayor of Livarot brought first aid to Rommel following the strafing of his car by an Allied aircraft, not far away, between the villages of Sainte-Foy-de-Montgommery and Vimoutiers. He was then evacuated, the same day, to the German military hospital in Bernay.

Livarot was liberated on 19 August. Following Operation Paddle, the British 7th Armoured Division was on the banks of the Vie. The division then faced a strong resistance by the 272nd Division of the German infantry, but also suffered losses to friendly fire from Allied aircraft. On 19 August, British artillery heavily bombed the area. The British arrived to seize a bridge, which hadn't been destroyed, across the river to Saint-Michel-de-Livet, north of Livarot. The French Resistance then learned that the Germans had abandoned Livarot and that the first British soldiers had entered the same day.

== Heraldry ==
Arms of Livarot	Of Azure on a chief party at 1. Lozenges argent and gules and 2. Bendlet gules and or with a crosier of or over all, to an escutcheon of argent with lion of gules crowned or and over the crosier, between two fleurs-de-lis also of or.

== Politics and administration ==
List of mayors
Start	End	Name	Party	Other details
1850		Alfred de Neuville		
1919	1938	Georges Bisson		Cheese maker
September 1998	March 2008	Jeannine Louis		School principal
March 2008	2016	Sébastien Leclerc	UMP	Managing director, general counsel

The municipal council is composed of 23 members, including the mayor and six assistants.

== Demographics ==
Historical population

Year	Pop.	±% p.a.
1793	1,033	—
1800	996	−0.52%
1806	1,066	+1.14%
1821	662	−3.13%
1831	1,162	+5.79%
1836	1,215	+0.90%
1841	1,291	+1.22%
1846	1,376	+1.28%
1851	1,464	+1.25%
1856	1,576	+1.49%
1861	1,386	−2.54%
1866	1,499	+1.58%

Year	Pop.	±% p.a.
1872	1,557	+0.63%
1876	1,761	+3.13%
1881	1,842	+0.90%
1886	1,823	−0.21%
1891	1,851	+0.31%
1896	1,763	−0.97%
1901	1,813	+0.56%
1906	2,080	+2.79%
1911	2,281	+1.86%
1921	2,266	−0.07%
1926	2,147	−1.07%
1931	2,193	+0.42%

Year	Pop.	±% p.a.
1936	2,255	+0.56%
1946	2,434	+0.77%
1954	2,391	−0.22%
1962	2,494	+0.53%
1969	2,535	+0.23%
1975	2,654	+0.77%
1982	2,538	−0.64%
1990	2,469	−0.34%
1999	2,516	+0.21%
2007	2,333	−0.94%
2012	2,183	−1.32%
2022	2,045	−0.65%

From 1962 to 1999: Population without double counting; for the years following: municipal population.
Source: EHESS and INSEE

== Economy ==
- Livarot cheese

== Places and monuments ==
- Former Leroy factory (1841), included in the title of the historic monuments.
- The Church of Saint-Ouen from the 15th century, and very reworked. The gallery of the 19th century organ is classified as an historic monument object.
- The old Bisson cheesemakery (1902), converted into a Museum of the workshops of iron art.
- The L'Isle Manor (1912), former property of the Bisson.
- The Graindorge cheesmakery, burned in 1999 and rebuilt in 2001.
- Vestiges of an ancient castle which was owned by Charles the Bad, King of Navarre.
- The menhir of the Pierre Tournante.
Places and monuments in Livarot

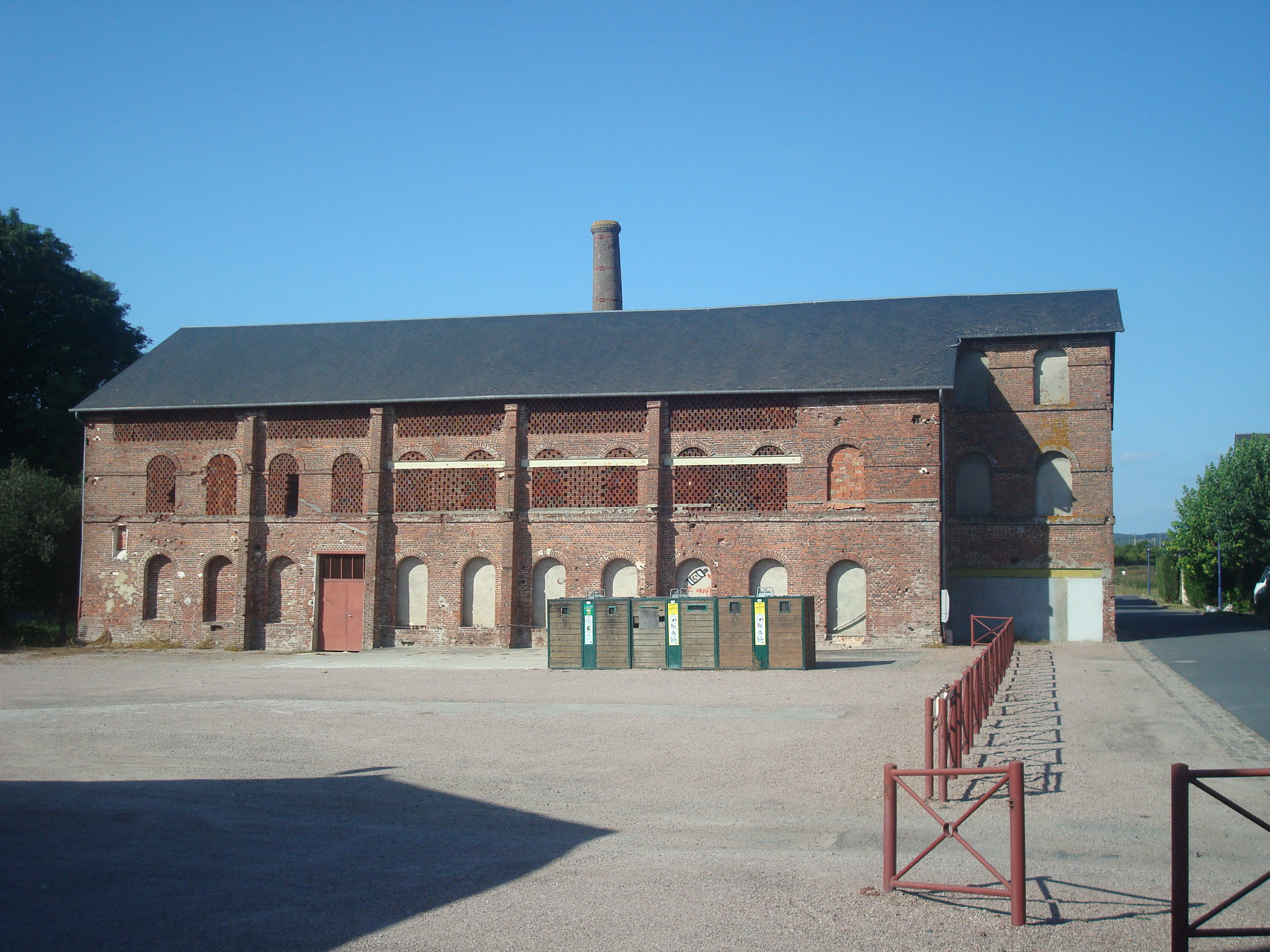
The Leroy factory

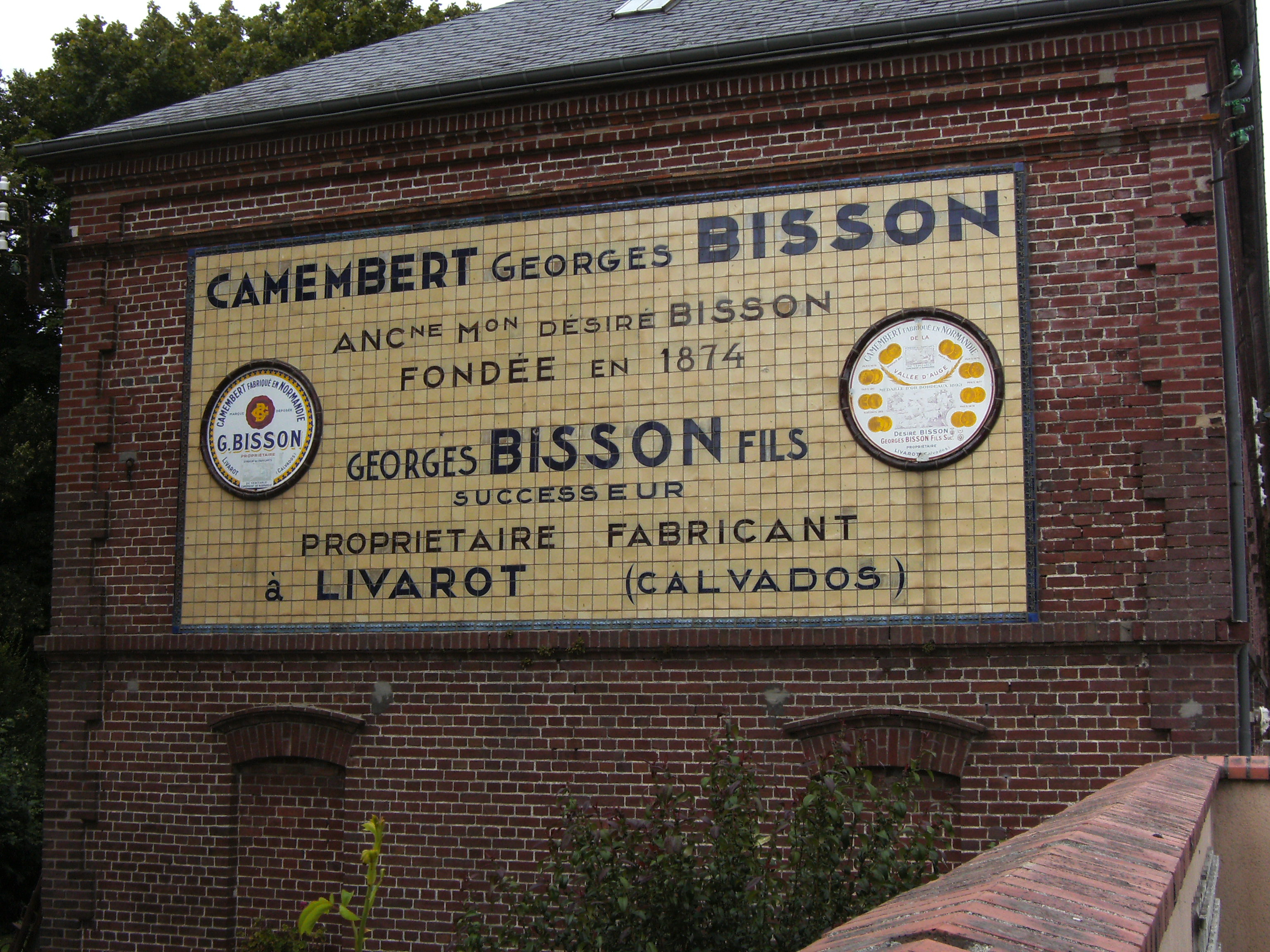
The old Bisson cheesmakery

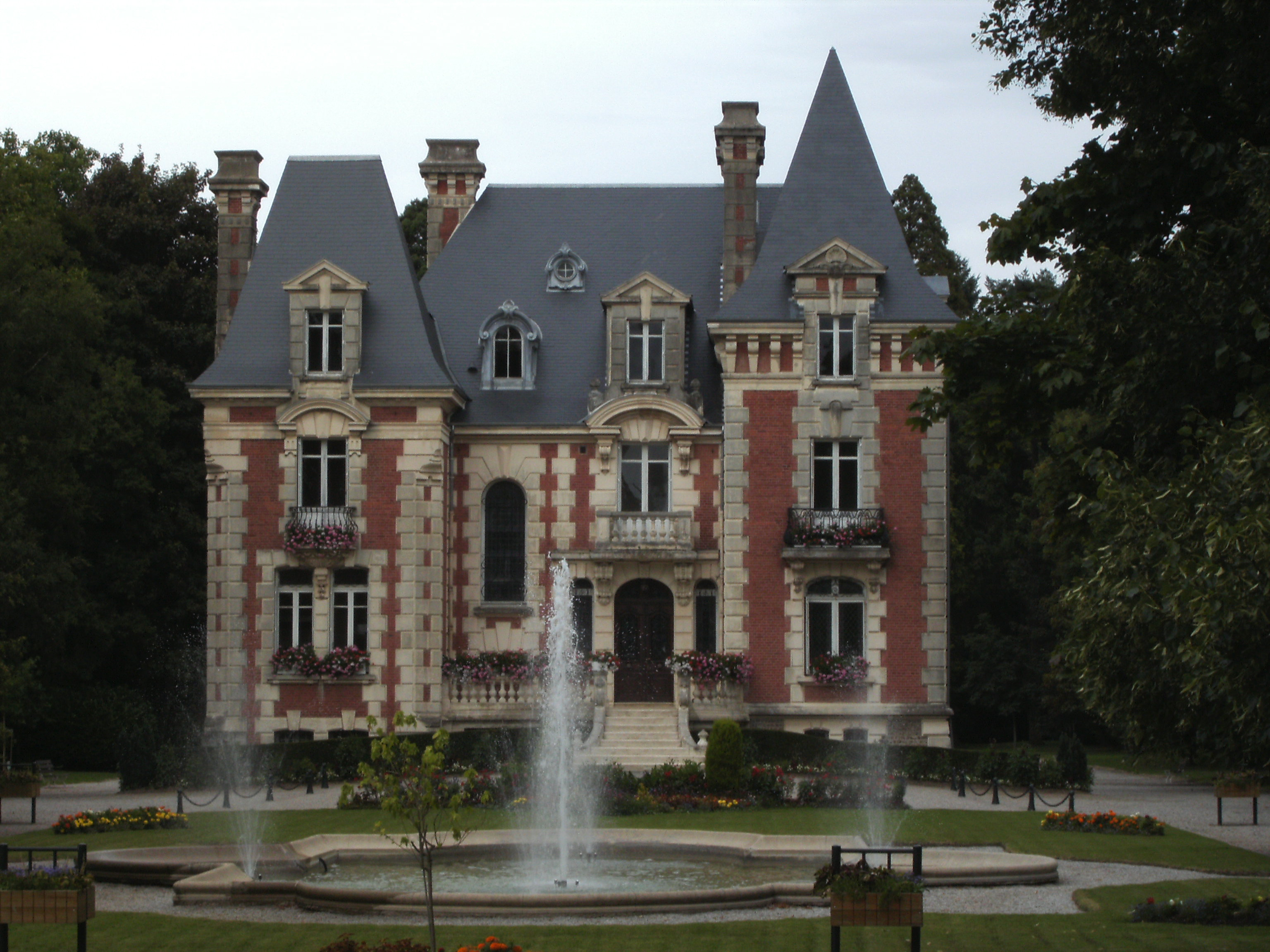
Le manor of l'Isle

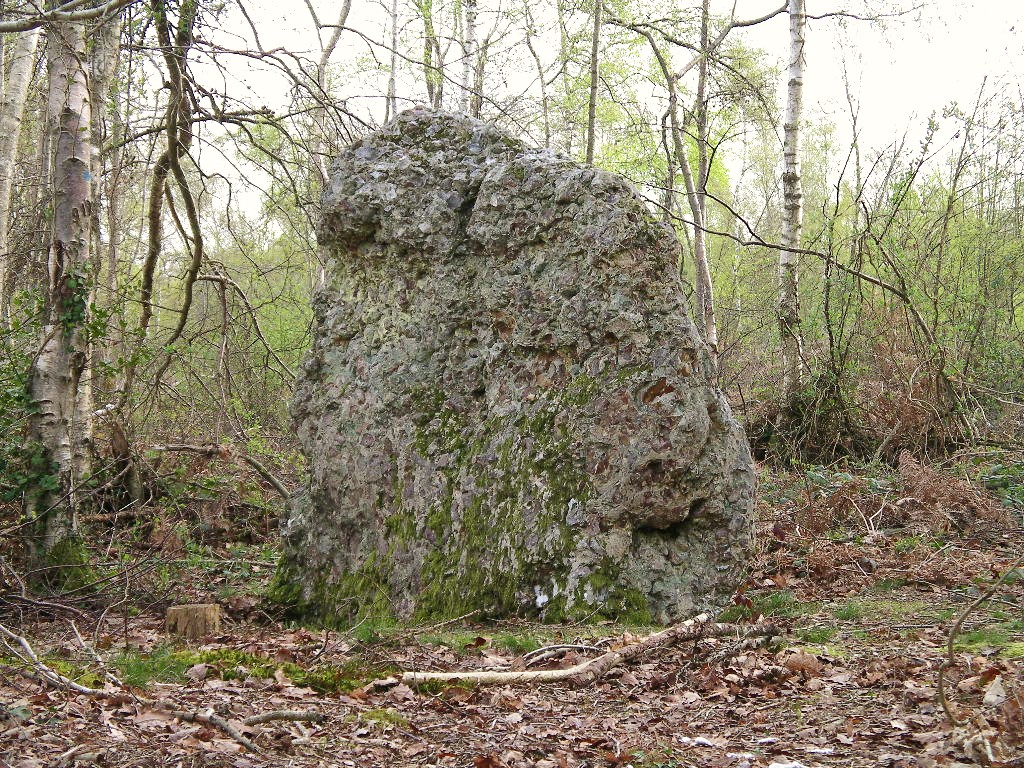
The Pierre Tournante

== Activity and events ==
=== Twinning ===
- South Molton, United Kingdom since 1975

=== Sports ===
The Étoile Sportive Livarotaise [Livarotaise Sports Star] evolved two football teams in district divisions.

The cycling section of the club has trained many riders such as father and son François and Romain Lemarchand, and also Fabien Taillefer. Stage 7 of the 2015 Tour de France is also planned to start in Livarot.

=== Events ===
The Livarot Cheese Fair is held every year in August.

== Personalities linked to the commune ==
- Charles II of Navarre (1332-1387), King of Navarre and count of Évreux, owner of the old Castle.
- Jacques Dufresne (1732 to Livarot - 1832), parish priest of Le Mesnil-Durand, Deputy of the clergy.
- Alfred Rioult de Neuville (1802 Livarot - Livarot, 1894), politician.
- Joël Le Bigot (born in 1946 in Livarot), Quebec radio host.
- François Lemarchand (born in 1960 in Livarot), cyclist.

== See also ==
- Communes of the Calvados department
