= Robert Halley (politician) =

French politician and businessman (1935–2021)

General Councillor of the Canton of Livarot
- In office 1991–2004

Mayor of Les Moutiers-Hubert
- In office 1978–2001

Personal details
- Born: 20 October 1935 Cherbourg, France
- Died: 10 January 2021 (aged 85) Lisieux, France

Robert Halley (20 October 1935 – 10 January 2021) was a French politician and businessman.

== Biography ==
In 1961, Halley, his father Paul-Auguste, and his brother Paul-Louis founded the retail group Promodès, where he spent his entire career.

After the accidental death of his brother in 2003 Halley became his family's sole representative on Carrefour's management board. In 2007, after Colony Capital and the Groupe Arnault acquired a stake in Carrefour, he replaced Luc Vandevelde as head of the supervisory board. The shareholders' agreement was modified in April 2008, and he lost his position as first shareholder and his seat on the supervisory board, when Bernard Arnault took over. In 2009, according to Challenges, he was the 11th richest French man, with a net worth of 2.769 billion euros.

From 1978 to 2001, Halley served as Mayor of Les Moutiers-Hubert. He oversaw the decision to sell the town hall to finance the burial of electricity networks. He also served as the General Councillor of the Canton of Livarot from 1991 to 2004.

Halley died in Lisieux on 10 January 2021 at the age of 85.
