= Les Autels-Saint-Bazile =

- Part of Livarot-Pays-d'Auge
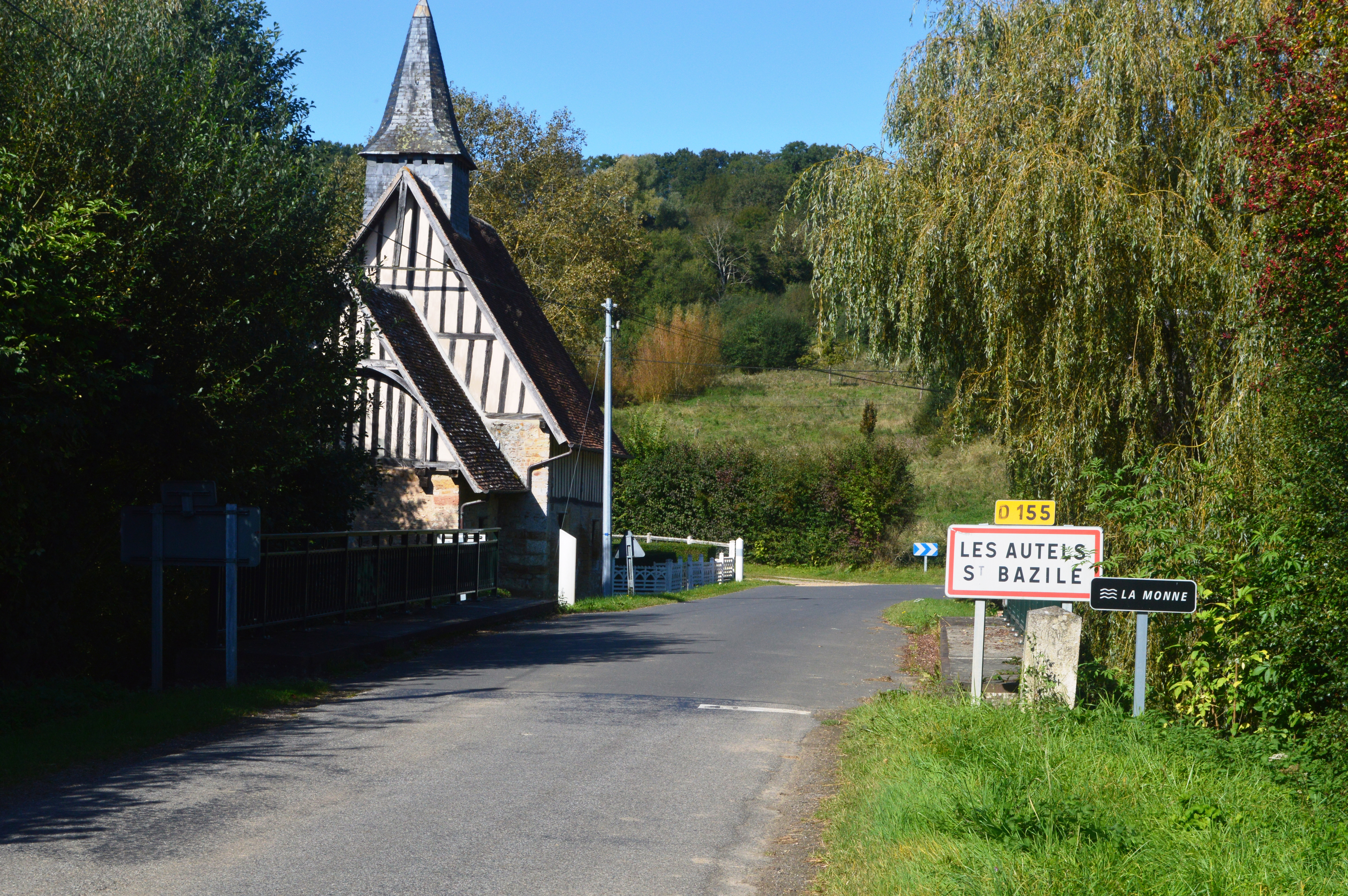
- Location of Les Autels-Saint-Bazile
- Location within France Location within Normandy
- Coordinates: 48°56′29″N 0°05′02″E
- Country: France
- Region: Normandy
- Department: Calvados
- Arrondissement: Lisieux
- Canton: Livarot-Pays-d'Auge
- Commune: Livarot-Pays-d'Auge
- Area^{1}: 5.53 km^{2} (2.14 sq mi)
- Highest elevation: 226 m (741 ft)
- Lowest elevation: 81 m (266 ft)
- Population (2023): 49
  - Density: 8.9/km^{2} (23/sq mi)
- Time zone: UTC+01:00 (CET)
  - Summer (DST): UTC+02:00 (CEST)
- Postal code: 14140
- ^{1} French Land Register data, which excludes lakes, ponds, glaciers > 1 km^{2} (0.386 sq mi or 247 acres) and river estuaries.

Les Autels-Saint-Bazile (French pronunciation: [le.z‿otɛl sɛ̃ bazil]) is a former commune in the Calvados department in the Normandy region of north-western France. On 1 January 2016, it was merged into the new commune of Livarot-Pays-d'Auge.

== Geography ==
Les Autels-Saint-Bazile is located some 45 km south-east of Caen and 28 km south-west of Lisieux. The eastern and southern border of the commune is the departmental border between Calvados and Orne. Access to the commune is by the D38 road from Heurtevent in the north which forms part of the northern border before crossing the commune and passing through the village continuing to the south. The D155 comes from the north and passes down the north-eastern side of the commune before continuing south to Le Renouard. The D38A goes east from the village to connect with the D155. The D111 also passes south through the western extension of the commune. The commune is mixed forest and farmland.

The Monne river forms the eastern border of the commune as it flows north-east to join the Vie north of La Brévière. An unnamed stream rises in the centre of the commune and flows east to join the Monne. The Aubette forms the western border of the western extension of the commune. The Ruisseau de Clermont rises in the west of the commune and flows north to join the Aubette.

== Administration ==
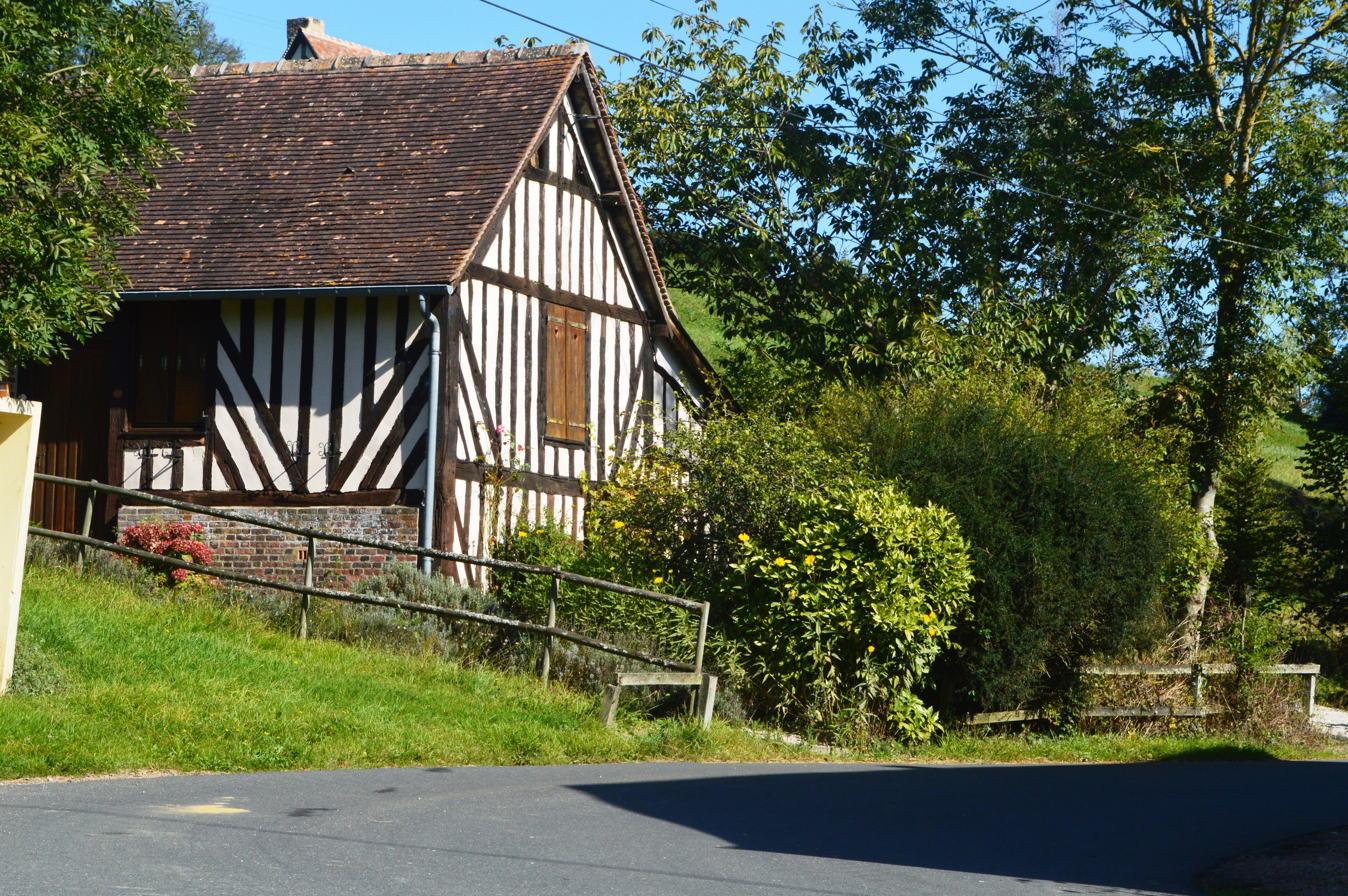
An old house in Les Autels-Saint-Bazile

List of Successive Mayors

From	To	Name
1922	1924	Firmin Lemarchand
1959	2001	Bernard Lemarchand
2001	2016	Xavier Lemarchand

== Demography ==
Historical population

Year	Pop.	±% p.a.
1793	75	—
1800	59	−3.37%
1806	70	+2.89%
1821	81	+0.98%
1831	86	+0.60%
1836	178	+15.66%
1841	188	+1.10%
1846	184	−0.43%
1851	171	−1.45%
1856	155	−1.95%
1861	164	+1.14%
1866	165	+0.12%
1872	151	−1.47%
1876	179	+4.34%
1881	170	−1.03%
1886	173	+0.35%
1891	161	−1.43%
1896	144	−2.21%

Year	Pop.	±% p.a.
1901	157	+1.74%
1906	140	−2.27%
1911	139	−0.14%
1921	119	−1.54%
1926	118	−0.17%
1931	124	+1.00%
1936	113	−1.84%
1946	142	+2.31%
1954	113	−2.82%
1962	105	−0.91%
1968	95	−1.65%
1975	72	−3.88%
1982	63	−1.89%
1990	52	−2.37%
1999	51	−0.22%
2007	46	−1.28%
2012	49	+1.27%
2023	49	+0.00%

Figures of 1831 and earlier are for Saint-Bazile, before the merger with Les Autels-en-Auge.
Source: EHESS and INSEE

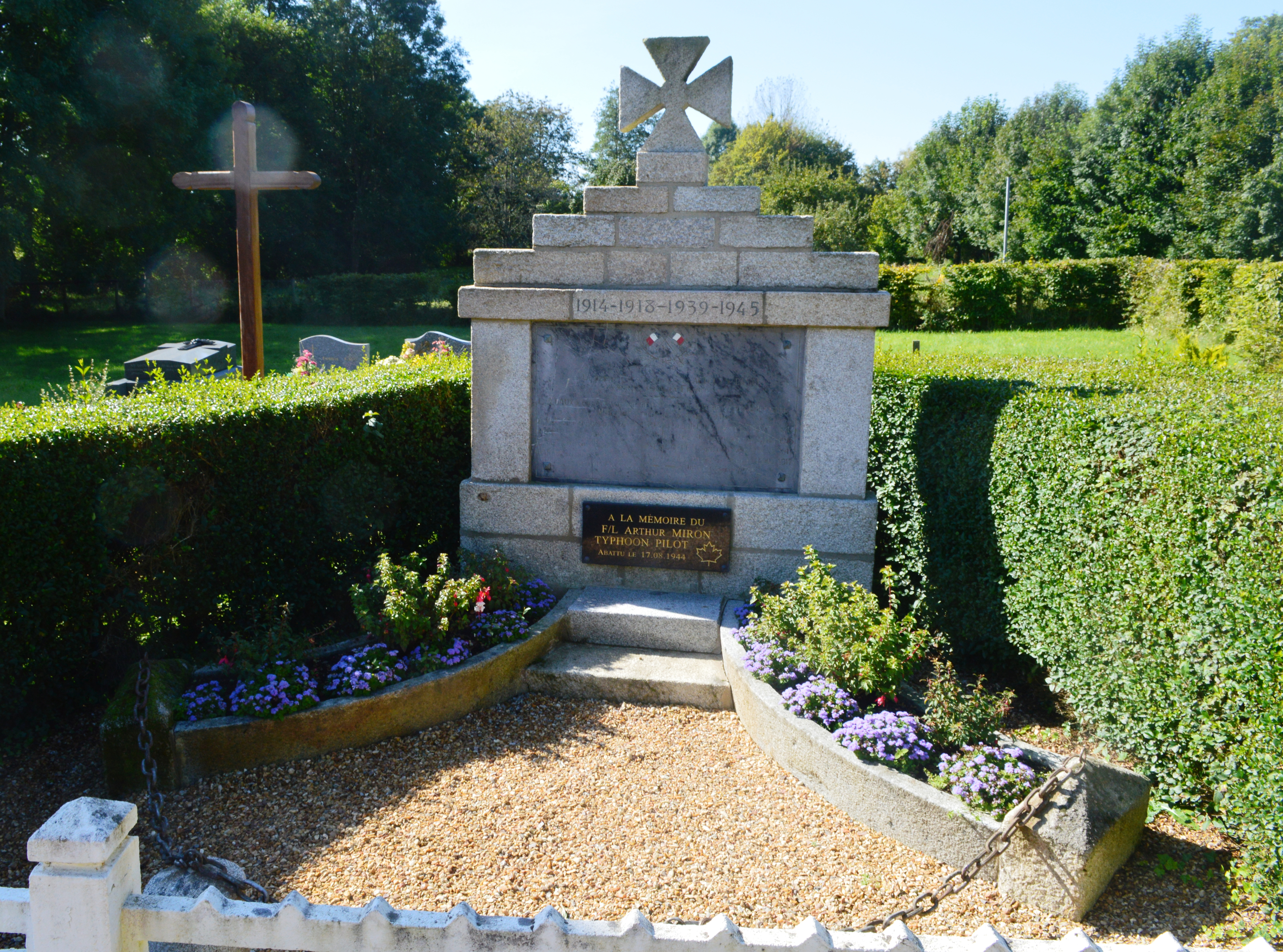
Les Autels-Saint-Bazile War Memorial

== Culture and heritage ==
=== Religious heritage ===
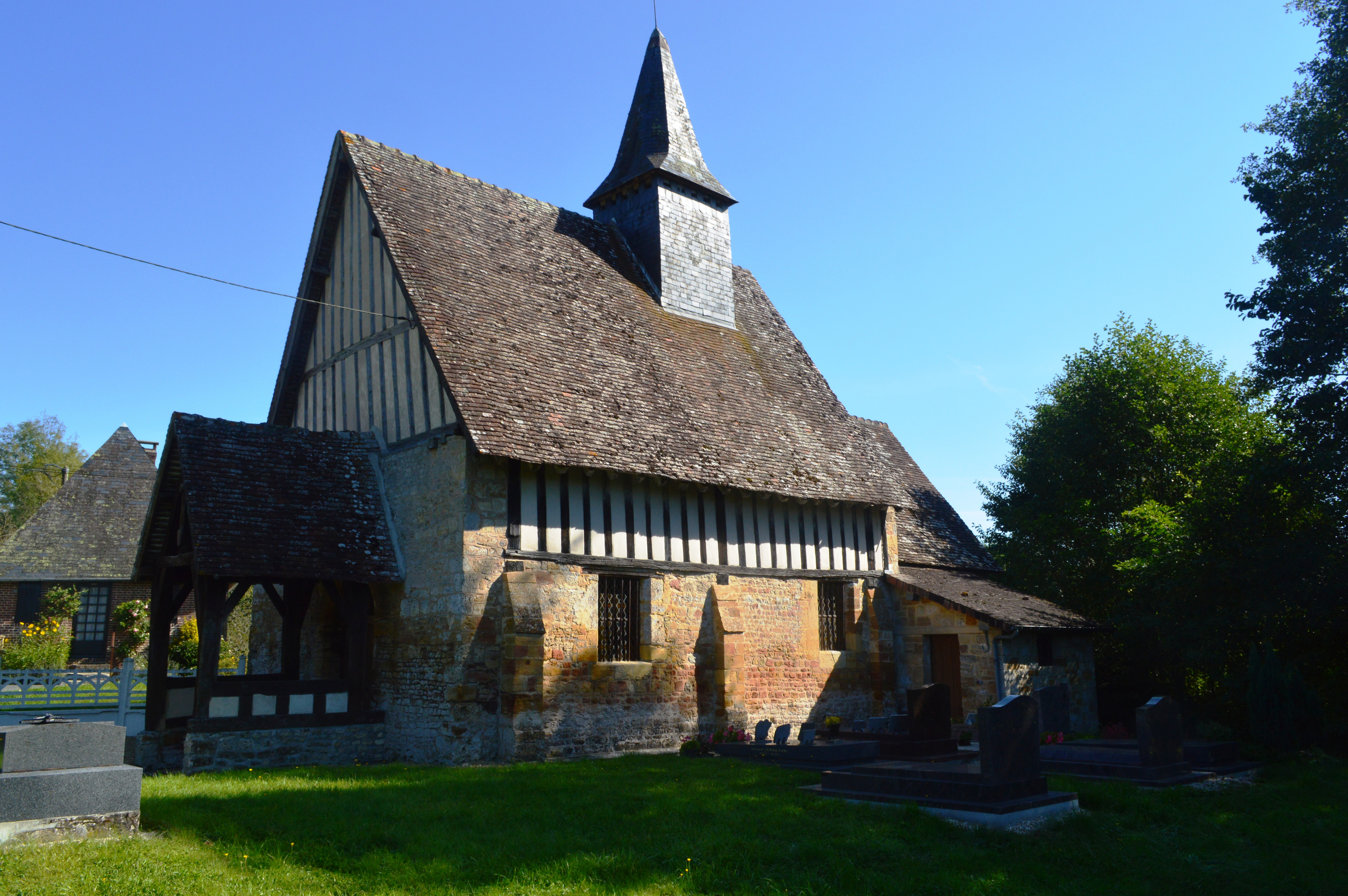
The Church of Saint Basile

The Parish Church of Saint Basile contains two items that are registered as historical objects:

- A Consecrated water bowl with water-sprinkler (17th century)
- A Statue: Virgin and child (15th century)

== See also ==
- Communes of the Calvados department
