= Pierre-Louis-Georges du Buat =

French hydraulic engineer

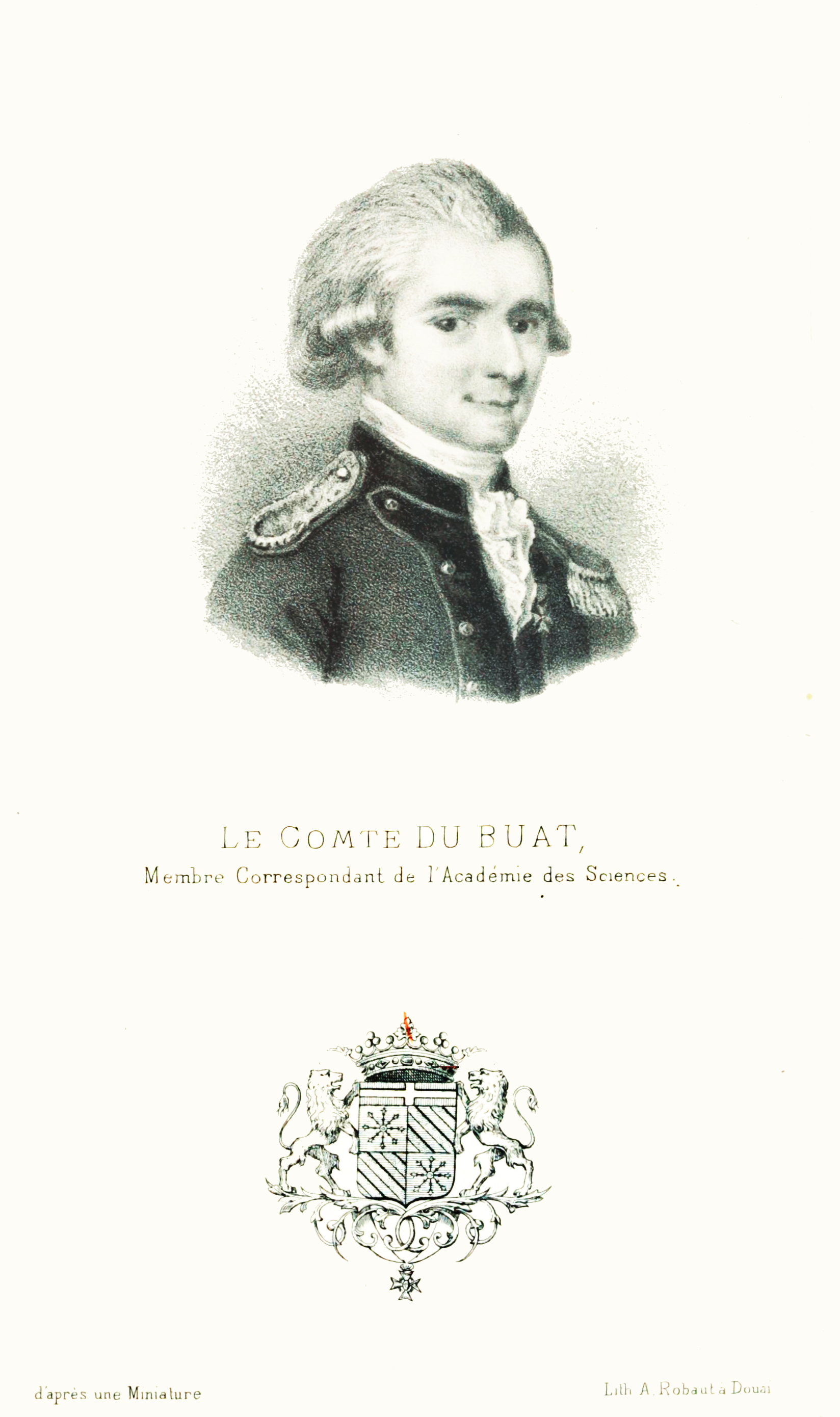

Count Pierre-Louis-George du Buat (23 April 1734 – 17 October 1809) was a French military engineer who worked on problems in hydraulics and hydrodynamics. He examined the flow of water and came up with a mathematical formulation defining the rate of flow of water through pipes which he published in Principes d’hydraulique, vérifiés par un grand nombre d’expériences faites par ordre du gouvernement.

== Early life and engineering ==
Du Buat came from a noble family and was born in a manor at Buttenval, Tortisambert in Normandy. He was educated at the Royal School of Engineering in Mézières in 1750 and became a military engineer at the age of 17. He began his first work in the construction of canals of the Lys and the Aa. He became a chief engineer in 1773.

== Water velocity studies ==
In 1786 he established through experiments a relationship between the velocity of flow of water through a pipe of a known radius and inclination which he extended then to flow in open canals.

$u = 2 i m g \left ( \frac{lh}{l+2h} \right )$

u is the average water velocity,
g is the acceleration of gravity,
m is a coefficient depending on the roughness of the banks,
i is the slope of the channel bottom,
l is the width of the bed,
h the depth of the channel.

Du Buat also studied the dependence of viscosity of liquids on temperature.

== Personal life and business career ==
Du Buat married the daughter of Gérard Bosquet in 1758 which made him a shareholder of the Compagnie des mines d'Anzin. He left the corps of engineers in 1788 and became a director of the company in 1802.
