= Pierre Quantin =

French general

- Born: 19 June 1759; Fervaques, Calvados
- Died: 7 February 1824 (aged 64)
- Allegiance: Kingdom of France; Kingdom of the French; First French Republic; First French Empire
- Branch: French Army
- Service years: Unknown – 1811
- Rank: Général de division
- Conflicts: French Revolutionary Wars; War in the Vendée; Chouannerie; Haitian Revolution; Saint-Domingue expedition
- Awards: Légion d'honneur

Pierre Quantin (born 19 June 1759 in Fervaques, Calvados – died 7 February 1824) was a French general. Quantin attained the rank of general de brigade in July 1796 and was promoted to general de division the next month. He retired in 1811 after service in the French Revolutionary Wars and Napoleonic Wars.

== Life ==
Before the French Revolution he served in the naval artillery, abandoning it for the army artillery. In 1792 he was made captain of the canonniers of the 3rd bataillon du Calvados and rapidly rose through the ranks. In 1795 he had already become a général de division and served under general Gabriel Marie Joseph d'Hédouville, chef d’état-major général of the armée des côtes de Brest, then under general Lazare Hoche in the War in the Vendée. His principles were shared with those two generals - to shed as little French blood as much as possible, to employ persuasion to reconcile hostile figures and to intimidate by examples of severity.

General Quantin left the Véndée in 1797 to take up command of the 9th division at Nîmes. A year later he passed to the 8th division and moved to Aix, the main town in the area. Most citizens abstained from attending the primaries and for some there was a disgust for assisting in these assemblies, which were always live discussions that degenerated into acts of violence, whereas others were indifferent or convinced these elections were useless as the executive could override them at will. General Quantin addressed the subject, in the name of the French Directory, in a proclamation instructing the province's inhabitants to come to all these assemblies and to contribute their votes. Even so, what was done at these meetings continued to seem pointless to the Directory and it annulled electoral operations that same year, despite the most scrupulous observation of its regulatory decisions.

In year 10 (1801–02) he was called to join the Saint-Domingue expedition, commanded by general Charles Victor Emmanuel Leclerc, but returned to France in year 11 (1802–03) after Leclerc's death. He was given the cross of the Légion d'honneur in year 12 (1804) and was made a commander of the order on 14 June 1804. He then held the command of Belle-Île-en-Mer for many years, heading several public works which made that port almost impregnable, but was removed from it in disgrace (though the causes of that disgrace remain unclear). He thus successfully requested to retire in 1811.
