= Préaux-Saint-Sébastien =

- Part of Livarot-Pays-d'Auge
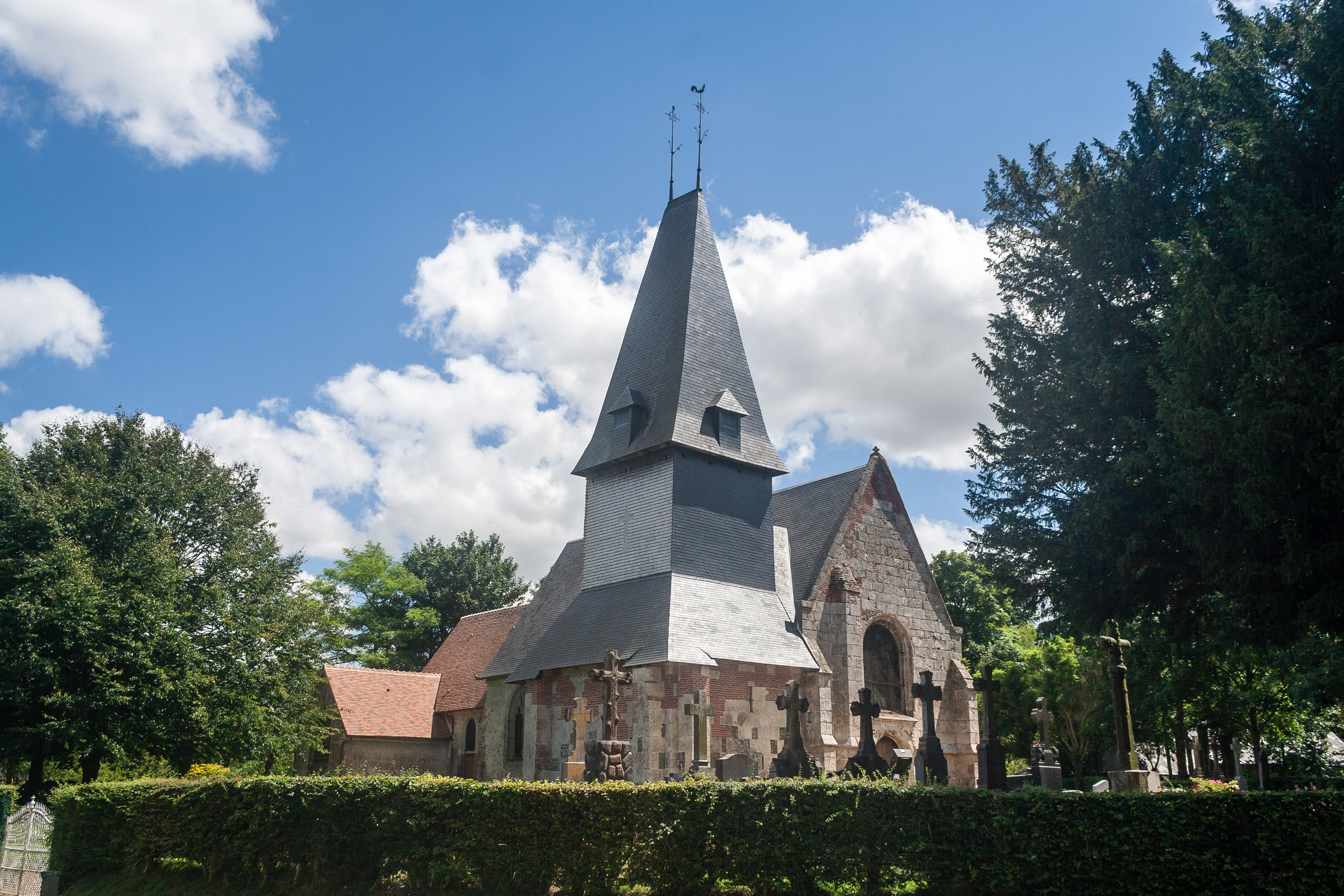

- Coat of arms
- Location of Préaux-Saint-Sébastien
- Location within France Location within Normandy
- Coordinates: 48°59′15″N 0°18′29″E
- Country: France
- Region: Normandy
- Department: Calvados
- Arrondissement: Lisieux
- Canton: Livarot-Pays-d'Auge
- Commune: Livarot-Pays-d'Auge
- Area^{1}: 3.72 km^{2} (1.44 sq mi)
- Elevation: 202 m (663 ft)
- Highest elevation: 215 m (705 ft)
- Lowest elevation: 165 m (541 ft)
- Population (2023): 38
  - Density: 10/km^{2} (26/sq mi)
- Time zone: UTC+01:00 (CET)
  - Summer (DST): UTC+02:00 (CEST)
- Postal code: 14290
- ^{1} French Land Register data, which excludes lakes, ponds, glaciers > 1 km^{2} (0.386 sq mi or 247 acres) and river estuaries.

Préaux-Saint-Sébastien (French pronunciation: [pʁeo sɛ̃ sebastjɛ̃]) is a former commune in the Calvados department in the Normandy region in northwestern France. On 1 January 2016, it was merged into the new commune of Livarot-Pays-d'Auge.

== See also ==
- Communes of the Calvados department
