= Livarot-Pays-d'Auge =

- Commune
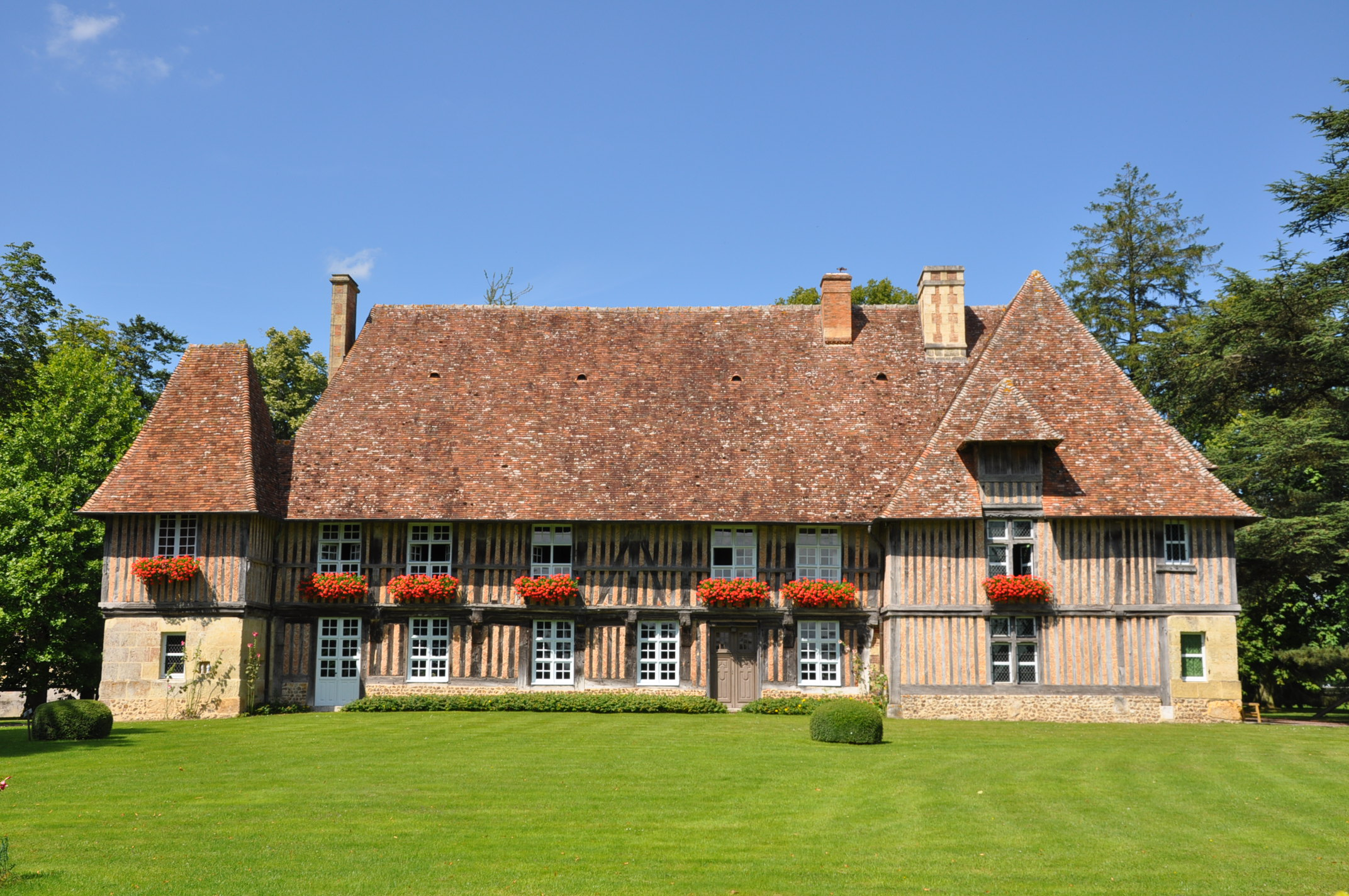
- Bellou Manor
- Location of Livarot-Pays-d'Auge
- Location within France Location within Normandy
- Coordinates: 49°00′18″N 0°09′04″E
- Country: France
- Region: Normandy
- Department: Calvados
- Arrondissement: Lisieux
- Canton: Livarot-Pays-d'Auge
- Intercommunality: CA Lisieux Normandie

Government
  - Mayor (2020–2026): Frédéric Legouverneur
- Area^{1}: 180.83 km^{2} (69.82 sq mi)
- Population (2023): 6,207
  - Density: 34.33/km^{2} (88.90/sq mi)
- Time zone: UTC+01:00 (CET)
  - Summer (DST): UTC+02:00 (CEST)
- INSEE/Postal code: 14371 /14140, 14290
- ^{1} French Land Register data, which excludes lakes, ponds, glaciers > 1 km^{2} (0.386 sq mi or 247 acres) and river estuaries.

Livarot-Pays-d'Auge (French pronunciation: [livaʁo pei doʒ], literally Livarot Land of Auge) is a commune in the department of Calvados, northwestern France. The municipality was established on 1 January 2016 by merger of the 22 former communes of Livarot (the seat), Auquainville, Les Autels-Saint-Bazile, Bellou, Cerqueux, Cheffreville-Tonnencourt, La Croupte, Familly, Fervaques, Heurtevent, Le Mesnil-Bacley, Le Mesnil-Durand, Le Mesnil-Germain, Meulles, Les Moutiers-Hubert, Notre-Dame-de-Courson, Préaux-Saint-Sébastien, Sainte-Marguerite-des-Loges, Saint-Martin-du-Mesnil-Oury, Saint-Michel-de-Livet, Saint-Ouen-le-Houx and Tortisambert.

== Geography ==
The commune along with another 11 communes shares part of a 1,400 hectare, Natura 2000 conservation area, called the Haute Vallée de la Touques et affluents.

== Population ==
Population data refer to the commune in its geography as of January 2025.

Historical population
Year	Pop.	±% p.a.
1968	6,826	—
1975	6,405	−0.91%
1982	6,212	−0.44%
1990	6,252	+0.08%
1999	6,276	+0.04%
2007	6,608	+0.65%
2012	6,646	+0.11%
2017	6,323	−0.99%
2023	6,207	−0.31%
Source: INSEE

== See also ==
- Communes of the Calvados department
