= Dumesny =

Dumesny is a surname. Notable people with the name include:

- Max Dumesny (born 1959), Australian Sprintcar driver
- Louis Gaulard Dumesny (fl. 1677–1702), French operatic tenor
- Pierre Joseph Michel Salomon Dumesny (1739–1803), French general during the Battle of Hondschoote (1793)

== See also ==
- Dumesnil (disambiguation)
