= Bellou =

- Part of Livarot-Pays-d'Auge
- Location of Bellou
- Location within France Location within Normandy
- Coordinates: 48°58′59″N 0°13′44″E
- Country: France
- Region: Normandy
- Department: Calvados
- Arrondissement: Lisieux
- Canton: Livarot-Pays-d'Auge
- Commune: Livarot-Pays-d'Auge
- Area^{1}: 7.39 km^{2} (2.85 sq mi)
- Elevation: 190 m (620 ft)
- Highest elevation: 204 m (669 ft)
- Lowest elevation: 128 m (420 ft)
- Population (2023): 146
  - Density: 19.8/km^{2} (51.2/sq mi)
- Time zone: UTC+01:00 (CET)
  - Summer (DST): UTC+02:00 (CEST)
- Postal code: 14140
- ^{1} French Land Register data, which excludes lakes, ponds, glaciers > 1 km^{2} (0.386 sq mi or 247 acres) and river estuaries.

Bellou (French pronunciation: [bɛlu]) is a former commune in the Calvados département in the Normandy region in northwestern France. On 1 January 2016, it was merged into the new commune of Livarot-Pays-d'Auge. It is situated 18 kilometres from Lisieux, in the Pays d'Auge.

== Monuments ==
The Manoir de Bellou, built in 1720, and its 16th-century dovecote, have been registered as a monument historique by the French Ministry of Culture since 1923. Its cider press building with its machinery and cellar were added to the register in 2004.

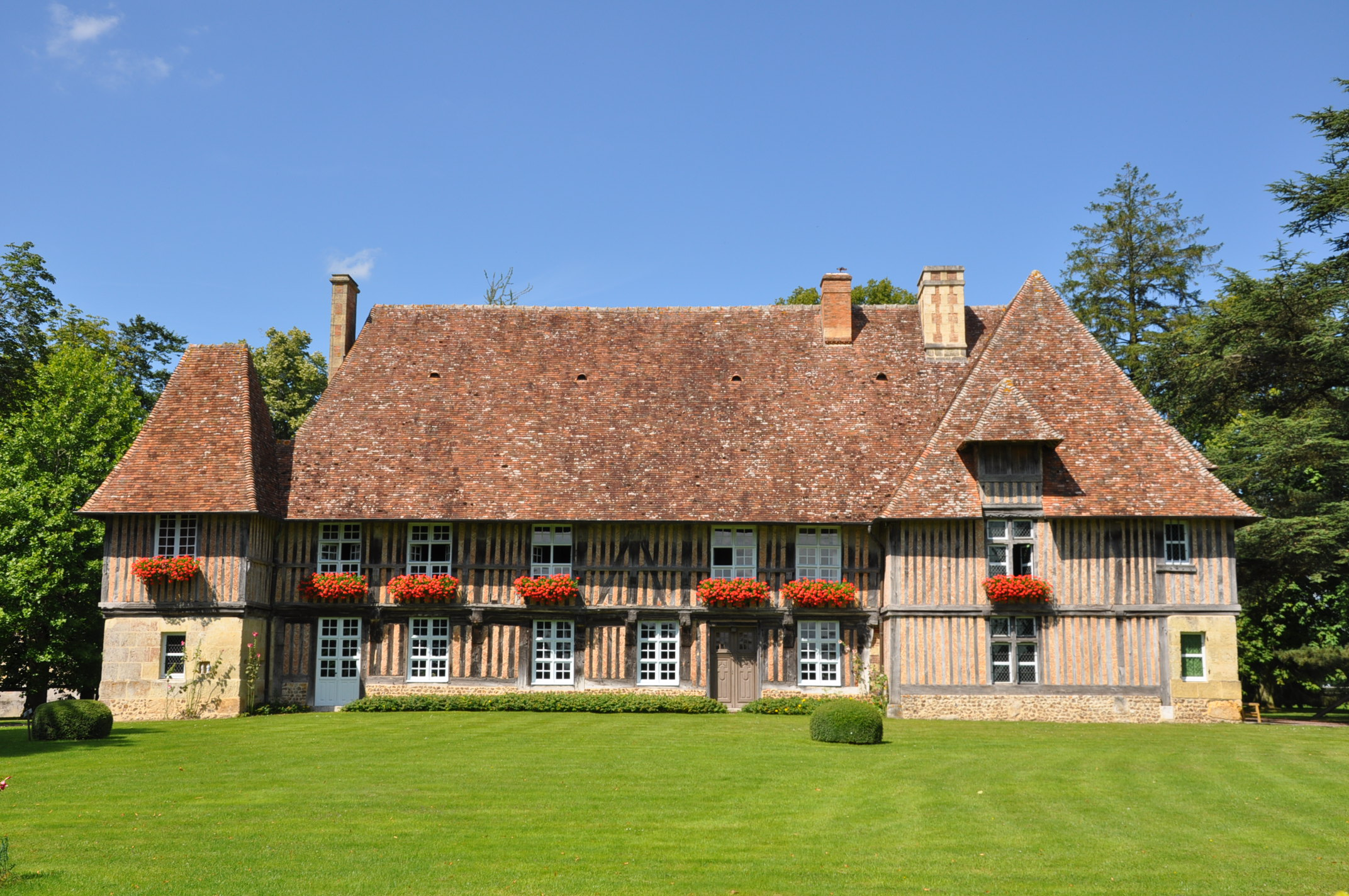
Manoir de Bellou

== People linked to the commune ==
- Rose Harel, poet and goguettère, was born here on 8 April 1826. She died in Lisieux on 4 July 1885.

== See also ==
- Communes of the Calvados department
