= Saint-Ouen-le-Houx =

Part of Livarot-Pays-d'Auge, Normandy, France

- Part of Livarot-Pays-d'Auge
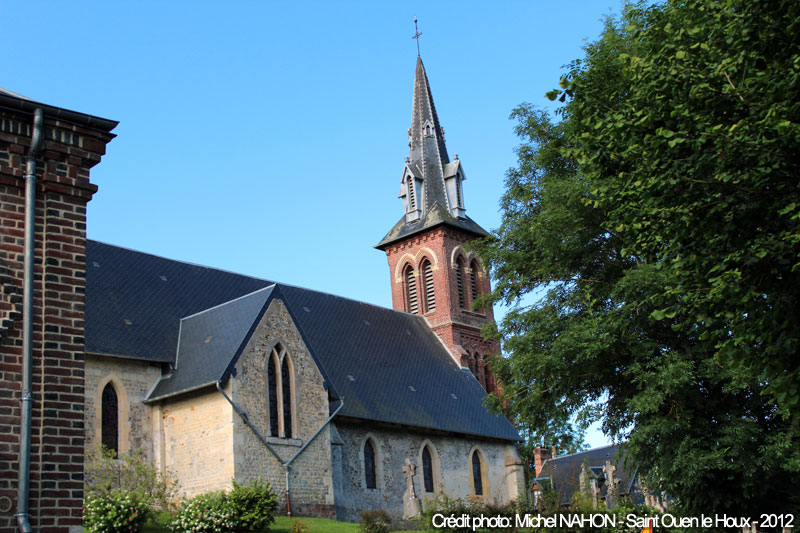
- Location of Saint-Ouen-le-Houx
- Location within France Location within Normandy
- Coordinates: 48°58′43″N 0°11′06″E
- Country: France
- Region: Normandy
- Department: Calvados
- Arrondissement: Lisieux
- Canton: Livarot-Pays-d'Auge
- Commune: Livarot-Pays-d'Auge
- Area^{1}: 5.21 km^{2} (2.01 sq mi)
- Elevation: 200 m (660 ft)
- Highest elevation: 189 m (620 ft)
- Lowest elevation: 99 m (325 ft)
- Population (2023): 90
  - Density: 17/km^{2} (45/sq mi)
- Time zone: UTC+01:00 (CET)
  - Summer (DST): UTC+02:00 (CEST)
- Postal code: 14140
- ^{1} French Land Register data, which excludes lakes, ponds, glaciers > 1 km^{2} (0.386 sq mi or 247 acres) and river estuaries.

Saint-Ouen-le-Houx (French pronunciation: [sɛ̃.t‿wɛ̃ lə u]) is a former commune in the Calvados department in the Normandy region in northwestern France. On 1 January 2016, it was merged into the new commune of Livarot-Pays-d'Auge.

== See also ==
- Communes of the Calvados department
