= François Lemarchand =

French cyclist

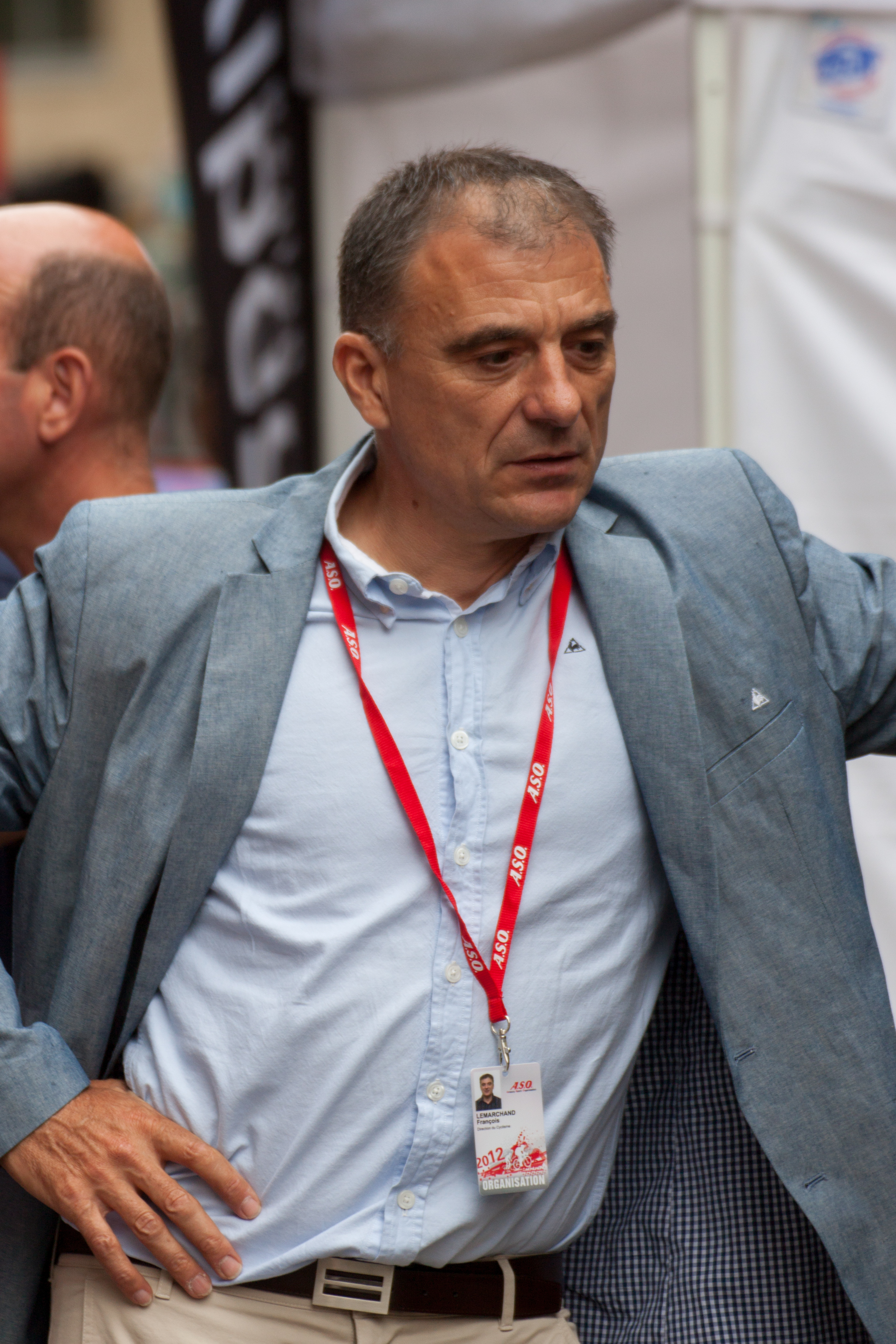
- Lemarchand at the 2012 Critérium du Dauphiné

Personal information
- Born: 2 November 1960 (age 65) Livarot, France

Cycling career
- Sport: Cycling
- Discipline: Road
- Role: Rider
- Rider type: All-rounder

Professional teams
- 1985–1988: Fagor
- 1989-1992: Z-Peugeot
- 1993-1997: Gan

François Lemarchand (born 2 November 1960 in Livarot, France) is a former French cyclist, who during the 1980s and 1990s participated in ten Tours de France. He was a professional cyclist between 1985 and 1997.
