= Grandmesnil =

Grandmesnil or Grandménil may refer to:

== People ==
- Grandmesnil family, aristocratic family in Normandy in the 11th to 13th centuries, including:
  - Hugh de Grandmesnil, lord of Grandmesnil, sheriff of Leicestershire
  - Robert de Grandmesnil, Hugh's younger brother
  - Ivo de Grandmesnil, Hugh's son
- Stage name of Jean-Baptiste Fauchard (1737–1816), French actor

== Places ==
- Grandmesnil, former commune of Calvados, merged into the new commune of L'Oudon
- Grandménil, former commune of Wallonia merged into Manhay

== See also ==
- Mesnil (disambiguation)
