= La Croupte =

- Part of Livarot-Pays-d'Auge
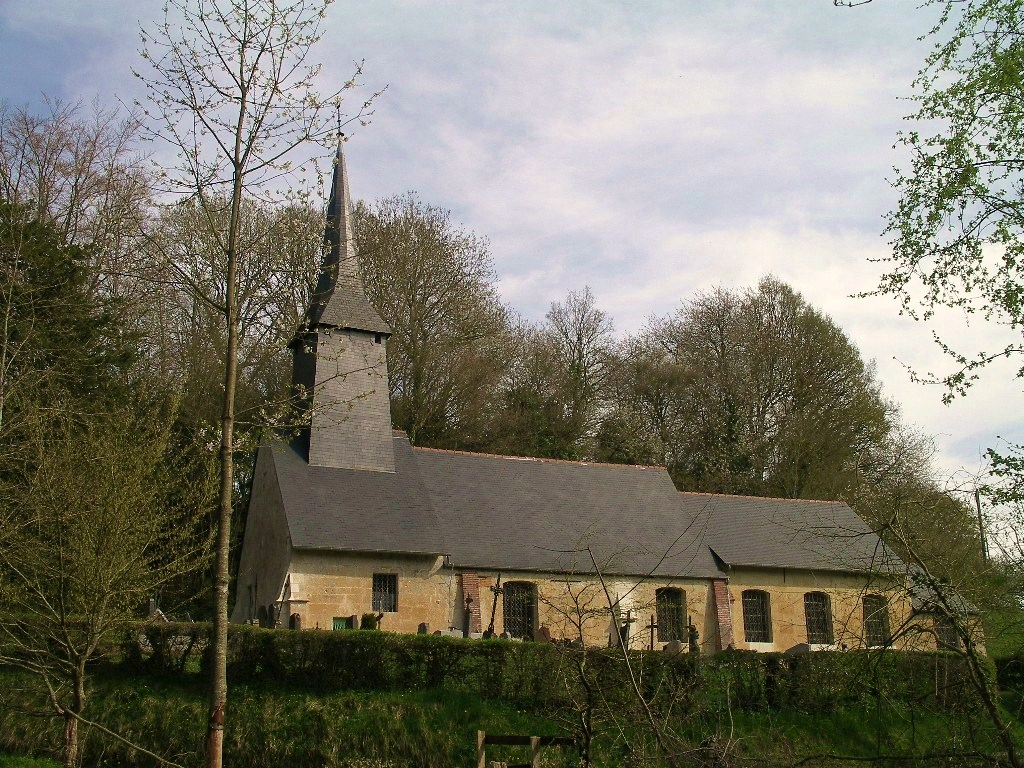
- Location of La Croupte
- Location within France Location within Normandy
- Coordinates: 49°01′24″N 0°17′14″E
- Country: France
- Region: Normandy
- Department: Calvados
- Arrondissement: Lisieux
- Canton: Livarot-Pays-d'Auge
- Commune: Livarot-Pays-d'Auge
- Area^{1}: 3.45 km^{2} (1.33 sq mi)
- Elevation: 180 m (590 ft)
- Highest elevation: 189 m (620 ft)
- Lowest elevation: 108 m (354 ft)
- Population (2023): 119
  - Density: 34.5/km^{2} (89.3/sq mi)
- Time zone: UTC+01:00 (CET)
  - Summer (DST): UTC+02:00 (CEST)
- Postal code: 14140
- ^{1} French Land Register data, which excludes lakes, ponds, glaciers > 1 km^{2} (0.386 sq mi or 247 acres) and river estuaries.

La Croupte (French pronunciation: [la kʁupt]) is a former commune in the Calvados department in the Normandy region in northwestern France. On 1 January 2016, it was merged into the new commune of Livarot-Pays-d'Auge.

== See also ==
- Communes of the Calvados department
