= Familly =

- Part of Livarot-Pays-d'Auge
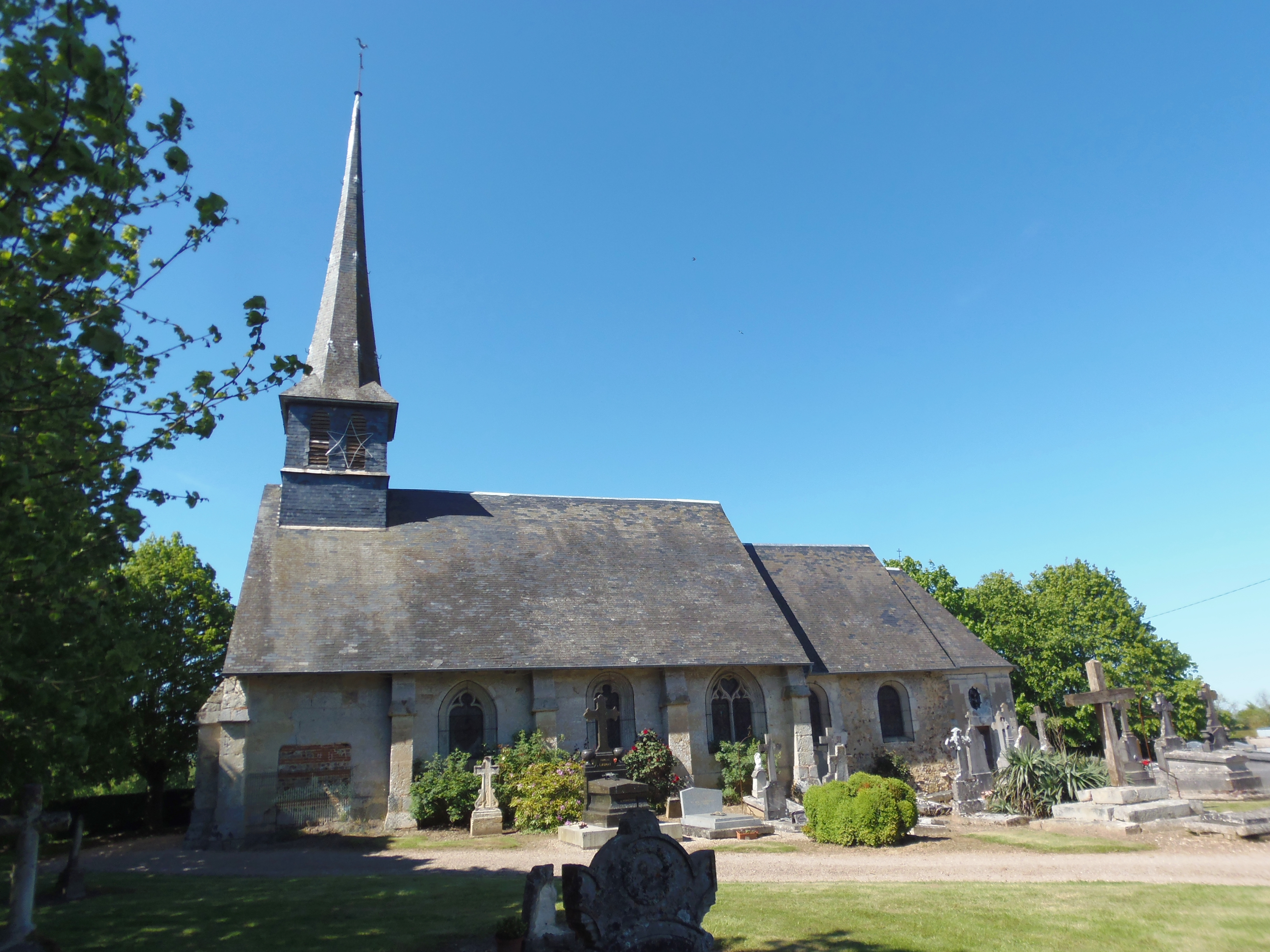
- Location of Familly
- Location within France Location within Normandy
- Coordinates: 48°58′03″N 0°21′19″E
- Country: France
- Region: Normandy
- Department: Calvados
- Arrondissement: Lisieux
- Canton: Livarot-Pays-d'Auge
- Commune: Livarot-Pays-d'Auge
- Area^{1}: 10.71 km^{2} (4.14 sq mi)
- Elevation: 178 m (584 ft)
- Highest elevation: 231 m (758 ft)
- Lowest elevation: 165 m (541 ft)
- Population (2023): 110
  - Density: 10/km^{2} (27/sq mi)
- Time zone: UTC+01:00 (CET)
  - Summer (DST): UTC+02:00 (CEST)
- Postal code: 14290
- ^{1} French Land Register data, which excludes lakes, ponds, glaciers > 1 km^{2} (0.386 sq mi or 247 acres) and river estuaries.

Familly (French pronunciation: [famiji]) is a former commune in the Calvados department in the Normandy region in northwestern France. On 1 January 2016, it was merged into the new commune of Livarot-Pays-d'Auge.

== History ==
The Duke of Monmouth attended school here.

== See also ==
- Communes of the Calvados department
