= Notre-Dame-de-Courson =

- Part of Livarot-Pays-d'Auge
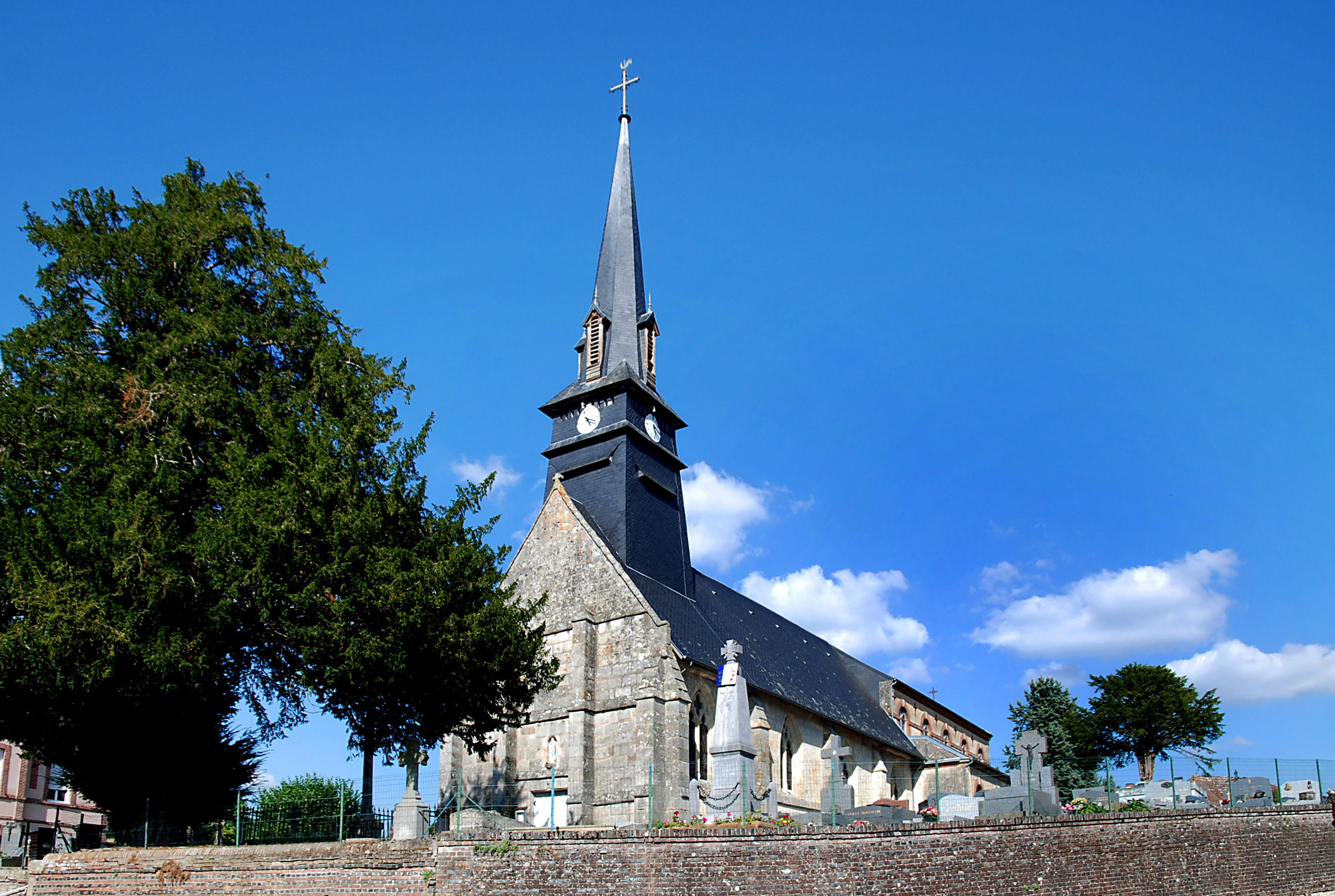
- Location of Notre-Dame-de-Courson
- Location within France Location within Normandy
- Coordinates: 48°59′30″N 0°15′47″E
- Country: France
- Region: Normandy
- Department: Calvados
- Arrondissement: Lisieux
- Canton: Livarot-Pays-d'Auge
- Commune: Livarot-Pays-d'Auge
- Area^{1}: 19.40 km^{2} (7.49 sq mi)
- Elevation: 113 m (371 ft)
- Highest elevation: 214 m (702 ft)
- Lowest elevation: 87 m (285 ft)
- Population (2023): 353
  - Density: 18.2/km^{2} (47.1/sq mi)
- Time zone: UTC+01:00 (CET)
  - Summer (DST): UTC+02:00 (CEST)
- Postal code: 14140
- ^{1} French Land Register data, which excludes lakes, ponds, glaciers > 1 km^{2} (0.386 sq mi or 247 acres) and river estuaries.

Notre-Dame-de-Courson (French pronunciation: [nɔtʁə dam də kuʁsɔ̃]) is a former commune in the department of Calvados in the Normandy region in northwestern France. On 1 January 2016, it was merged into the new commune of Livarot-Pays-d'Auge.

== History ==
Notre-Dame-de-Courson fell in medieval times within the barony of the Ferrers family at nearby Ferrières-Saint-Hilaire, who took part of the Norman Conquest of England. One branch of the Curzons from Notre-Dame-de-Courson accompanied their Ferrers overlord to England.

== International relations ==
Notre-Dame-de-Courson is twinned with the village of Sampford Peverell in Devon, England.

== See also ==
- Communes of the Calvados department
