= Meulles =

- Part of Livarot-Pays-d'Auge
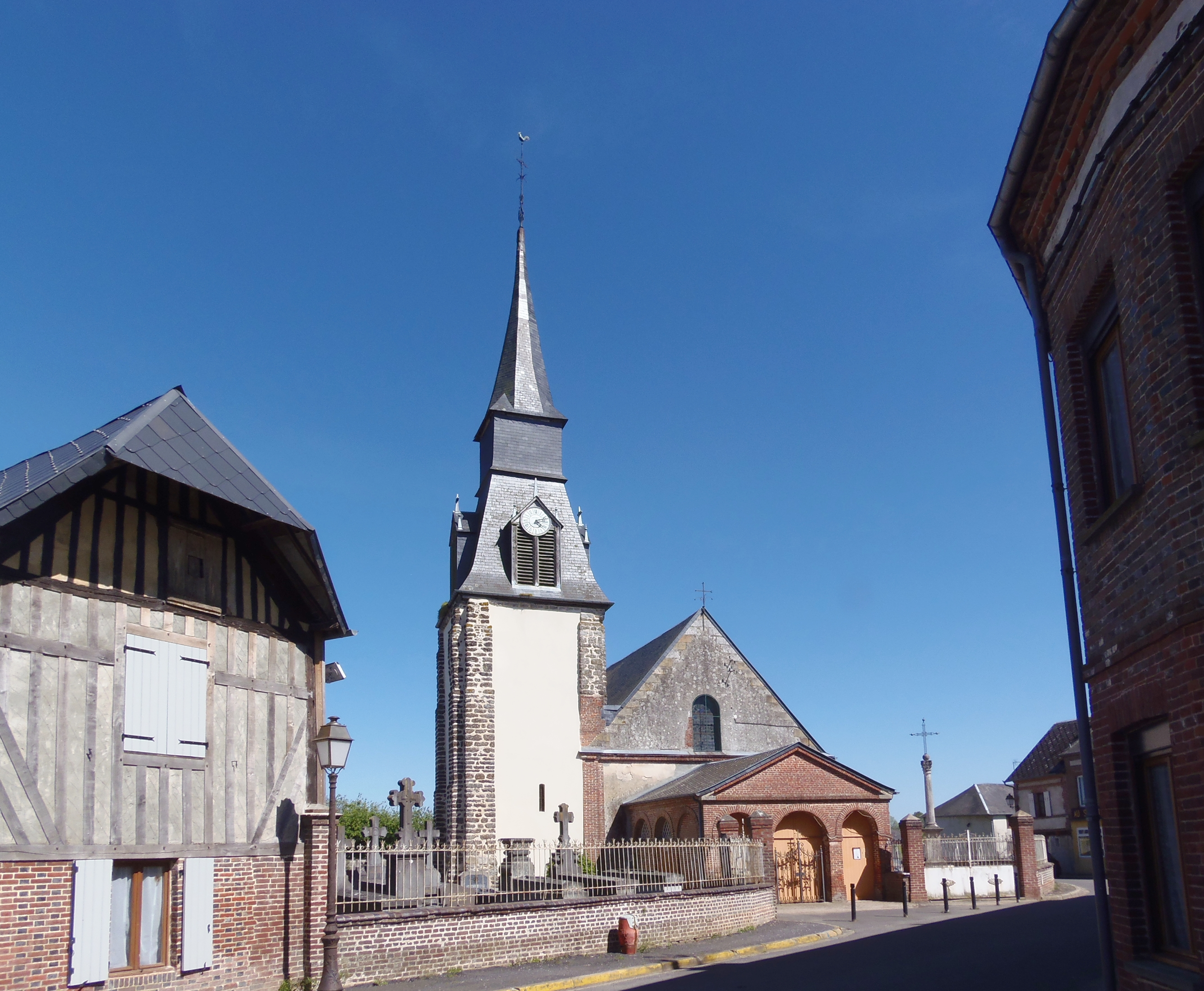
- Location of Meulles
- Location within France Location within Normandy
- Coordinates: 48°58′35″N 0°19′55″E
- Country: France
- Region: Normandy
- Department: Calvados
- Arrondissement: Lisieux
- Canton: Livarot-Pays-d'Auge
- Commune: Livarot-Pays-d'Auge
- Area^{1}: 16.29 km^{2} (6.29 sq mi)
- Elevation: 216 m (709 ft)
- Highest elevation: 228 m (748 ft)
- Lowest elevation: 144 m (472 ft)
- Population (2023): 316
  - Density: 19.4/km^{2} (50.2/sq mi)
- Time zone: UTC+01:00 (CET)
  - Summer (DST): UTC+02:00 (CEST)
- Postal code: 14290
- ^{1} French Land Register data, which excludes lakes, ponds, glaciers > 1 km^{2} (0.386 sq mi or 247 acres) and river estuaries.

Meulles (French pronunciation: [møl]) is a former commune in the Calvados department in the Normandy region in northwestern France. On 1 January 2016, it was merged into the new commune of Livarot-Pays-d'Auge.

== Sights ==
- The Statue of Ada.

== See also ==
- Communes of the Calvados department
