= Dumesnil =

Dumesnil (pronounced [dymenil]; "from the cottage") is a French surname. Notable people with the surname include:

- Bryan Dumesnil (born 1983), Canadian pitcher
- Cheryl Dumesnil (born 1969), American poet and editor
- Louis Gaulard Dumesnil (died 1702), French operatic tenor
- Marie Dumesnil (1713–1803), French actress
- Pierre Louis Dumesnil (1698–1781), French painter who specialized in genre scenes
- Suzanne Dechevaux-Dumesnil (1900–1989), tennis-partner, lover and later wife of Samuel Beckett
- Jacques Dumesnil (1904–1998), French film and television actor
- Jacques-Louis Dumesnil (1882–1956), French politician

== See also ==
- Peterson-Dumesnil House, a Victorian-Italianate house in the Crescent Hill neighborhood of Louisville, Kentucky, United States
- Saint-Pierre-du-Mesnil, a commune in the Eure department in Haute-Normandie in northern France
- Dumesny
