= Le Mesnil-Simon =

Le Mesnil-Simon can refer to:

- Le Mesnil-Simon, Calvados
- Le Mesnil-Simon, Eure-et-Loir
