= Saint-Martin-du-Mesnil-Oury =

- Part of Livarot-Pays-d'Auge
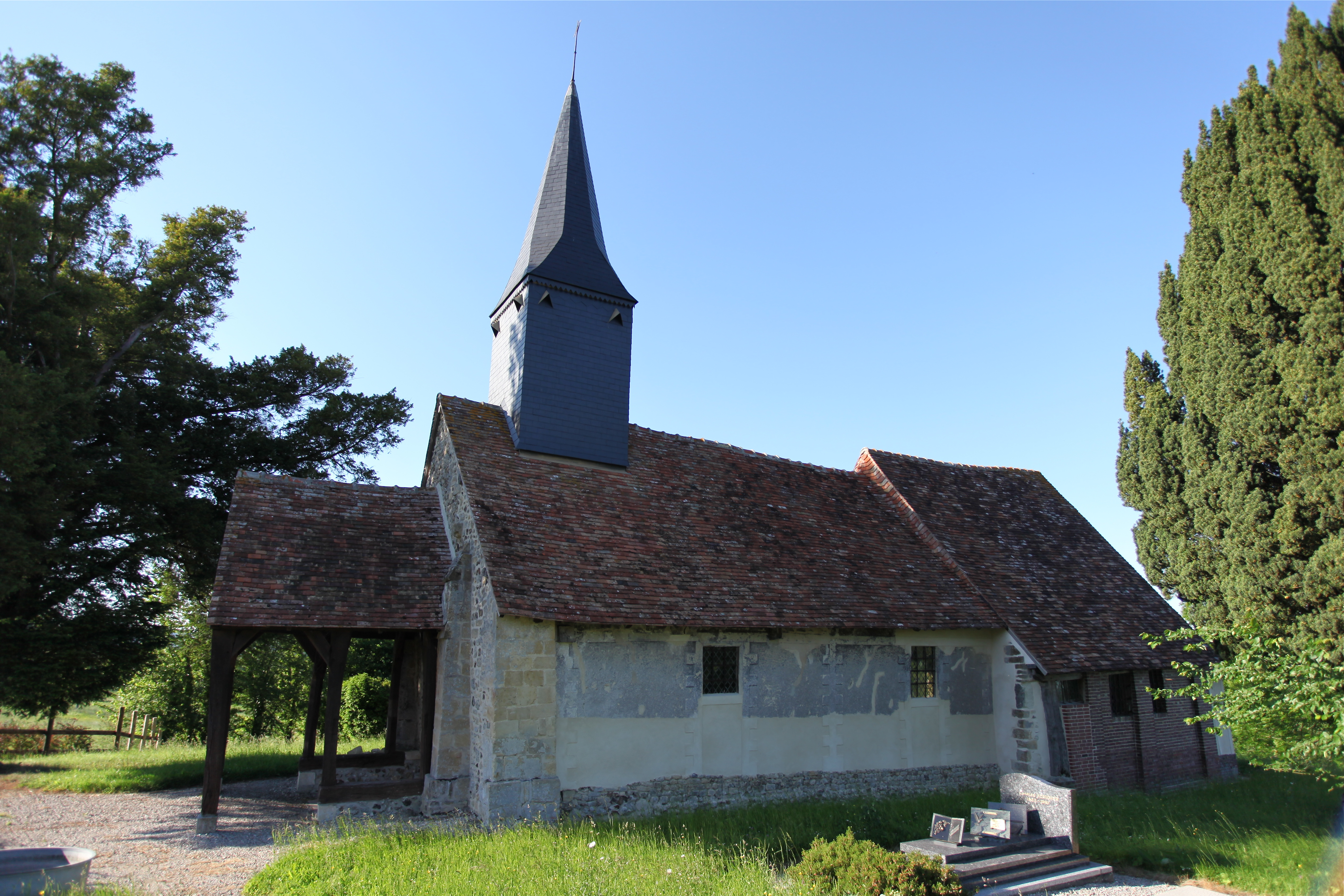
- Location of Saint-Martin-du-Mesnil-Oury
- Location within France Location within Normandy
- Coordinates: 49°01′56″N 0°07′32″E
- Country: France
- Region: Normandy
- Department: Calvados
- Arrondissement: Lisieux
- Canton: Livarot-Pays-d'Auge
- Commune: Livarot-Pays-d'Auge
- Area^{1}: 4.78 km^{2} (1.85 sq mi)
- Elevation: 50 m (160 ft)
- Highest elevation: 182 m (597 ft)
- Lowest elevation: 43 m (141 ft)
- Population (2023): 119
  - Density: 24.9/km^{2} (64.5/sq mi)
- Time zone: UTC+01:00 (CET)
  - Summer (DST): UTC+02:00 (CEST)
- Postal code: 14140
- ^{1} French Land Register data, which excludes lakes, ponds, glaciers > 1 km^{2} (0.386 sq mi or 247 acres) and river estuaries.

Saint-Martin-du-Mesnil-Oury (French pronunciation: [sɛ̃ maʁtɛ̃ dy mɛnil uʁi]) is a former commune in the Calvados department in the Normandy region in northwestern France. On 1 January 2016, it was merged into the new commune of Livarot-Pays-d'Auge.

== See also ==
- Communes of the Calvados department
