= Les Moutiers-Hubert =

- Part of Livarot-Pays-d'Auge
- Coat of arms
- Location of Les Moutiers-Hubert
- Location within France Location within Normandy
- Coordinates: 48°58′39″N 0°16′03″E
- Country: France
- Region: Normandy
- Department: Calvados
- Arrondissement: Lisieux
- Canton: Livarot-Pays-d'Auge
- Commune: Livarot-Pays-d'Auge
- Area^{1}: 8.13 km^{2} (3.14 sq mi)
- Elevation: 120 m (390 ft)
- Highest elevation: 213 m (699 ft)
- Lowest elevation: 102 m (335 ft)
- Population (2023): 46
  - Density: 5.7/km^{2} (15/sq mi)
- Time zone: UTC+01:00 (CET)
  - Summer (DST): UTC+02:00 (CEST)
- Postal code: 14140
- ^{1} French Land Register data, which excludes lakes, ponds, glaciers > 1 km^{2} (0.386 sq mi or 247 acres) and river estuaries.

Les Moutiers-Hubert (French pronunciation: [le mutje ybɛʁ]) is a former commune in the department of Calvados in the Normandy region in northwestern France. On 1 January 2016, it was merged into the new commune of Livarot-Pays-d'Auge.

== See also ==
- Communes of the Calvados department
