= Fervaques =

- Part of Livarot-Pays-d'Auge
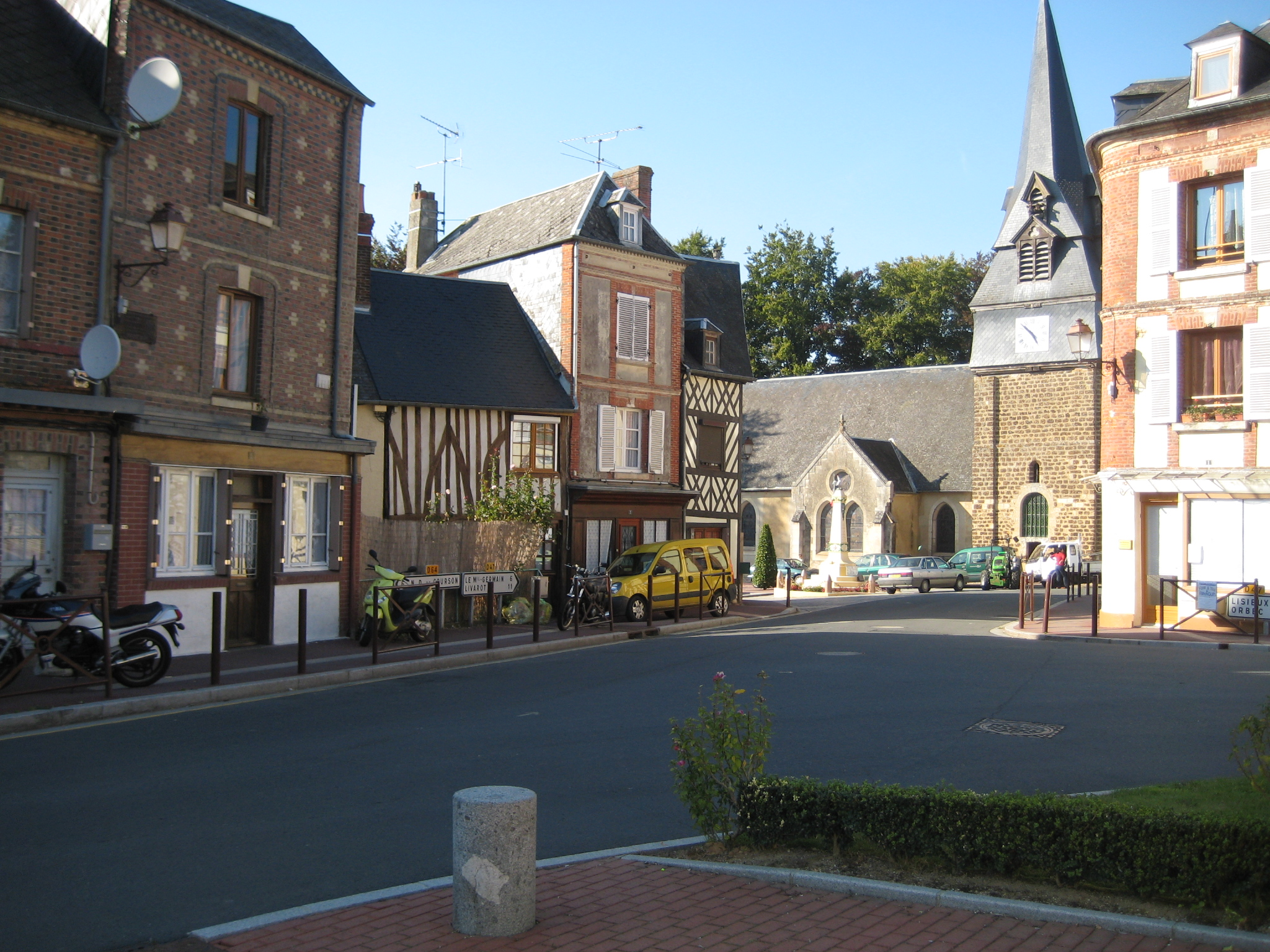
- Location of Fervaques
- Location within France Location within Normandy
- Coordinates: 49°02′31″N 0°15′18″E
- Country: France
- Region: Normandy
- Department: Calvados
- Arrondissement: Lisieux
- Canton: Livarot-Pays-d'Auge
- Commune: Livarot-Pays-d'Auge
- Area^{1}: 10.67 km^{2} (4.12 sq mi)
- Elevation: 160 m (520 ft)
- Highest elevation: 197 m (646 ft)
- Lowest elevation: 73 m (240 ft)
- Population (2023): 718
  - Density: 67.3/km^{2} (174/sq mi)
- Time zone: UTC+01:00 (CET)
  - Summer (DST): UTC+02:00 (CEST)
- Postal code: 14140
- ^{1} French Land Register data, which excludes lakes, ponds, glaciers > 1 km^{2} (0.386 sq mi or 247 acres) and river estuaries.

Fervaques (French pronunciation: [fɛʁvak]) is a former commune in the Calvados department in the Normandy region in northwestern France. On 1 January 2016, it was merged into the new commune of Livarot-Pays-d'Auge.

== See also ==
- Communes of the Calvados department
