= Tortisambert =

- Part of Livarot-Pays-d'Auge
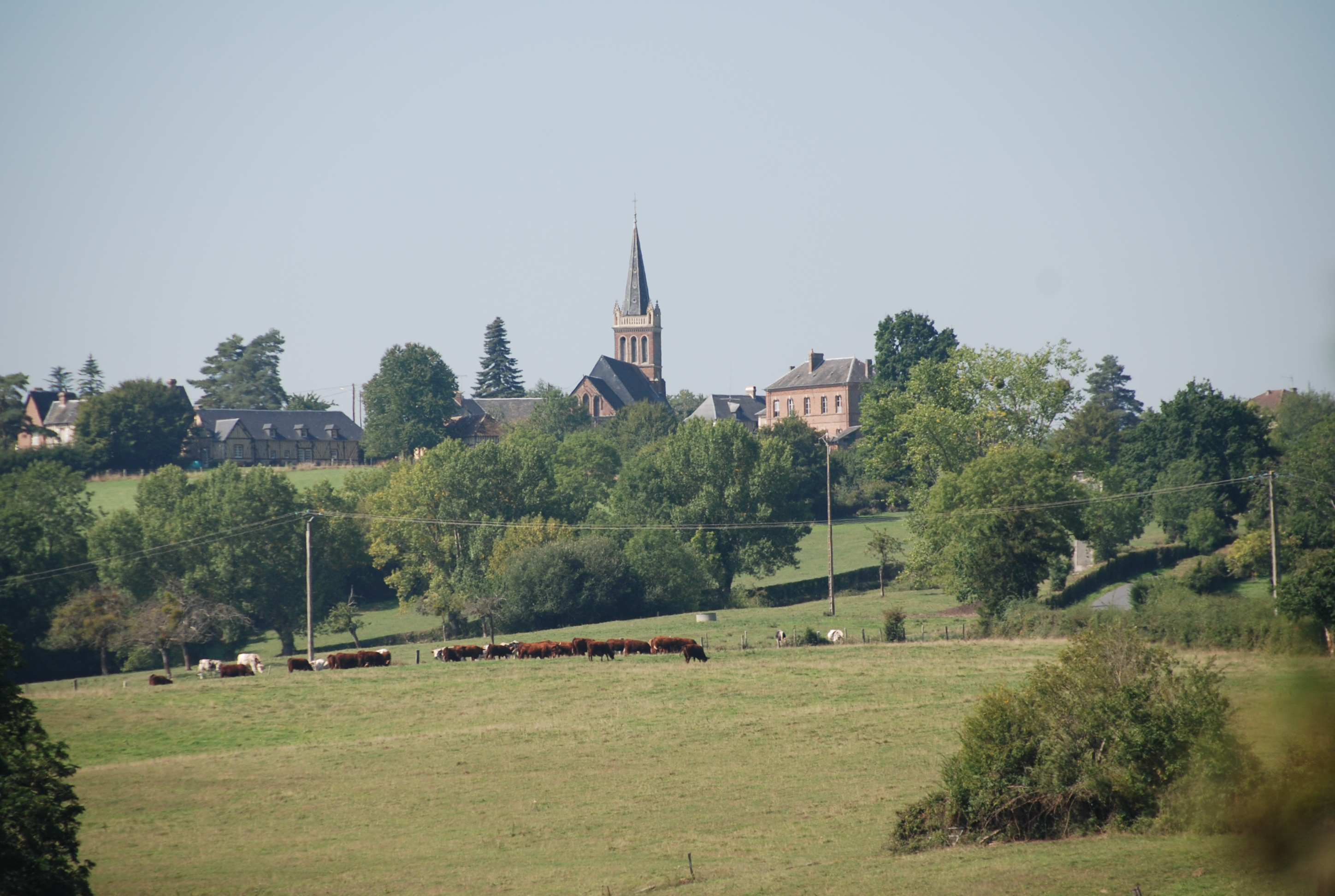
- Location of Tortisambert
- Location within France Location within Normandy
- Coordinates: 48°58′01″N 0°07′06″E
- Country: France
- Region: Normandy
- Department: Calvados
- Arrondissement: Lisieux
- Canton: Livarot-Pays-d'Auge
- Commune: Livarot-Pays-d'Auge
- Area^{1}: 6.07 km^{2} (2.34 sq mi)
- Elevation: 159 m (522 ft)
- Highest elevation: 213 m (699 ft)
- Lowest elevation: 77 m (253 ft)
- Population (2023): 126
  - Density: 20.8/km^{2} (53.8/sq mi)
- Time zone: UTC+01:00 (CET)
  - Summer (DST): UTC+02:00 (CEST)
- Postal code: 14140
- ^{1} French Land Register data, which excludes lakes, ponds, glaciers > 1 km^{2} (0.386 sq mi or 247 acres) and river estuaries.

Tortisambert (French pronunciation: [tɔʁtizɑ̃bɛʁ]) is a former commune in the Calvados department in the Normandy region of northwestern France. On 1 January 2016, it was merged into the new commune of Livarot-Pays-d'Auge and became a delegated commune.

== Geography ==
The commune of Tortisambert covered an area of 6.07 km², with elevations ranging from 77 m to 213 m above sea level.

== Heritage and notable sites ==
- A 16th-century manor, known as the Manoir de la Varinière, is a listed monument

== See also ==
- Communes of the Calvados department
