= Saint-Michel-de-Livet =

- Part of Livarot-Pays-d'Auge
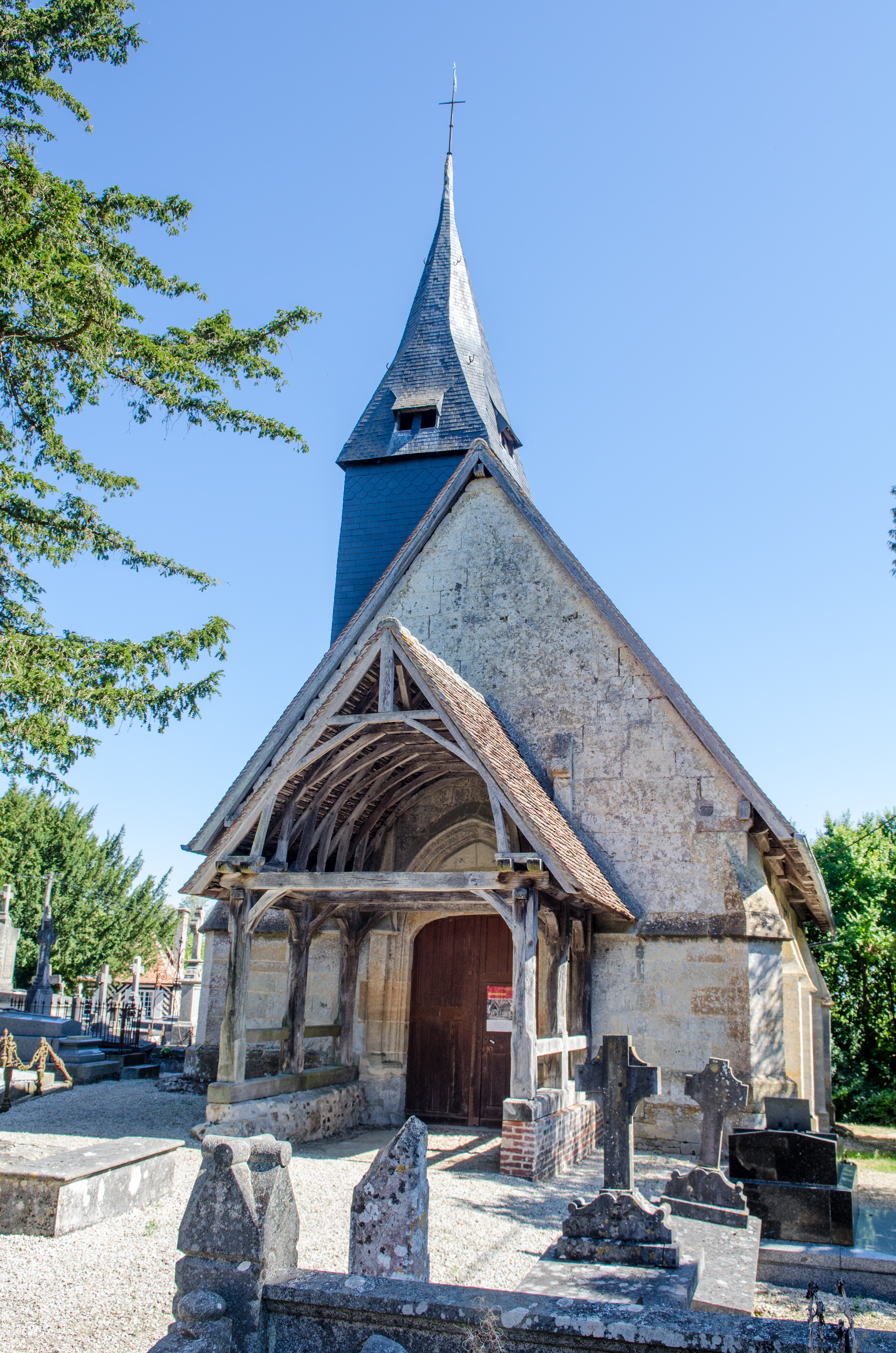
- Location of Saint-Michel-de-Livet
- Location within France Location within Normandy
- Coordinates: 49°01′12″N 0°08′10″E
- Country: France
- Region: Normandy
- Department: Calvados
- Arrondissement: Lisieux
- Canton: Livarot-Pays-d'Auge
- Commune: Livarot-Pays-d'Auge
- Area^{1}: 4.74 km^{2} (1.83 sq mi)
- Elevation: 176 m (577 ft)
- Highest elevation: 184 m (604 ft)
- Lowest elevation: 52 m (171 ft)
- Population (2023): 172
  - Density: 36.3/km^{2} (94.0/sq mi)
- Time zone: UTC+01:00 (CET)
  - Summer (DST): UTC+02:00 (CEST)
- Postal code: 14140
- ^{1} French Land Register data, which excludes lakes, ponds, glaciers > 1 km^{2} (0.386 sq mi or 247 acres) and river estuaries.

Saint-Michel-de-Livet (French pronunciation: [sɛ̃ miʃɛl də livɛ]) is a former commune in the Calvados department in the Normandy region in northwestern France. On 1 January 2016, it was merged into the new commune of Livarot-Pays-d'Auge.

== See also ==
- Communes of the Calvados department
