= Pilsbury Castle =

Castle in Derbyshire, England

- Derbyshire, England
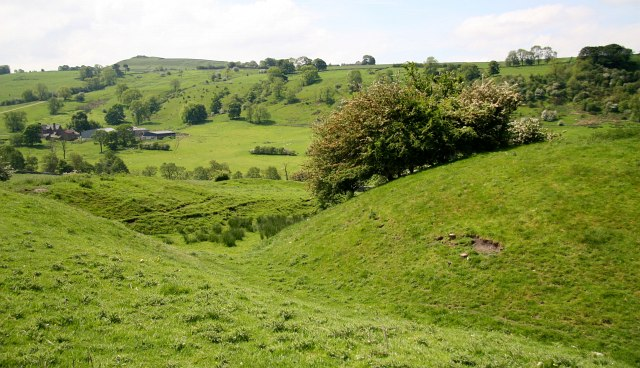
- Earthworks of Pilsbury Castle

Site information
- Type: Motte-and-bailey
- Open to the public: Yes
- Condition: Earthworks only remain

Location
- Shown within Derbyshire
- Coordinates: 53.171569°N 1.831167°W

Site history
- Materials: Wood

Scheduled monument
- Official name: Pilsbury Castle Hills motte and bailey castle
- Designated: 13 October 1937
- Reference no.: 1011199

Pilsbury Castle was a Norman castle in Derbyshire near the present-day village of Pilsbury, overlooking the River Dove.

== Details ==
Pilsbury Castle occupied an area of high ground approximately 175 by 150 yards (160 by 137 m) overlooking the River Dove, near the village of Pilsbury. The castle was probably originally an Iron Age fortification before being used by the Normans, and the name "Pilsbury Castle" forms from the Celtic pil, the Saxon bury and the Norman castel, all meaning "fortified site". In early medieval times, the site would have been located along the River Dove routeway, and would also have overlooked a key crossing point.

The Normans built a substantial motte-and-bailey castle on the site, and several theories have been put forward as to when and who did so. One theory is that the castle was built in the years following the Norman conquest of England. The area around Pilsbury was granted to Henry de Ferrers by King William; the area was devastated during the harrying of the North, and the castle may have been built in the aftermath by Henry to establish control. Henry built other castles at Tutbury and Duffield, making Pilsbury part of this set of 11th-century fortifications. An alternative suggestion is that it was built by Robert de Ferrers or his father, around the period known as The Anarchy for, while the de Ferrers supported Stephen of England, the neighbouring Earl of Chester supported Empress Matilda.

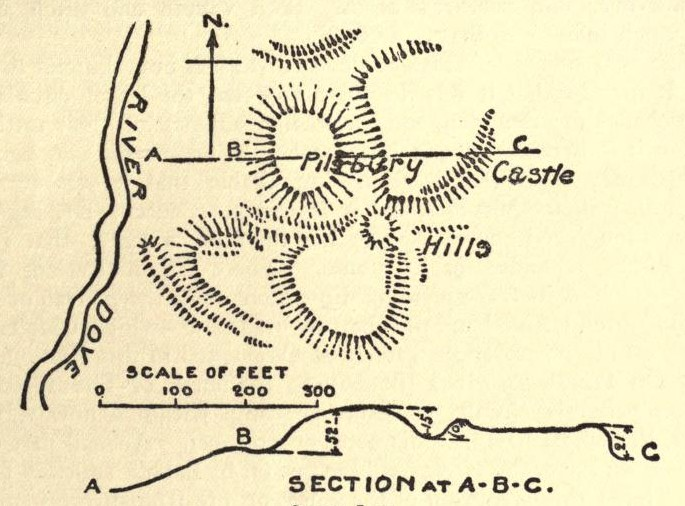
1905 plan of Pilsbury Castle

The castle itself includes a motte and two bailey enclosures, approximately 40 metres (130 ft) and 45 metres (148 ft) across respectively. It had timber defences, ditches and additional flanking earthworks. The castle appears to have been abandoned in subsequent years, and it may be that it was destroyed after William de Ferrers' part in the Revolt of 1173–74, or it might have become abandoned when the land passed to the Duchy of Lancaster after the sixth Earl was dispossessed. Alternatively, it may simply have become redundant as nearby Hartington grew in importance and the village of Pilsbury became increasingly depopulated.

By the 20th century, there was little to see except for a mound on a limestone outcrop and the remains of various earthworks. At the beginning of the present century, however, archaeological surveys revealed the foundations of the castle. The site is a Scheduled Ancient Monument.

== See also ==
- Castles in Great Britain and Ireland
- List of castles in England

== Bibliography ==
- Cox, J. C. "Ancient Earthworks," in Page (ed) (1905).
- Landon, N., P. Ash, A. Payne, and G. Phillips (2006) "Pilsbury: A Forgotten Castle," Derbyshire Archaeological Journal, Vol 126. pp 82‑102. doi:10.5284/1066652
- Page, William. (ed) (1905) The Victoria History of the County of Derby, vol. 1. London: James Street.
- Turbutt, G. (1999) A History of Derbyshire. Volume 2: Medieval Derbyshire. Cardiff: Merton Priory Press.
