= Peverel =

Peverel can refer to:

== Places ==
- Hatfield Peverel, a large urban village and civil parish at the centre of Essex, England
  - Hatfield Peverel Priory, a former Benedictine priory in Hatfield Peverel
  - Hatfield Peverel railway station, a railway station serving the village in Essex
- Honour of Peverel, a geographic area in the north of England comprising part of the historic feudal barony held by the Peverel family
- Peveril Castle, now a ruined late medieval castle in Castleton, Derbyshire, England
- Sampford Peverell, a village and civil parish in Mid-Devon, England

== People ==
- Thomas Peverel (died 1419), a medieval prelate who was successively bishop of Ossory, Llandaff, and Worcester
- William Peverel (c. 1050 – c. 1115), a Norman knight granted lands in England following the Norman Conquest
- William Peverel the Younger, (c. 1080 – 1155), son of William Peverel

== See also ==
- Peverell (disambiguation)
- Peveril (disambiguation)
