= 6th Earl of Derby =

6th Earl of Derby may refer to:

- Robert de Ferrers, 6th Earl of Derby (1239–1279), English nobleman
- William Stanley, 6th Earl of Derby (1561–1642), English nobleman and politician
