= Peverill =

Peverill is a surname and given name of Old French origin, a variant of the surname Peverall, which means 'little pepper'. Notable people with the surname include:

== Surname ==
- Damien Peverill (born 1979), Australian former rules footballer
- Noel Peverill (1907–1997), Australian rules footballer

== Given name ==
- Peverill Squire (born 1955), American political scientist

== See also ==
- Peveril (disambiguation)
- Peverel (disambiguation)
- Peverell (disambiguation)
