= 3rd Earl of Derby =

3rd Earl of Derby may refer to:

- William de Ferrers, 3rd Earl of Derby (died 1190), English nobleman
- Henry IV of England (1367–1413), previously the Earl of Derby, King of England and Lord of Ireland from 1399
- Edward Stanley, 3rd Earl of Derby (c. 1509–1572), English nobleman and politician
