= 4th Earl of Derby =

4th Earl of Derby may refer to:

- William de Ferrers, 4th Earl of Derby (c. 1168 – c. 1247), favourite of John, King of England
- Henry Stanley, 4th Earl of Derby (1531–1593), prominent English nobleman, diplomat, and politician
