= Duffield Castle, Derbyshire =

Norman Castle in the UK

Coordinates: 52.99280°N 1.48970°W

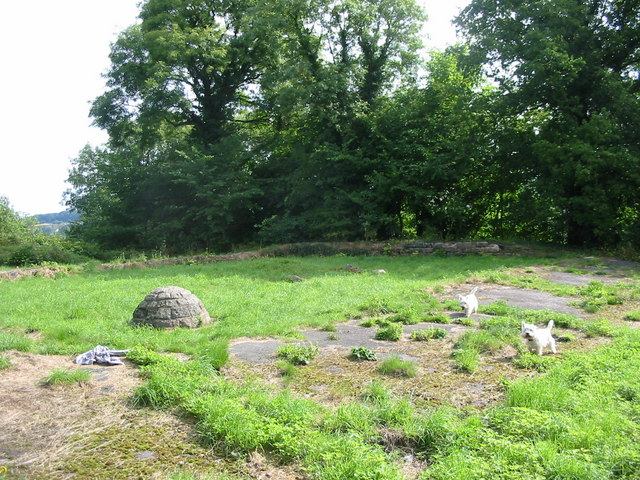
Duffield Castle today

Duffield Castle was a Norman castle in Duffield, Derbyshire. The site is a scheduled monument.

It was on a rocky promontory facing the river, easily defended, though it is debatable whether it was inhabited in prehistoric times. It is also controversial whether the Romans maintained a military presence to protect the ford, nearby, across which the convoys of lead from Lutudarum (possibly Wirksworth) joined Rykneld Street at Derventio (now part of Derby), en route for the North Sea ports.

However, remains that appear to be of Anglo-Saxon origin have been found, suggesting occupation by persons of some position, possibly a Saxon Thane of the name of Siward, or his relatives. Considerable amounts of Roman or Romano-British pottery have also been found, including roof tiles of Roman pattern. Some of the artefacts that were discovered were lodged with the Derby Museum, while others were kept in the Parish Room; many have disappeared.

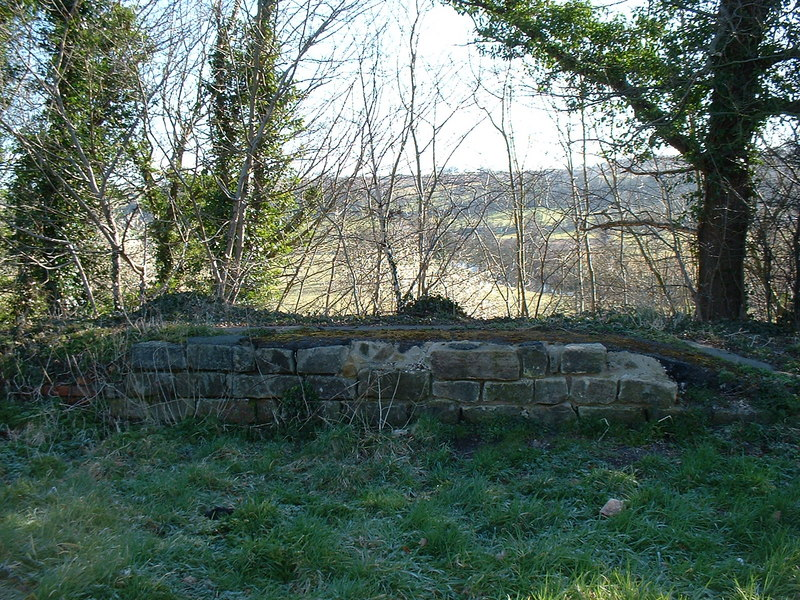
Stonework representing foundation wall

== The Norman castle ==
In or around 1066 Henry de Ferrers (sometimes spelt Ferrars), having rendered great service to King William, was granted estates in Derbyshire, which became known as Duffield Frith. This extended between Heage and Shottle on the North, and Tutbury on the South. He built Tutbury Castle, and made it his chief seat; but he needed an outpost to protect his lands further north, so he built another castle, probably of wood, at Duffield.

His third son, Robert, distinguished himself in the Battle of the Standard against the Scots in 1138 and was made the Earl of Derby.

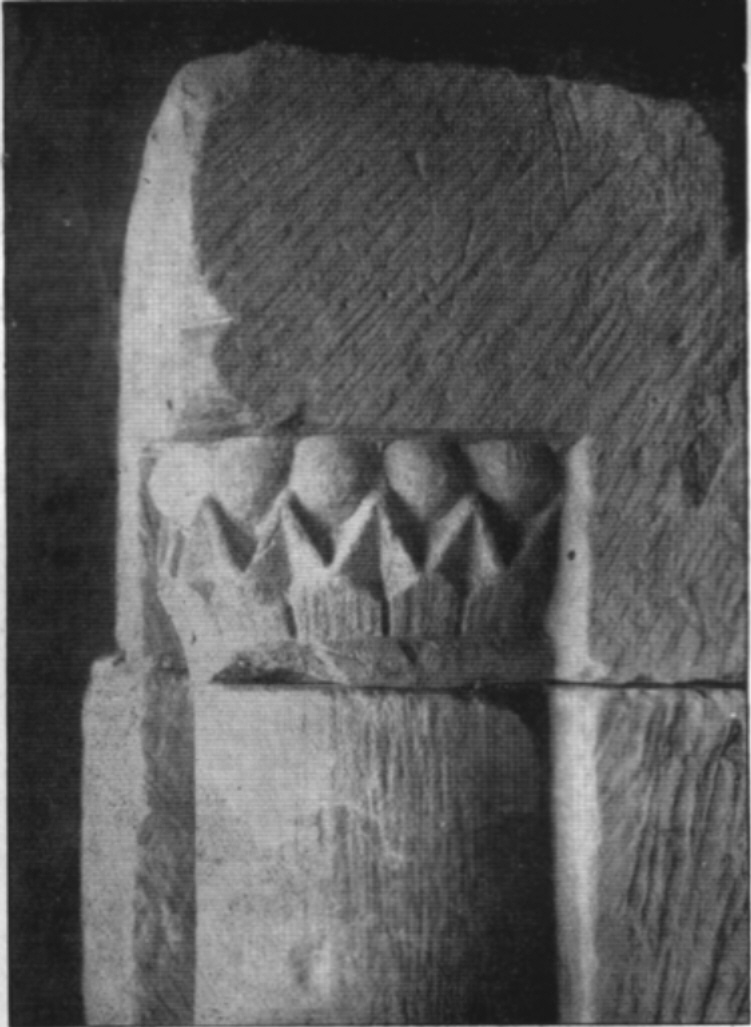
Norman capital from Duffield Castle

His great grandson, William, who succeeded to the position in 1162 joined the King's sons in a rebellion against their father, Henry II, and in 1173 both castles were destroyed.

Following him was his second, William, a favourite of King John who restored his earldom along with the manors of Wirksworth, Ashbourne and, later, Horston Castle (Horsley). At some time, the castles at Tutbury and Duffield were rebuilt, this time of stone. The next William also enjoyed many Royal favours.

The next Earl, Robert, the seventh generation, rebelled against Henry III and Tutbury Castle was destroyed. Although pardoned, Robert rebelled again and being defeated in battle at Chesterfield was dispossessed in 1269 and Duffield Castle was destroyed. His lands were given to Prince Edmund, who was shortly afterwards created Earl of Lancaster.

The castle was literally razed to the ground, much of the stone being scavenged for other buildings, and gradually became overgrown. Memories of a castle persisted, preserved in the name of "Castle Orchard", which extended from the present cottages of that name at the base of the castle mound, to the Hazlewood Road. The site was rediscovered in 1885.

== Architecture ==
Duffield Castle originally occupied over an estimated 5 acres of land and had a massive keep. The keep spanned 31 metres in length and width (approximately 0.24 acres) and was constructed from stone.

In 1924, a H. Walton stated that there was a series of stairways and entrances on the west side that lead to the first floor; due to a lack of either windows or entrances on the ground floor level. The first floor was believed to contain a guardroom or stateroom and some private inner rooms. Furthermore, H. Walton also believed that the second floor contained domestic and small apartments, kitchens, private retirement rooms and possibly a chapel.

== Excavations ==
When the site was excavated, the foundations of a traditional Norman motte and bailey castle were discovered, with a stone keep built upon it. What was remarkable was the size of the latter, about 98 feet in length and 95 feet in breadth, only slightly smaller than the White Tower in London.

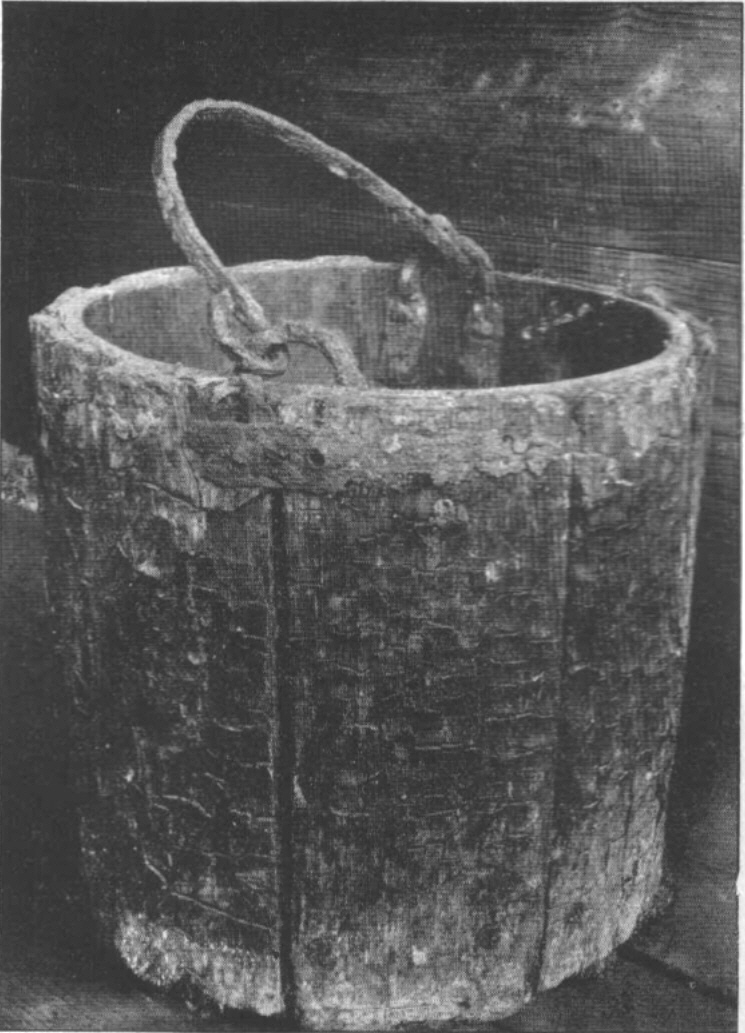
Norman bucket from Duffield Castle well – now in Derby Museum

The grounds were preserved, with the foundations marked out, and donated to the National Trust, in 1899, one of its earliest archaeological monuments. For many years, upkeep was carried out by the parish council, but has recently been taken back by the Trust.

Although further investigations were carried out in the 1930s and in 1957, few medieval remains were found, but the idea that the site had been occupied before the arrival of the Normans was confirmed by a number of Romano‑British finds.

A geophysical investigation of the site was carried out by the University of Bradford in 2001 and this revealed traces of other structures to the south and the southeast which would appear to date from the same period. The Trust is currently considering raising the necessary funds to carry out further investigations.

As a postscript, the de Ferrers family in Normandy presided over an important centre for iron manufacture. It has been suggested that this is the origin of nailmaking in Belper.
