= Bolsover Castle =

Castle in the town of Bolsover, Derbyshire, England

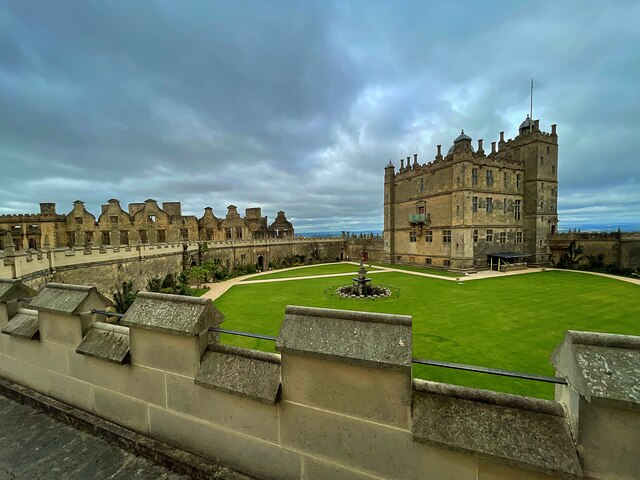
- The Wall Walk at Bolsover Castle

- Location within Derbyshire

General information
- Location: Bolsover, Derbyshire, United Kingdom
- Coordinates: 53°13′53″N 1°17′49″W

Scheduled monument
- Official name: Bolsover Castle
- Designated: 9 October 1981
- Reference no.: 1012496

Listed Building – Grade I
- Designated: 23 March 1989
- Reference no.: 1108976

Bolsover Castle is in the town of Bolsover (grid reference SK471707), in the north-east of the English county of Derbyshire. Built in the early 17th century, the present castle lies on the earthworks and ruins of the 12th-century medieval castle; the first structure of the present castle was built between 1612 and 1617 by Sir Charles Cavendish. The site is now in the care of the English Heritage charity, as both a Grade I listed building and a Scheduled Ancient Monument.

== History ==
=== Medieval ===
The original castle was built by the Peverel family in the 12th century and became Crown property in 1155 when William Peverel the Younger died. The Ferrers family who were Earls of Derby laid claim to the Peverel property.

When a group of barons led by King Henry II's sons – Henry the Young King, Geoffrey Duke of Brittany, and Prince Richard, later Richard the Lionheart – revolted against the King's rule, Henry spent £116 on building at the castles of Bolsover and Peveril in Derbyshire. The garrison was increased to a force led by 20 knights and was shared with the castles of Peveril and Nottingham during the revolt. King John ascended the throne in 1199 after his brother Richard's death. William de Ferrers, 4th Earl of Derby maintained the claim of the Earls of Derby to the Peveril estates. He paid John 2000 marks for the lordship of the Peak, but the Crown retained possession of Bolsover and Peveril Castles. On 1 June 1216, John ordered Brian de Lisle to defend the castle if it could be held against the rebels and to destroy (slight) it if it could not be held.

John finally gave the castle of Bolsover and Peveril to Ferrers in 1216 to secure his support in the face of country-wide rebellion. However, Brian de Lisle refused to hand them over. Although Lisle and Ferrers were both John's supporters, John gave Ferrers permission to use force to take the castles. The situation was still chaotic when Henry III became king after his father's death in 1216. Bolsover fell to Ferrers' forces in 1217 after a siege.

The castle was returned to crown control in 1223, at which point £33 was spent on repairing the damage the Earl of Derby had caused when capturing the castle six years earlier. Over the next 20 years, four towers were added, the keep was repaired, various parts of the curtain wall were repaired, and a kitchen and barn were built, all at a cost of £181. From 1290 onward, the castle and its surrounding manor were granted to a series of local farmers. Under their custodianship, the castle gradually fell into a state of disrepair.

=== Post-medieval ===
Bolsover Castle was granted to Francis Talbot, 5th Earl of Shrewsbury, by Edward VI in 1553. His son, George Talbot, 6th Earl of Shrewsbury was the keeper of Mary, Queen of Scots at Chatsworth House. In 1574, two Scottish servants in the stable at Bolsover, Alexander Hamilton and John Stewart, were suspected of carrying letters secretly to Mary. Stewart mentioned that the bailiff of Bolsover was Henry Smith, Jane Mason was housekeeper, and the maids were Jane Jackson and Elizabeth Wise.

Following Shrewsbury's death in 1590, his son Gilbert Talbot, 7th Earl of Shrewsbury, sold the ruins of Bolsover Castle to his step-brother and brother-in-law Sir Charles Cavendish, who wanted to build a new castle on the site. Working with the famous builder and designer Robert Smythson, Cavendish's castle was designed for elegant living rather than defence, and was unfinished at the time of the two men's deaths, in 1614 and 1617 respectively. Accounts survive for building the early stages of the "Little Castle." Unusually for this period female labour was recorded, and the women's names or husbands' names are given.

The building of the castle was continued by Cavendish's two sons, William and Charles, who were influenced by the Italian-inspired work of the architect Inigo Jones. The tower, known today as the 'Little Castle', was completed around 1621. A masque Love's Welcome at Bolsover by Ben Jonson was performed on 30 July 1634 during a royal visit. Construction was interrupted by the Civil Wars of 1642 to 1651, during which the castle was taken by the Parliamentarians, who slighted it, when it fell into a ruinous state.

William Cavendish, who was created Marquess of Newcastle in 1643 and Duke of Newcastle-upon-Tyne in 1665, added a new hall and staterooms to the Terrace Range, and by the time of his death in 1676 the castle had been restored to good order. The main usage of the building extended over twenty years, and it is presumed that the family lived at the castle towards the end of that period. It then passed through Margaret Bentinck, Duchess of Portland into the Bentinck family, and ultimately became one of the seats of the Earls and Dukes of Portland. After 1883, the castle was uninhabited, and in 1945 it was given to the nation by the William Cavendish-Bentinck, 7th Duke of Portland. The Ministry of Works stabilized the buildings and began opening portions to visitations by the public. The castle is now in the care of English Heritage and operated as a tourist attraction.

In October 2007 the television paranormal investigation show Most Haunted Live! visited the castle as part of their Halloween events on Living TV, and in 2017 the site was voted the most haunted site by English Heritage staff. Antiques Roadshow was held at the castle in July 2015.

Bolsover Castle is a Scheduled Ancient Monument, a "nationally important" historic building and archaeological site which has been given protection against unauthorised change. It is also a Grade I listed building (first listed in 1985) and recognised as an internationally important structure.

== Gallery ==
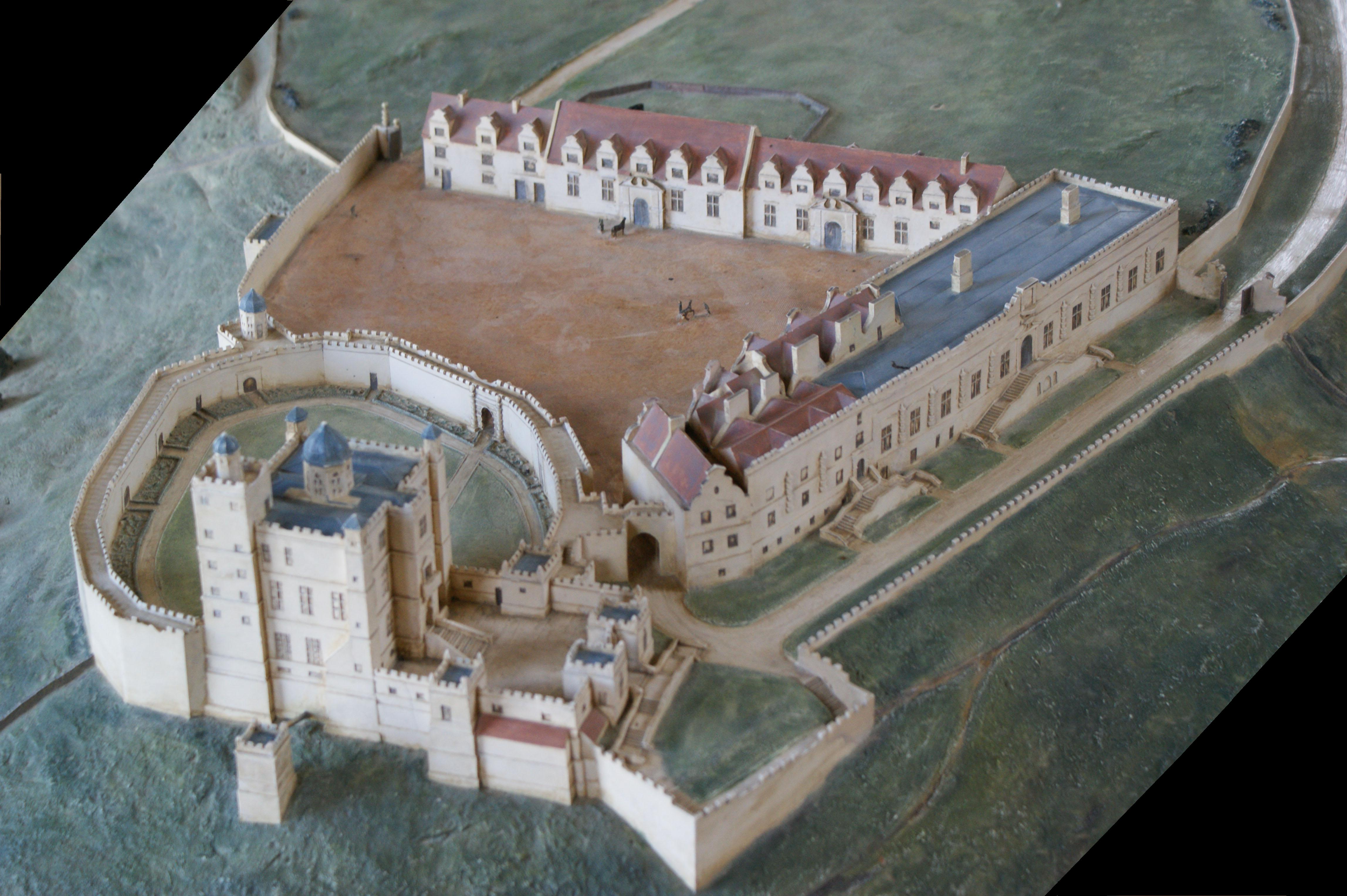
Model of Bolsover Castle as it may have looked in the late 1600s

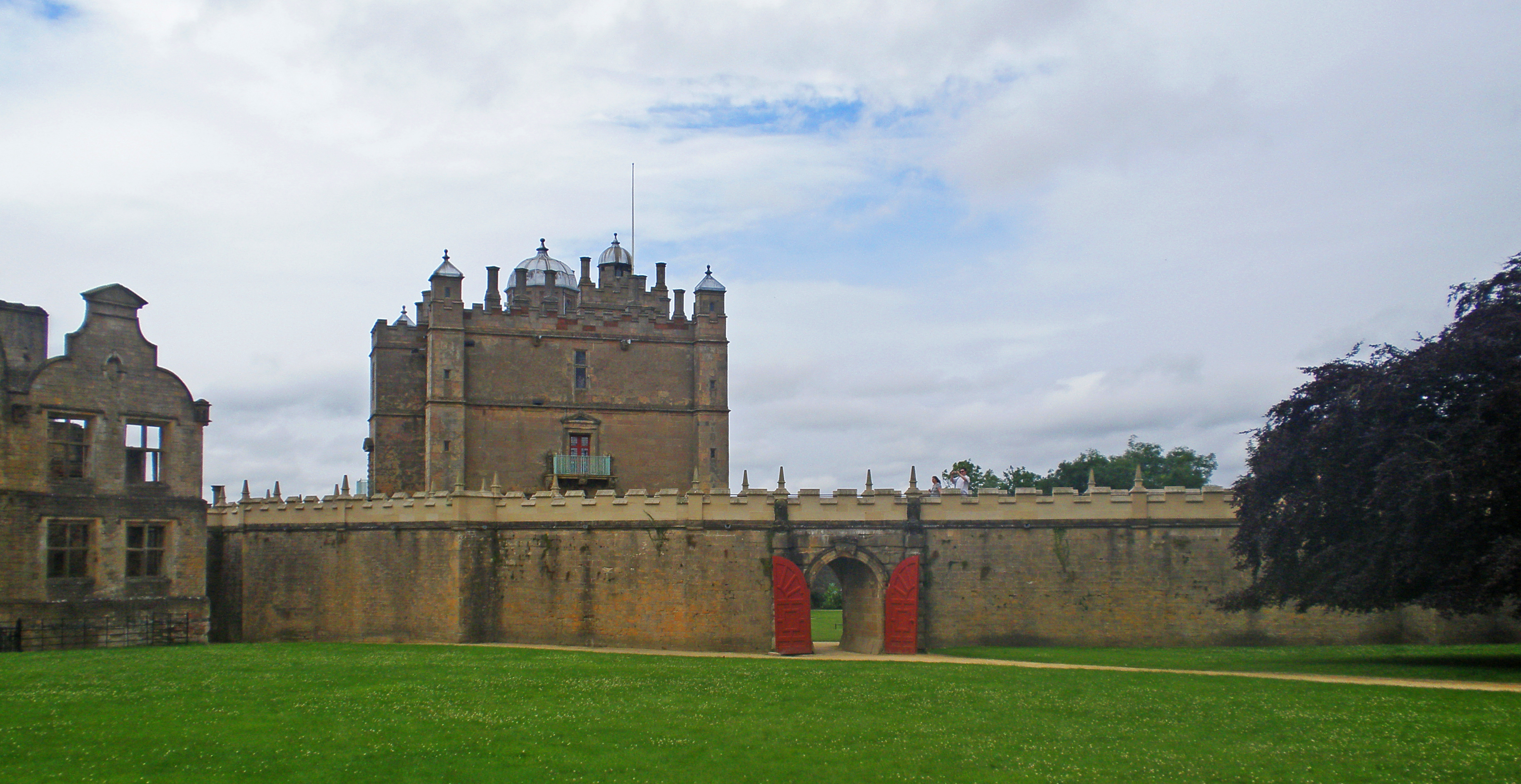
Red doors leading into the Little Castle

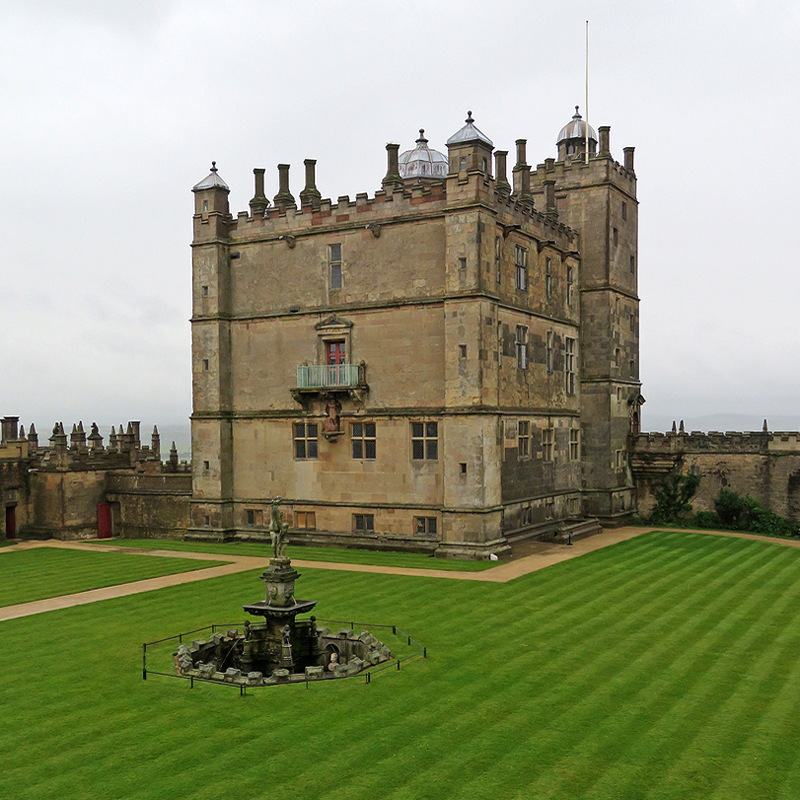
The Little Castle and the Venus Fountain

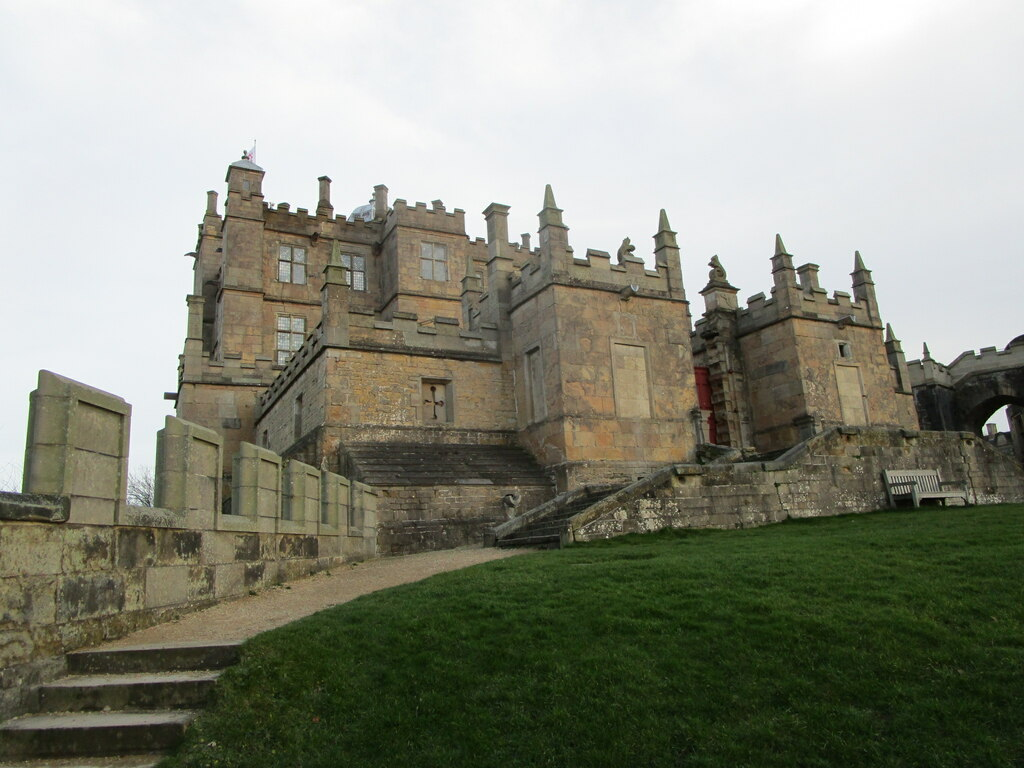
The west front of the Little Castle

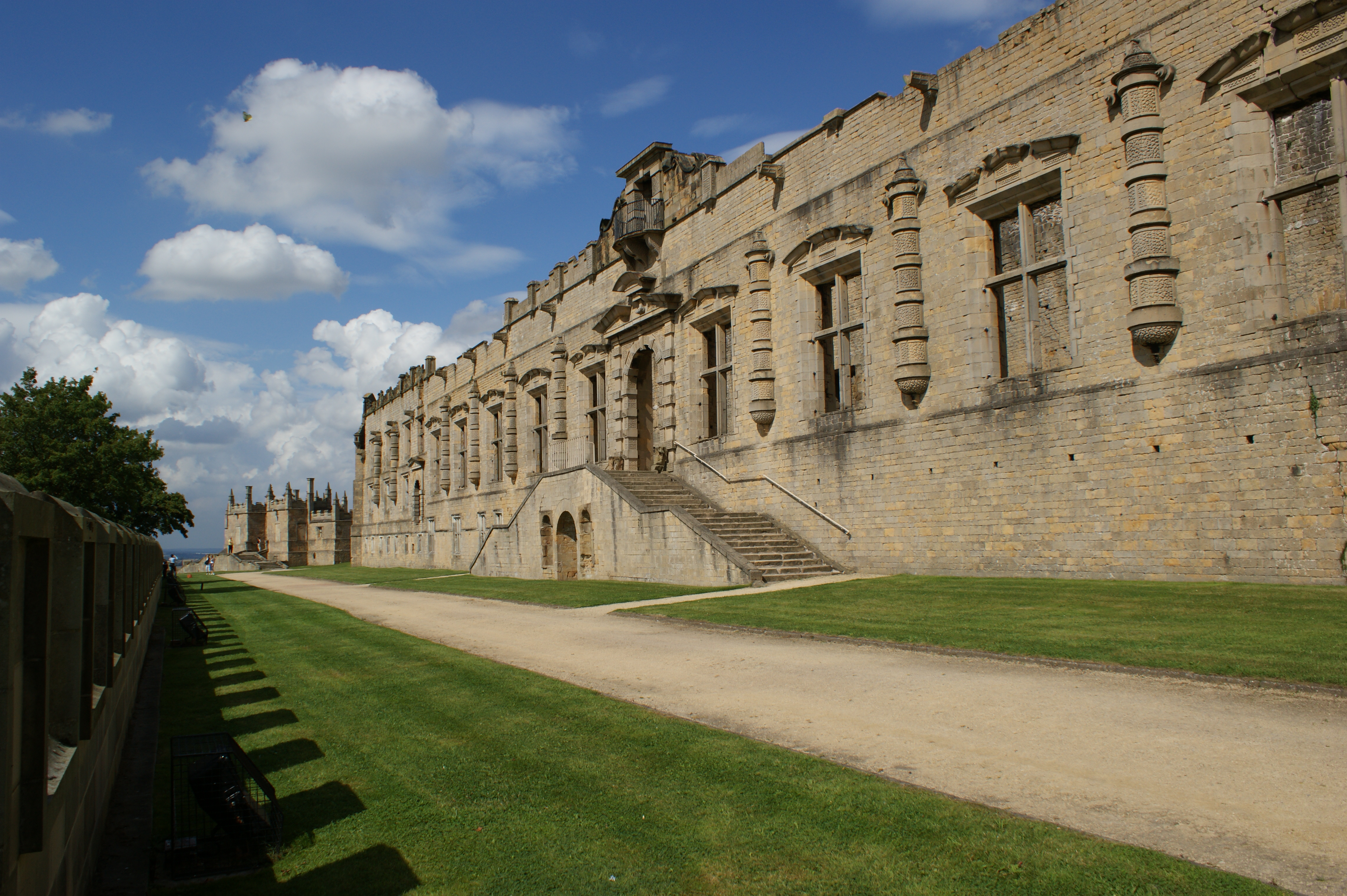
The exterior of the Long Gallery

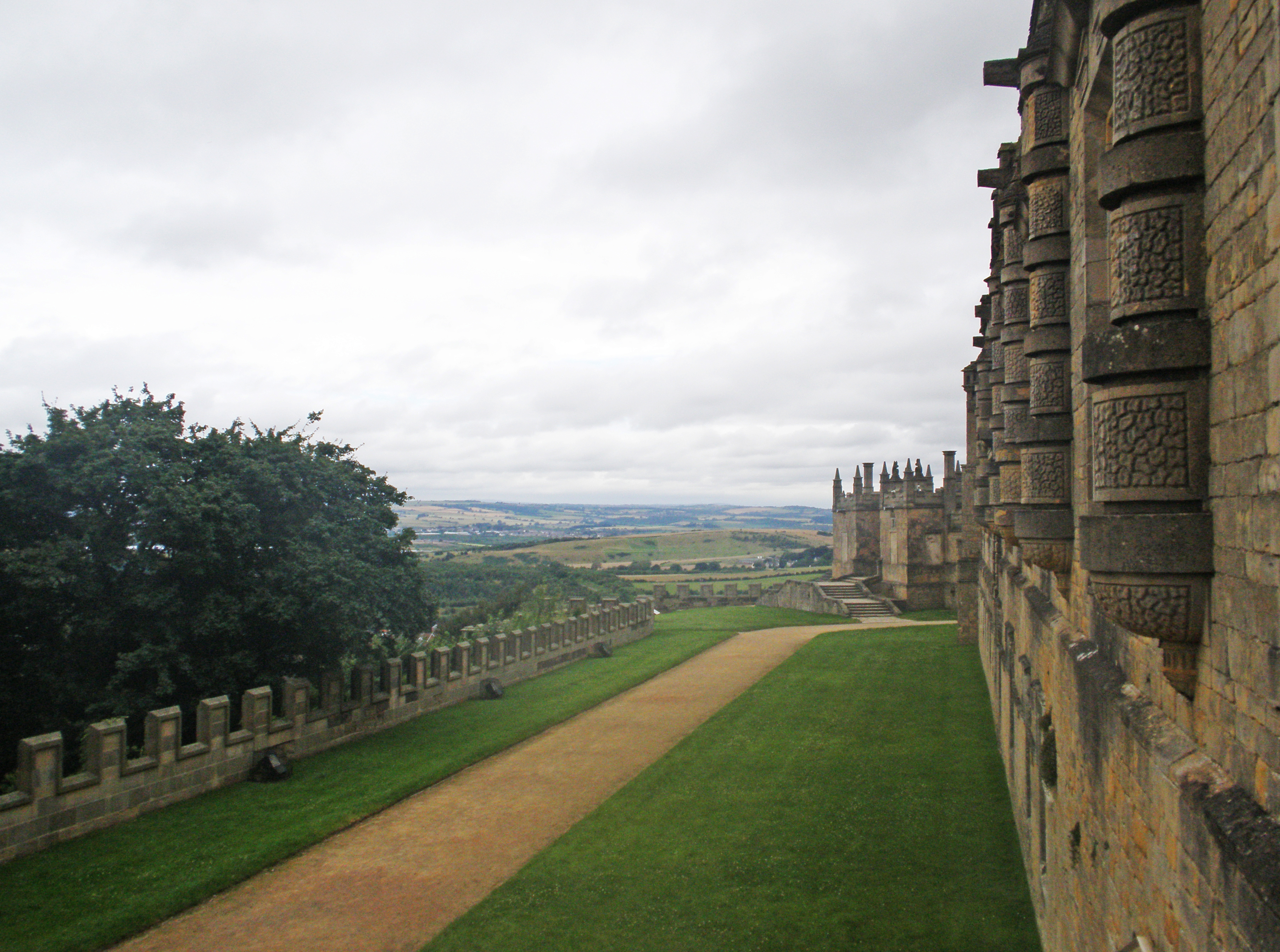
Expansive view from the Long Gallery
