= 2nd Earl of Derby =

2nd Earl of Derby may refer to:

- Robert de Ferrers, 2nd Earl of Derby (died 1162), English nobleman
- John of Gaunt (1340–1399), previously the Earl of Derby, English nobleman and member of the House of Plantagenet
- Thomas Stanley, 2nd Earl of Derby (before 1485–1521), English nobleman, politician, and peer
