= 1st Earl of Derby =

The Earl of Derby is a title that has been created thrice in British history. The first Earl may refer to:

- Robert de Ferrers, 1st Earl of Derby (1062–1139), English nobleman
- Henry of Grosmont, 1st Duke of Lancaster (c. 1310–1361), previously the Earl of Derby, English diplomat, politician, and soldier
- Thomas Stanley, 1st Earl of Derby (1435–1504), English nobleman and politician
