= Robert de Ferrers, 6th Earl of Derby =

English nobleman

- Arms of Robert de Ferrers, 6th Earl of Derby: Vairy or and gules.
- Born: 1239; Tutbury Castle
- Died: 1279 (aged 39–40)
- Occupation: English nobleman
- Spouse(s): Mary de Lusignan and Eleanor de Bohun
- Children: John and Eleanor
- Parent(s): William de Ferrers, 5th Earl of Derby and Margaret de Quincy

Robert de Ferrers, 6th Earl of Derby (1239–1279) was an English nobleman.

He was born at Tutbury Castle in Staffordshire, England, the son of William de Ferrers, 5th Earl of Derby, by his second wife Margaret de Quincy (born 1218), a daughter of Roger de Quincy, 2nd Earl of Winchester and Helen of Galloway.

== Early years ==
In 1249, at the age of 10, he married the seven-year-old Mary (or Marie), daughter of Hugh XI of Lusignan Count of La Marche, the eldest of Henry III's half-brothers, at Westminster Abbey. This arranged marriage is an indication of Henry's high regard for Robert's father. William died in 1254, so Robert became a knight and inherited the title while he was still a minor. He and his estates became a ward of Prince Edward. In 1257, Edward sold the wardship to the queen and Peter of Savoy for 6000 marks, which might have been a source of the later antipathy of Ferrers for the prince.

== Inheritance ==
Robert came of age in 1260 and took possession of the vast estates he inherited. The first of these passed to him from his Norman ancestors, a large part of Derbyshire that included the area later known as Duffield Frith, together with parts of Staffordshire and Nottinghamshire. In addition, he received Chartley Castle in Staffordshire, and all Lancashire between the Ribble and the Mersey. This came from the estate of Ranulph de Blondeville, 4th Earl of Chester, whose sister, Robert's grandfather had married. By careful management, the estate had become worth around £1500, which meant that the Ferrers family was among the wealthiest in the country.

However, the estate was crippled by charges arising from William's death. Firstly a third of its worth was accounted for by his mother's dower, which included the major asset of Chartley. Nearly half was supporting a debt of around £800 incurred by his father, which the exchequer was calling in. To pay this he had taken a further loan, possibly from Jewish financiers in Worcester. Finally, there was provision for his brother William and his wife Mary, who held two manors herself. It would seem that before taking his inheritance his only income had been the maritagium bestowed by King Henry.

== Baronial unrest ==
Unlike his predecessors, Robert was impetuous and violent, in part, perhaps, because he had inherited a severe form of gout from his grandfather. He was also unreliable and lacking in political sophistication. Almost as soon as he took control of his estate, he attacked the priory of Tutbury, which his family were patrons of.

In the early years, Robert had taken little interest in politics, perhaps because of his preoccupation with the estate. Nevertheless, he was acquainted with the reforms that were being pursued, and with Richard de Clare, Earl of Gloucester, and Simon de Montfort, friends of the family.

When Montfort returned to England in 1263 to begin a rebellion against King Henry III that became known as the Second Barons' War, Robert had to take sides, and moved towards Montfort. He is on record during May and June as taking the 'Three Castles'—Grosmont, Skenfrith, and Whitecastle in South Wales, which belonged to Prince Edward. When in January 1264, Louis IX of France declared the Provisions of Oxford unlawful and invalid, further unrest followed.

Robert first attacked Worcester in February 1264, sacking the Jewish quarter, plundering the religious and private houses, and damaging the fences and lands of the Royal parks in the neighbourhood. He carried away the bonds recording his loans, effectively ameliorating his debt problem. He then went on to join Simon de Montfort's forces at Gloucester Castle, recently taken by Edward. To Robert's extreme annoyance, Edward escaped, having made a truce with Henry de Montfort, Simon's son. It would seem that the motives of Ferrers were less about support for reform than they were about hatred of Edward.

The origins of this may well have been in the Ferrers family's long-held claims on the estate of Peverel Castle through the marriage of Margaret Peverel to Robert the second earl. King John had assigned stewardship of the estate to the fourth earl, Robert's grandfather, but King Henry had taken it back and awarded it to Prince Edward. Finally there was Edward's custodianship during Robert's minority and the fact that some land had not been relinquished. Be that as it may, Robert of Gloucester observed that "Of no one was Edward more afraid."

Edward's brief escape, however, allowed him, to attack Northampton Castle where Ferrers' brother William, Anker de Frescheville, Lord of Crich and Baldwin Wake, Lord of Chesterfield were taken prisoner in March 1264. Edward went on to attack Ferrers at Chartley Castle, and later to destroy Tutbury Castle. This was followed by the Battle of Lewes in May. That Robert did not join Montfort there would support the idea that his activities were largely motivated by self-interest.

Prince Edward and the king having finally been captured gave Ferrers his opportunity, to gain the royal castles of Bolsover, Horston, and Tickhill, in Yorkshire. By the end of 1264, he had also taken Peverel and, it is believed, Chester Castles.

== Retribution ==
Montfort's Parliament of 1265 broadened elected representation beyond the nobility to freeholder groups. Some of the Barons felt that he had gone too far and he began to lose support. Meanwhile, Edward continued under house arrest, and Montfort was working out an agreement for his release that included the surrender of large portions of his lands.

That these were lands that Ferrers had appropriated made Montfort a new and dangerous adversary. Montfort summoned Ferrers to the session of Parliament for January 1265, ordered him to surrender Peverel Castle, and accused him of "divers trespasses", after which he had him arrested and sent to the Tower of London.

J. R. Maddicott, writing in the Oxford Dictionary of National Biography, suggests that:

The summons to a parliament that otherwise comprised only staunch Montfortians was an almost blatant device to remove Derby from the scene of his triumphs and to open his lands, new and old, to a Montfortian takeover ... It is a mark of Earl Robert's characteristic lack of political cunning that he fell into the trap, with predictable results. ... Derby's removal was essential to Montfort's territorial ambitions, and that it could be accomplished without much risk because the earl's violent self-seeking had left him friendless

== Rebellion once more ==
Meanwhile, Montfort was steadily losing support and, in May, the Earl of Gloucester deserted to the side of the King. With his assistance, and that of Roger de Mortimer, Edward escaped from Kenilworth Castle. When he defeated Montfort at the Battle of Evesham in August 1265, the rebels were shown little mercy.

In spite of Ferrers's activities against Prince Edward's estates, his support in the North Midlands was potentially useful to King Henry, as was his money. Ferrers was released and, on paying 1500 marks, was given a pardon, his inheritance was secured, and mediation arranged in his quarrel with Prince Edward.

Far from accepting his good fortune, in 1266 he joined a number of previous Montfortian supporters, including Baldwin de Wake, lord of Chesterfield, in a fresh rebellion. Initially, it would seem that the rebels gathered at Ferrers's substantial Duffield Castle. However, from Tutbury, the royalist army, under Prince Henry, a nephew of Henry III, bypassed Duffield and proceeded to Chesterfield to intercept a force from the North under John d'Ayville.

Robert was, therefore, compelled to move northwards, crossing the River Amber, which was then flooded, reaching Chesterfield on 15 May 1266, just as d'Ayville arrived from Dronfield. In what has come to be known as the Battle of Chesterfield, they engaged the Royal forces in battle and were defeated. One account suggests that they were surprised in their quarters and most of them were killed. Other accounts suggest that Ferrers himself managed to take Chesterfield but was left exposed by the defeat of the other participants. Most of them withdrew into the forest where they lived as outlaws for two years. Ferrers was taken prisoner, some accounts suggesting that he was taken while having treatment for his gout, some that he was in hiding and was betrayed.

Robert was captured, attainted of high treason, and imprisoned in Windsor Castle until 1269. Duffield Castle was pulled down and Henry's second son, Edmund, was given possession of his lands and goods.

However, the Dictum of Kenilworth, issued in October 1266, provided that Ferrers could reclaim his lands in return for a redemption payment of seven times their annual value. They were returned at Windsor in 1269, with a debt of £50,000 to be paid to Edmund by 9 July.

Although the chances of Robert finding such a sum were remote, Edmund and his associates made their position more secure by a move that was unlikely to have been intended by those who drafted the Dictum of Kenilworth. Ferrers was taken to the manor of Cippenham, Buckinghamshire, the property of Richard, earl of Cornwall. There, in the presence of John Chishall, the chancellor, he was required to assign the lands to twelve manucapters

He was kept imprisoned at Richard of Cornwall's Wallingford Castle until the end of May and on 9 July the estate was transferred to Edmund. In the time it would provide a considerable part of the revenues of the Duchy of Lancaster, while Ferrers was left virtually landless and deprived of his title.

== Declining years ==
Ferrers lived on for another ten years, during which he attempted to regain his estates, with little success, largely because the machinations at Cippenham had been quietly supported by the King and his council. Edmund, in any case, was absent at the crusades until 1273 and no legal redress could be sought.

Soon after Edmund's return, Ferrers seized his old Chartley Castle by force, but was soon ejected. He then took a more considered approach, enlisting the help of Gilbert de Clare, Earl of Gloucester. In 1274, when Edward, now King, returned to England, Ferrers pleaded that he had accepted the Kenilworth ruling, with its seven years' redemption period, but that Edmund had refused. Edmund's defence was the Cippenham 'agreement' and Ferrers's failure to meet its terms. Ferrers argued that the 'agreement' was made under duress, but it was held that chancellor Chishall's presence at the signing gave it full legal validity.

Ferrers's case was dismissed and, although in 1275, he was able to recover his manor at Chartley (but not the castle), it marked the end of the great position of what had been one of England's most powerful families.

His final years were spent in the company of his family. His first wife, Mary, had died sometime between 1266 and 1269, and the marriage had been childless. He married (2nd) 26 June 1269 Eleanor, daughter of Humphrey de Bohun, Knt., of Kimbolton, Huntingdonshire, and Eleanor de Braose, and granddaughter of Humphrey de Bohun, 2nd Earl of Hereford. Until 1275, when he recovered Chartley, the family appeared to have lived on his mother's dower lands in Northamptonshire. The couple had two children: John born at Cardiff, Wales 20 June 1271 (who later became 1st Baron Ferrers of Chartley), and Eleanor, wife of Robert Fitz Walter, Knt., 1st Lord Fitz Walter.

Sir Robert de Ferrers, sometime Earl of Derby, died shortly before 27 April 1279, and was buried at St Thomas's Priory at Stafford, in Staffordshire. In Michaelmas term 1279 his widow, Eleanor, sued Edmund the king's brother for dower in a third of Tutbury, Scropton, Rolleston, Marchington, Calyngewode, Uttoxeter, Adgeresley, and Newborough, Staffordshire, and Duffield, Spondon, Chatesdene, and nine other vills named in Derbyshire, as well as other prominent landowners including Henry de Grenley (see Grindlay family); Edmund appeared in court and stated he held nothing in Spondon or Chatesdene, and as regards the rest Eleanor had no claim to dower in them, because neither at the time Robert had married her nor any time afterwards had he been seised of them. About 1280, Eleanor petitioned the king for the restoration of the manor of Chartley, Staffordshire, stating it was part of the inheritance of her son, John de Ferrers, who is underage and in the king's keeping. In 1284 she sued Thomas de Bray in a plea regarding custody of the land and heir of William le Botiller. In 1286 a commission was appointed by the king to investigate the persons who hunted and carried away deer and felled and carried away trees in the park of Eleanor late the wife of Robert de Ferrers at Chartley, Staffordshire. In 1290 she and her brother, Humphrey de Bohun, Earl of Hereford, acknowledged they owed a debt of £200 to Robert de Tibetot and Matthew de Columbers, the king's butler. Eleanor, Countess of Derby, died on 20 February 1313/4, and was buried at Walden Abbey, Essex.

== Notes ==
Peerage of England
Preceded by William III de Ferrers	Earl of Derby; 1254–1279	Extinct
