= Peverell (disambiguation) =

Peverell is a neighbourhood of Plymouth in the English county of Devon.

Peverell may also refer to:

== People ==
- Andrew Peverell, MP for Sussex, 1351–1377
- John Peverell (born 1941), English professional footballer
- Nicky Peverell (born 1973), English footballer
- Thomas Peverel or Peverell (died 1419), Bishop of Llandaff and Worcester
- William Peverel or Peverell (c.1040–c.1115), Norman knight

== Other uses ==
- Peverell brothers, three brothers in the Harry Potter novels
- Peverell Park, a cricket ground in Plymouth, Devon, England

== See also ==
- Peverel (disambiguation)
- Peverill, a surname and given name
- Ben Peverall (born 1992), English cricket umpire
- John Peverall (1931–2009), British film producer and director
