= William de Ferrers, 3rd Earl of Derby =

English earl and Knight Templar

William de Ferrers
- Earl of Derby
- Died: 1190; Acre (present-day Israel)
- Residence: Tutbury Castle, Staffordshire
- Spouse: Sybil de Braose
- Issue: William de Ferrers, 4th Earl of Derby
- Father: Robert de Ferrers, 2nd Earl of Derby
- Mother: Margaret Peverel

William I de Ferrers, 3rd Earl of Derby (died 1190) was a 12th-century English earl who resided in Tutbury Castle in Staffordshire and was head of a family which controlled a large part of Derbyshire known as Duffield Frith. He was also a Knight Templar.

William was the son of Robert de Ferrers, 2nd Earl of Derby, and his wife, Margaret Peverel. He succeeded his father as Earl of Derby in 1162. He married Sybil, the daughter of William de Braose, 3rd Lord of Bramber, and Bertha of Hereford.

== Life ==
William de Ferrers was one of the earls who joined the rebellion against King Henry II of England led by Henry's eldest son, Henry the Younger, in the Revolt of 1173–1174, sacking the town of Nottingham. Robert de Ferrers II, his father, had supported Stephen of England and, although Henry II had accepted him at court, he had denied the title of Earl of Derby to him and his son. In addition, William had a grudge against Henry because he believed he should have inherited the lands of Peveril Castle through his mother. These, King Henry had previously confiscated in 1155 when William Peverel fell into disfavour.

With the failure of the revolt, de Ferrers was taken prisoner by King Henry at Northampton on 31 July 1174, along with the King of Scots and the earls of Chester and Lincoln, along with a number of his Derbyshire underlings and was held at Caen. He was deprived of his castles at Tutbury and Duffield and both were put out of commission (and possibly Pilsbury). In addition to defraying the costs of the war, Henry levied a so-called "forest fine" of 200 marks.

He seems to have afterwards regained the confidence of Henry II, and he showed his fidelity to the next sovereign, King Richard I, by accompanying him in his expedition to the Holy Land, and joining the Third Crusade and died at the Siege of Acre in 1190.

He was succeeded by his son William de Ferrers, 4th Earl of Derby.

William de Ferrars Preceptory No. 530 is a Knight Templar preceptory named after William de Ferrars. This preceptory is stationed in Burton upon Trent.

== Sources ==
- Crouch, David (2010). "The Complaint of King John against William de Briouze (c. September 1210)". In Loengard, Janet S. (ed.). Magna Carta and the England of King John. The Boydell Press. pp. 168–180. ISBN 9781843835486.
- Keats-Rohan, K. S. B. (2002). Domesday Descendants: A Prosopography of Persons Occurring in English Documents 1066-1166. Vol. II: Pipe Rolls to Cartae Baronum. The Boydell Press. ISBN 9780851158631.

Peerage of England
Preceded by Robert II de Ferrers	Earl of Derby; 1162–1190	Succeeded by William II de Ferrers
