= William de Ferrers, 4th Earl of Derby =

English earl (c. 1168 – c. 1247)

The Right Honourable William de Ferrers
- Earl of Derby
- Tenure: 1190–1247
- Predecessor: William de Ferrers, 3rd Earl of Derby
- Successor: William de Ferrers, 5th Earl of Derby
- Born: c. 1168
- Died: c. 1247
- Spouse: Alice of Chester
- Issue: William de Ferrers, 5th Earl of Derby; Sir Thomas de Ferrers; Sir Hugh de Ferrers; Robert de Ferrers.; Ranulph de Ferrers; Bertha de Ferrers; Agnes de Ferrers; Sybil de Ferrers

William II de Ferrers, 4th Earl of Derby (c. 1168 – c. 1247), was a favourite of King John of England. He succeeded to the estate (but not the title) upon the death of his father, William de Ferrers, 3rd Earl of Derby, at the Siege of Acre in 1190. He was head of a family which controlled a large part of Derbyshire which included an area known as Duffield Frith.

== Life ==
He adopted his father's allegiance to King Richard as the reigning king. On Richard's return from the Third Crusade, in the company of David Ceannmhor and the Earl of Chester he played a leading role in besieging Nottingham Castle, on 28 March 1194, which was being held by supporters of Prince John. For seven weeks after this, he held the position of Sheriff of Nottinghamshire and Derbyshire.

On the accession of John after the death of his brother, in 1199, William gave him his allegiance, and became a great favourite. He restored to the de Ferrars' family the title of Earl of Derby, along with the right to the "third penny", and soon afterwards bestowed upon him the manors of Ashbourne and Wirksworth, with the whole of that wapentake, subject to a fee farm rent of £70 per annum.

When, in 1213, John surrendered his kingdoms of England and Ireland to the Pope, William was one of the witnesses to the "Bulla Aurea." In the following year, William gave surety on behalf of the king for the payment of a yearly tribute of 1,000 marks.

In the same year, 1214, the King granted the Earl the royal castle of Harestan (Horsley Castle). William was a patron of at least two abbeys and four priories. In 1216, John made him bailiff of the Peak Forest and warden of the Peak Castle.

In that year, John was succeeded by the nine-year-old Henry III. Because of continuing discontent about John's violations of the Magna Carta, some of the barons approached Prince Louis of France who invaded in that year. William Marshal, 1st Earl of Pembroke acting on behalf of the young King sought to repel the invaders and pacify the barons. His forces, with the assistance of de Ferrers, the Earl of Chester and others, defeated the rebels at the siege of Lincoln.

De Ferrers was allowed to retain the royal castles of Bolsover, Peak and Horston (Horsley) until the King's 14th birthday. The latter had been given to him in 1215 as a residence for his wife, during his planned absence with the King on Crusade. and the Earl was among those who made representation to the King, which would in 1258 lead to the Provisions of Oxford.

Henry reached his fourteenth birthday in 1222 and his administration sought to recover the three royal castles, to de Ferrers' indignation. In 1254 they would pass to Edward I, Henry's son, exacerbating Robert's, the sixth earl, resentment against the prince.

In 1223 King Henry III granted William with the "castle of Lancaster with the county and honour of Lancaster". They would be lost to the crown in the rebellion of his grandson Robert in 1267.

William was one of those nobles who were jealous of the rising power of the king's favourites. In 1227 he was one of the earls who rose against the king on behalf of his brother Richard and made him restore the forest charters, and in 1237 he was one of the three counsellors forced on the king by the barons. His influence had by this time been further increased by the death, in 1232, of the earl of Chester, whose sister, his wife, inherited a vast estate between the Ribble and the Mersey.

William was married to Alice of Chester, sister of Ranulph de Blondeville, 4th Earl of Chester, for 55 years. As the Earl advanced in years he became a martyr to severe attacks of the gout, a disease which terminated his life in the year 1247. He was succeeded by his elder son, also William, the Fifth Earl of Derby.

== William de Ferrers School ==
William de Ferrers School and Sixth form is a "foundation comprehensive" (state-funded, non-selective, with some control over how to spend its allotted money) school in the rural town of South Woodham Ferrers, Essex. The school is named after William Ferrers a descendant of Henry de Ferrers who was given the area as a gift from William the Conqueror after the Norman Conquest.

== William De Ferrers Football Club ==
Henry Ferrers' descendant gave his name to the local Essex (UK) football team of the same name, often abbreviated to Willy De or known simply as The Baby blues. The club was founded in 1983 and currently has 3 senior men’s teams.

== Family and children ==
William and Alice had:

1. William de Ferrers, 5th Earl of Derby
2. Sir Thomas de Ferrers, of Chartley Ferrers.
3. Sir Hugh de Ferrers, of Bugbrooke, Northamptonshire, died shortly before 10 August 1257. He married a sister of Roger de Mohaut, Steward of Chester. They had one daughter, Cecily de Ferrers, wife of John de Oddingseles and Godfrey de Beaumont, Knt., of Drayton and Scarning, Norfolk, Grimston, Suffolk, etc. See Willis, Estate Book of Henry de Bray (c.1289–1340) (Camden 3rd Ser. 27) (1916): 19–20.
4. Robert de Ferrers.
5. Ranulph de Ferrers, parson of St. Michael’s on the Wyre, Lancashire.
6. Bertha de Ferrers, married (1st) Thomas de Furnival, of Worksop, Nottinghamshire, and Sheffield, Yorkshire; (2nd) Ralph le Bigod, Knt., of Settrington, Yorkshire.
7. Agnes de Ferrers, married Richard de Montfitchet.
8. Sybil de Ferrers, married Sir John de Vipont, of Appleby and Brough under Stainmoor, Westmorland.

== Sources ==
- Gee, Loveday Lewes (2002). Women, Art and Patronage from Henry III to Edward III: 1216-1377. Boydell Press.

Peerage of England
Preceded by William I de Ferrers	Earl of Derby; 1190–1247	Succeeded by William III de Ferrers
