= John de Ferrers, 1st Baron Ferrers of Chartley =

John de Ferrers, 1st Baron Ferrers of Chartley (20 June 1271 Cardiff – 1312) was the son of Robert de Ferrers, 6th Earl of Derby and Alianore de Bohun, daughter of Humphrey de Bohun and Eleanor de Braose, and granddaughter of Humphrey de Bohun, 2nd Earl of Hereford. He was both Seneschal of Gascony and Lieutenant of Aquitaine in 1312, the year of his death.

Ferrers joined the baronial opposition to King Edward I in 1297, but was summoned as a baron in 1299.

He married Hawise de Muscegros, a daughter of Robert de Muscegros.

Their eldest son John (died by 1324) inherited the title Baron Ferrers of Chartley upon his father's death from poisoning in Gascony in 1312.

Peerage of England
New creation	Baron Ferrers of Chartley; 1299–1312	Succeeded by John de Ferrers
