= Peveril =

Peveril may refer to:

== People ==
- Peveril William-Powlett (1898–1985), Royal Navy officer who went on to be Commander-in-Chief, South Atlantic Station
- Peveril Meigs (1903–1979), American geographer, notable for his studies of arid lands on several continents

== Fiction ==
- Peveril of the Peak, the longest novel by the author Sir Walter Scott

== Places ==
- Peveril Castle, a ruined early medieval castle overlooking the village of Castleton in the English county of Derbyshire
- Peveril Point, a promontory and part of the town of Swanage in Dorset, England
- Peveril (Greenland), a peak in the Stauning Alps
- Peveril Bilateral School, former name of Nottingham Girls' Academy, a secondary school and sixth form with academy status
- Peveril, a hamlet within the municipality of Sainte-Justine-de-Newton, Quebec, Canada
- Peveril of the Peak (pub), a pub in Manchester, England

== Ships ==
The Isle of Man Steam Packet Company named four of its ships Peveril. All operated on the Irish Sea.

- SS Peveril (1884) A 595-ton, twin-screw packet steamer. She sank following a collision with SS Monarch in 1899.
- SS Peveril (1929) A 798-ton, cargo ship which was sold and scrapped in 1964
- MV Peveril (1963) A 1,048-ton, motor cargo vessel, which was sold in 1981 and scrapped in 2001.
- MV Peveril (1971) A 1,950-ton, ro-ro cargo ferry, which was sold in 2000 and scrapped in 2009.

== Locomotives ==
- No. 6 Peveril A 2-4-0 locomotive, built by Beyer-Peacock, Gorton, Manchester, in 1875 for service with the Isle of Man Railway

== See also ==
- Club Sandwich at the Peveril Hotel, final release by the group Six by Seven
- Peverill, a surname and given name
