= Margaret Peverell, Countess of Derby =

Countess of Derby

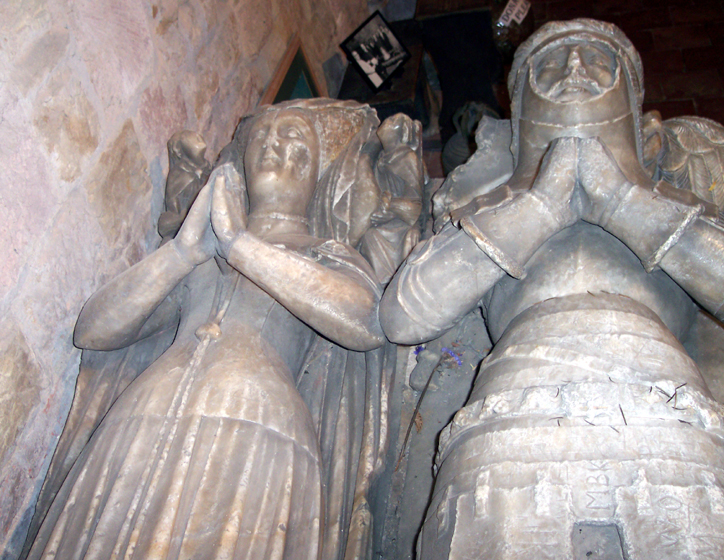
Margaret's effigy in Merevale Abbey

Margaret Peverell, Countess of Derby (b. circa 1114, Nottinghamshire, England), was an English noblewoman.

== Family and marriage ==
Peverell was the daughter of William Peverel the Younger of Peveril Castle in Derbyshire.

According to Burke's Dormant, Abeyant, Forfeited and Extinct Peerages, Peverell married Robert de Ferrers, 2nd Earl of Derby and thus became Countess of Derby. She was the mother of William de Ferrers, 3rd Earl of Derby and William De Ferrers, Lord of Eggington and a daughter, Petronella.

Peverell died in 1154 and was buried in Merevale Abbey.
