= Honour of Peverel =

Geographic area in the north of England

Coordinates: 53.231°N 1.297°W

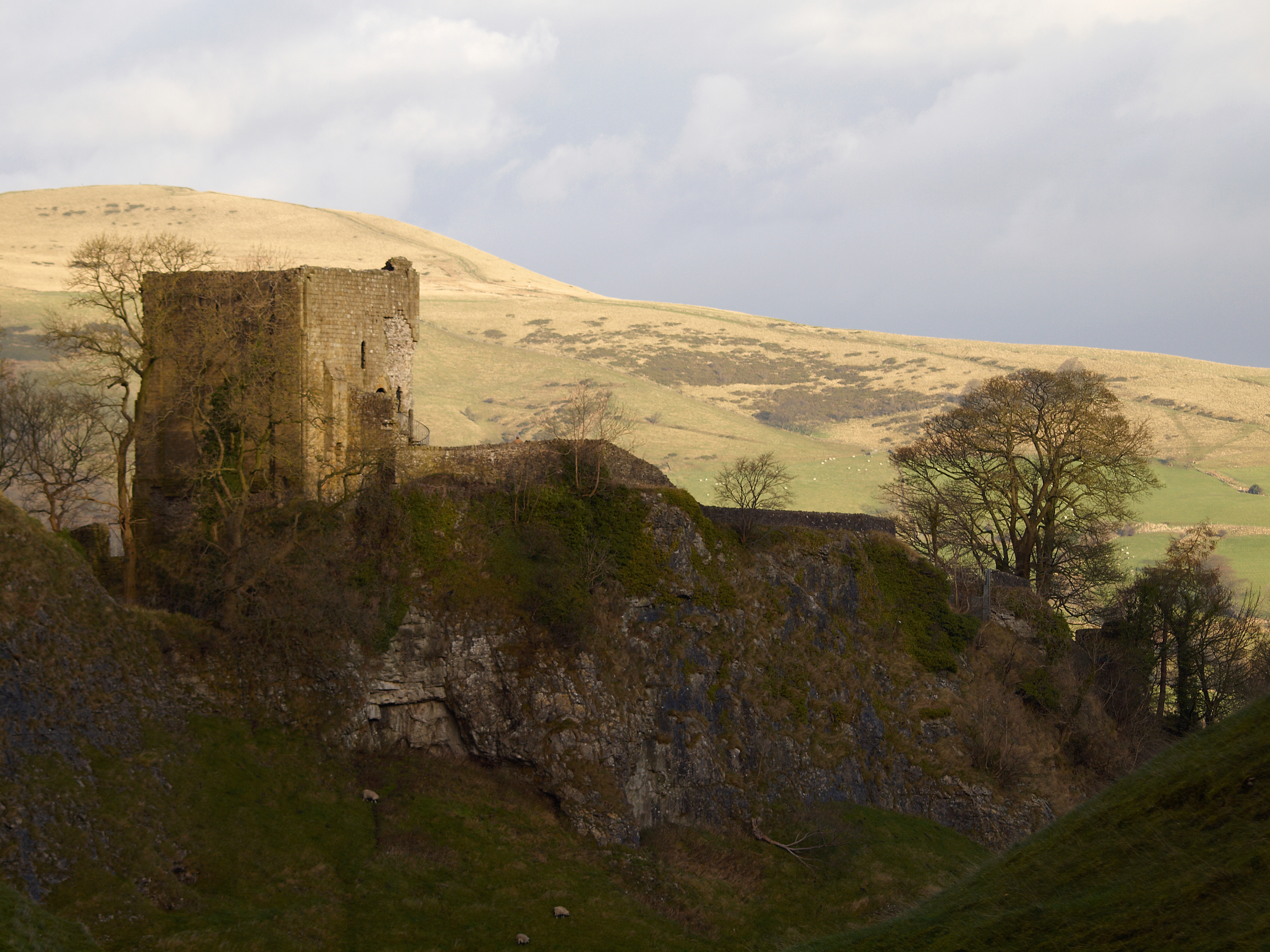
Peveril Castle (also known as Castleton Castle or Peak Castle), formerly the caput of the Honour of Peverel, now a ruined late medieval castle overlooking the village of Castleton in Derbyshire

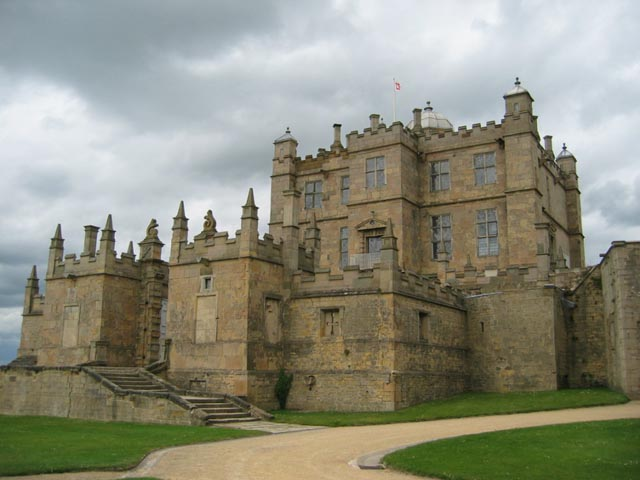
Bolsover Castle

The Honour of Peverel (also known as the Feudal Barony of the Peak) is a geographic area in the north of England comprising part of the historic feudal barony held by the Norman Peverel family. The honour was granted to William Peverel (c. 1050 – c. 1115) by William the Conqueror.

The Honour is recorded in the Domesday Book of 1086, and consisted of substantial lands comprising 162 manors including:

- Bolsover Castle - which became the seat of the Peverel family
- Nottingham Castle
- Codnor Castle
- Pinxton
- Duston
- Peveril Castle in Castleton, Derbyshire
- Glapwell
- Eastwood, Nottinghamshire
- Langar Hall

William Peverel's son, William Peverel the Younger, inherited the honour, but, accused of treason by King Henry II, forfeited it, and the king then passed it to Ranulph de Gernon, 2nd Earl of Chester, who died before he could take possession.

== In literature ==
The story of the Peverels formed the background to the historical novel Peveril of the Peak, by Sir Walter Scott, set in the 17th century, and published in 1823.
