= Robert de Ferrers, 1st Earl of Derby =

Norman noble

The Right Honourable Robert de Ferrers
- Earl of Derby
- Tenure: 1138–1139
- Predecessor: New creation
- Successor: Robert de Ferrers, 2nd Earl of Derby
- Father: Henry de Ferrers
- Mother: Bertha

Robert I de Ferrers, 1st Earl of Derby (c. 1068 – 1139) was born in Derbyshire, England, a younger son of Henry de Ferrières and his wife Bertha (perhaps l'Aigle). His father, born in Ferrières, Normandy, France accompanied William the Conqueror during his invasion of England. The family was rewarded with a grant of Tutbury Castle in Staffordshire and 114 manors in Derbyshire.

Robert's elder brother William's main interests were in France. He joined Robert Curthose and was captured at Tinchebray. His other brother Engenulf died shortly after his father and so Robert succeeded to the estates in 1088.

From the beginning, he gave great support to Henry I. As part of his tenure of Duffield Frith in 1129–30, he is on record as having interests in lead mines at Wirksworth. At about this time he granted the church of Potterspury, Northamptonshire, to Bernard the Scribe.

It is, however, during his last years that he is most in evidence as a leading supporter of King Stephen. He took a large body of Derbyshire men northwards to assist in repelling an invasion of the Scots under King David I of Scotland, nominally on the behalf of Matilda. Little actual fighting took place, but Thurstan, Archbishop of York, won the Battle of the Standard on Stephen's behalf, fought near Northallerton, on 22 August 1138.

Robert was mainly instrumental in securing the victory for his Sovereign, who for this and other important services created him Earl of Derby, although charters and chronicles during this period refer to him interchangeably as Earl of Ferrers, Earl of Nottingham or Earl of Derby.

He died in the following year (1139) and was succeeded in his earldom by his second but eldest surviving son Robert de Ferrers, 2nd Earl of Derby, often known as Robert de Ferrers the Younger.

As with most Norman lords, the Ferrers brought their Norman underlords to England with them – in this case, the Curzon (of Kedleston), Livet (Levett) and Boscherville (Baskerville) families, who held their fiefs in Normandy from the Ferrers, and who subsequently held their English lands from Ferrers as well. (The undertenant family names derive from Notre-Dame-de-Courson, Livet-en-Ouche and Boscherville, all part of the Ferrers barony in Normandy.) These undertenants retained their ties to the Ferrers after the families had moved to England following the Norman Conquest.

Peerage of England
| New creation | Earl of Derby; 1138–1139 | Succeeded by Robert II de Ferrers |
