= William Peverel =

Norman knight granted lands in central England following the Norman Conquest

William Peverel (died 28 January 1114), Latinised to Gulielmus Piperellus), was a Norman knight granted lands in England following the Norman Conquest.

== Origins ==
Little is known of the origin of the William Peverel the Elder. Of his immediate family, only the name of a brother, Robert, is known.

The name Peverel is an Anglo-Norman variant form of the Old French surname Pevrel, Peuvrel diminutive form in -el of Pevrier, Peuvrier meaning "pepper or spice seller". It developed an epenthesis in Anglo-Norman which consists in this case of interposing an -e- between the v and the r. This phonetic feature is regularly observed in Anglo-Norman, for example: D'Évreux "of Évreux" > Devereux; French ouvrit vs AN overi; French oeuvre vs AN o(e)vere, etc. The medieval latinization Piperellus is correct, piper meaning "pepper" in English and is the source of Old French peivre > French poivre and Old English piper > English pepper. The diminutive suffix -ellus gave regularly -el in northern French, but later -eau in western and central French.

== Lands held in England ==
William Peverel was a favourite of William the Conqueror. He was greatly honoured after the Norman Conquest, and received as his reward over a hundred manors in central England from the king. In 1086, the Domesday Book records William as holding the substantial number of 162 manors, forming collectively the Honour of Peverel, in Nottinghamshire and Derbyshire, including Nottingham Castle. He also built Peveril Castle, Castleton, Derbyshire. William Peverel is amongst the people explicitly recorded in the Domesday Book as having built castles.

William possibly served as the Constable of Dover Castle very briefly following the death of Bertram Ashburnham during or after the Battle of Hastings. He would hold the position no later than 25 December 1066 as Odo of Bayeux became earl of Kent shortly after William the Conqueror's coronation.

William established the Lenton Priory, circa 1102-08.

== Marriage and children ==
William married Adeline, who bore him four children: two sons both named William, one dying childless, the other often called William Peverel the Younger, and two daughters, Maud and Adeliza, who married Richard de Redvers.
