= Horston Castle =

- Amber Valley, Derbyshire
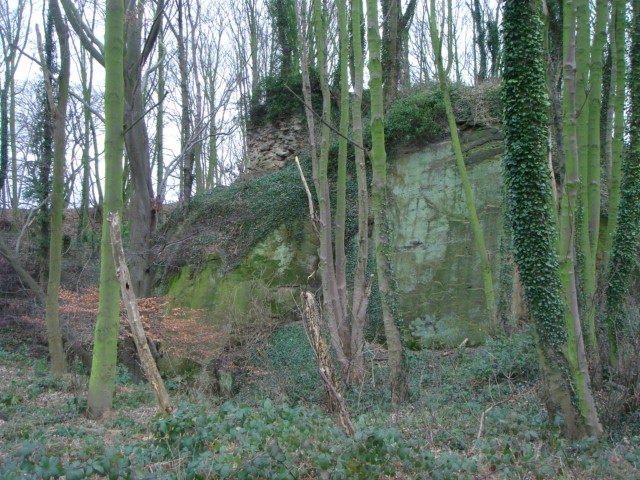
- Horston Castle (2007)

Site information
- Condition: ruined

Location
- Shown within Derbyshire.
- Coordinates: 52.98483°N 1.44288°W

Site history
- In use: C12-C14

Scheduled monument
- Official name: Horsley Castle tower keep castle
- Designated: 31 October 1962
- Reference no.: 1009293

Horston Castle (sometimes spelt Horeston and also known as Horsley Castle) is about 1 mile to the south of the village of Horsley, some 5 miles north of the English city of Derby (grid reference SK375432). The site is a Scheduled Ancient Monument but, as of 2018, is on Historic England's Heritage at Risk Register as poor condition.

It was a Norman motte and bailey castle which was founded by Ralph de Buron. In the 13th century King John built a stone castle, adding a keep, a chapel, a gatehouse and a barbican. In 1514 it was granted by Henry VIII to the Duke of Norfolk as a reward for services against the Scots. Later it came into the possession of the Stanhope family.

The castle is ruined today, damaged by extensive quarrying. There are visible remains of the keep although this is now largely overgrown.
