= Robert de Ferrers, 2nd Earl of Derby =

English noble (1100–1162)

- Born: c. 1100
- Died: 1162
- Noble family: de Ferrers
- Spouse: Margaret Peverel
- Issue: William de Ferrers, 3rd Earl of Derby; Walkelin de Ferrers; Petronilla
- Father: Robert de Ferrers, 1st Earl of Derby
- Mother: Hawise

Robert II de Ferrers, 2nd Earl of Derby (c. 1100 – 1162) was a younger, but eldest surviving son of Robert de Ferrers, 1st Earl of Derby and his wife Hawise. He succeeded his father as Earl of Derby in 1139 (William, his elder brother, having been murdered in London sometime before). He was head of a family which controlled a large part of Derbyshire including an area later known as Duffield Frith.

== Life ==
Little is known of Robert's life, other than his generosity to the church. In 1148, he established Merevale Abbey in Warwickshire, England, where he requested to be buried in an ox hide. He founded the Priory of Derby, which later moved to Darley Abbey, and its Abbot was granted many privileges in Duffield Forest and Chase.

Robert continued his father's attempts to play a role in the civil war commonly called The Anarchy that arose because of the contesting claims of Empress Matilda and Stephen of England. The family's support for Stephen led to him being awarded the revenues of the Borough of Derby in 1139, though in 1149 Stephen then granted the Borough to the Earl of Chester

He finally threw in his lot with the future Henry II after Tutbury Castle was besieged in 1153. However, when Henry came to the throne in 1154, he withdrew de Ferrers' right to use the title of Earl or to receive the "third penny" on the profits of the county.

Robert died prior to 1160.

== Family and death ==
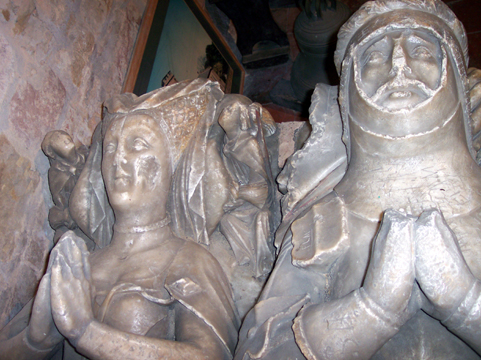
Margaret Peverel and Robert de Ferrers' effigy in Merevale Abbey

Around 1135, Robert married Margaret Peverell, daughter of William Peverel the Younger of Nottingham. They had:

- Isolde de Ferrers, married Stephen de Beauchamp
- William de Ferrers, 3rd Earl of Derby, who succeeded his father
- Robert de Ferrers

== Sources ==
- Keats-Rohan, K. S. B. (2002). Domesday Descendants: A Prosopography of Persons Occurring in English Documents 1066-1166. Vol. II: Pipe Rolls to Cartae Baronum. The Boydell Press. ISBN 9780851158631.
- Tetlow, Elisabeth Meier (2024). The Journey of a Knightly Family: The Hercy/Hersey Family 1000-1650. Wipf &Stock. ISBN 9798385226931.

Peerage of England
| Preceded by Robert I de Ferrers | Earl of Derby; 1139–1162 | Succeeded by William I de Ferrers |
