= Revolt of 1173–1174 =

Dynastic conflict in England and France

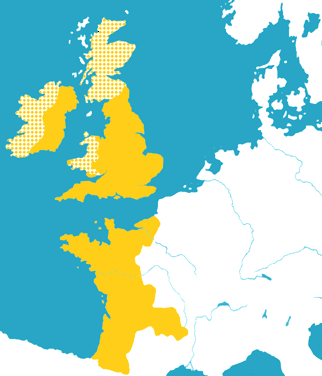
- Territory ruled by Henry II
Date	April 1173 – 30 September 1174
Location	England, Normandy, Southern Scotland, Brittany, Flanders
Result	Victory for Henry II: Rebels reconciled to Henry II; Treaty of Falaise between Henry II and William the Lion; Treaty of Mont Louis between Henry II, his sons, and liegemen
Territorial changes	Henry II maintains hold on his territories; Scottish castles, including Berwick and Edinburgh, transferred to Henry II

Belligerents
Angevin Empire	Rebels; Kingdom of France; Kingdom of Scotland; Duchy of Brittany; County of Flanders; County of Boulogne

Commanders and leaders
Henry II; Richard de Luci; Ranulf de Glanvill; Reginald de Dunstanville; William FitzRobert; William d'Aubigny; Humphrey III de Bohun; Geoffrey Fitzroy	Eleanor of Aquitaine (POW); Henry the Young King; Richard, Duke of Aquitaine; Geoffrey, Duke of Brittany; Robert de Beaumont (POW); William Marshal; Hugh Bigod; William de Ferrers (POW); Hugh de Kevelioc (POW); William the Lion (POW); David, Earl of Huntingdon; Louis VII of France; Philip I of Flanders; Matthew of Boulogne †

The Revolt of 1173–1174, sometimes referred to as the Great Revolt, was a rebellion against King Henry II of England led by three of his sons, his wife Eleanor of Aquitaine, and their supporters. The revolt lasted eighteen months and ended in failure; Henry's opponents were forced to submit and were ultimately reconciled with him.

== Background ==
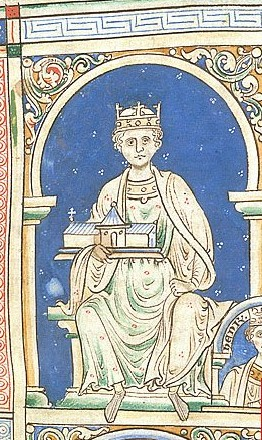
King Henry II

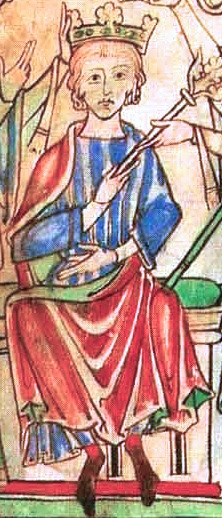
Henry the Young King

King Henry II had been ruling England, Normandy, and Anjou since 1154, while his wife Queen Eleanor ruled the vast territory of Aquitaine since 1137. In 1173 Henry had four legitimate sons (from oldest to youngest): Henry, called the "Young King", Richard (later called "the Lionheart"), Geoffrey, and John ("Lackland"), all of whom stood to inherit some or all of these possessions. Henry also had an illegitimate son, Geoffrey, born probably before the eldest of the legitimate children.

By this time, Henry the Young King was 18 years old and praised for his good looks and charm. He had recently married to Margaret of France who was the daughter of Louis VII of France, the former husband of Eleanor (Henry the Young King's mother). Henry the Young King kept a large and glamorous retinue but was constrained by his lack of resources: "he had many knights but he had no means to give rewards and gifts to the knights". The young Henry was therefore anxious to take control of some of his ancestral inheritances to rule in his own right.

A contributing factor was Henry II's decision to bequeath three castles in the province of Anjou, which were within the realm of the Young King's inheritance, to his youngest son, John, as part of the agreement for John's betrothal to Alice, the daughter of Humbert III, Count of Savoy.

In February 1173, Henry the Young King met with his father to ask for control of either the Kingdom of England or the Duchy of Normandy. Louis VII had earlier suggested that Henry make such a request, seeing it as an opportunity to pit England's ruler and heir apparent against each other. At this, Henry the Young King was encouraged to rebel by many aristocrats who saw potential profit and gain in a power transition. His mother Eleanor had been feuding with her husband. She joined the cause as did many others upset by Henry's possible involvement in the murder of Archbishop Thomas Becket in 1170, which had left Henry alienated throughout Christendom. The historian Michael Staunton described the revolt as "the greatest crisis of [Henry II's] career to date, more serious in its direct threat to his position than the murder of Thomas Becket". Eleanor's marriage to Henry was not one of much love, as Henry had engaged in extramarital affairs throughout their marriage. These affairs likely had Eleanor already on uneasy terms with Henry, with the killing of Becket being the last straw. According to historian Lindy Grant, "Henry had never been a faithful husband". While Eleanor's involvement was certainly hastened by the state of her marriage and the killing of Thomas Becket, there also was a political aspect of her decision to rise up against Henry. Eleanor had been duchess of Aquitaine for quite some time by the time of the revolt and had become more and more displeased with Henry's increasing overreach onto her lands. It was the culmination of these aforementioned grievances that led Eleanor, sensing an opportunity to get back at Henry through her son's rebellion, to finally rise up against her husband.

In March 1173 Henry the Young King withdrew to the court of his father-in-law, Louis, in Paris and was soon followed by his brothers Richard and Geoffrey with Eleanor's encouragement. Eleanor tried to join them but was stopped by Henry II on the way and imprisoned. She would remain in captivity until Henry II's death in 1189. The Young King and his French mentor created a wide alliance against Henry II by promising land and revenues in England and Anjou to the Counts of Flanders, Boulogne, and Blois; William the Lion, King of the Scots, would have lands in northern England that had previously been held by David I of Scotland and Malcolm IV of Scotland. In effect, the Young King would seize his inheritance by breaking it apart.

Amongst Henry II's subjects, four earls joined the rebellion: Hugh Bigod, 1st Earl of Norfolk; Hugh of Cyfeiliog, 5th Earl of Chester; Robert de Beaumont, 3rd Earl of Leicester; and William de Ferrers, 3rd Earl of Derby.

== Revolt ==
It was decided by Young Henry and his allies that Normandy would become the main focus of their war plans. Normandy was known as "linchpin of the Plantagenet empire", with the city of Rouen being the main target of the Normandy campaign, due to it being one of the most important administrative centers of the English holdings in France. If Young Henry could take and hold Normandy, it would split the empire in two and sever England from mainland France. Holding Normandy would also allow Young Henry to gather more men, money, and supplies to continue the rebellion and give him a major city from which to strike out of. Young Henry recognized that his father's forces in Normandy would be overstretched, while also dealing with small-scale, local rebellions, that he would be able to concentrate his forces onto key objectives within Normandy. The plan consisted of a three-pronged advance, where Ralph of Fougeres and Earl Hugh of Chester would move eastwards towards the Avranchin; Young Henry and Phillip of Flanders would advance from the north-east, and Louis would attack the south in the valley of Avre. Hostilities began in May when Henry the Young King led an attack on Pacy in Normandy. The Counts of Flanders and Boulogne invaded Normandy from the east, the King of France and young Henry from the south, while the Bretons attacked from the west. Each of the assaults ended with failure: the Count of Boulogne was killed, Louis was defeated and kicked out of Normandy, and the Bretons were routed with great loss of life and treasure. William the Lion's attacks in the north of England were also a failure. Negotiations were opened with the rebels in Normandy between father Henry II and son young Henry, to no avail.

The Earl of Leicester, a supporter of young Henry who had been in Normandy and was chief of the aristocratic rebels, took up the charge next. He raised an army of Flemish mercenaries and crossed from Normandy back to England to join the other rebel barons there, principally Hugh Bigod, Earl of Norfolk. The Earl of Leicester was intercepted by the English forces returning from the north in Scotland, led by Richard de Luci, and was completely defeated at Fornham. Henry II's barons supposedly said to him, "It is a bad year for your enemies." By September 1173 Henry II's successes against the rebels led to those based in mainland Europe to begin peace talks. On 25 September Henry II met with various rebel leaders, including his sons. Terms were proposed that would given Henry II's sons more income and greater control of castles and lands than before the war. The terms were rejected and the talks ended when the Earl of Leicester attempted to draw his sword on Henry II.

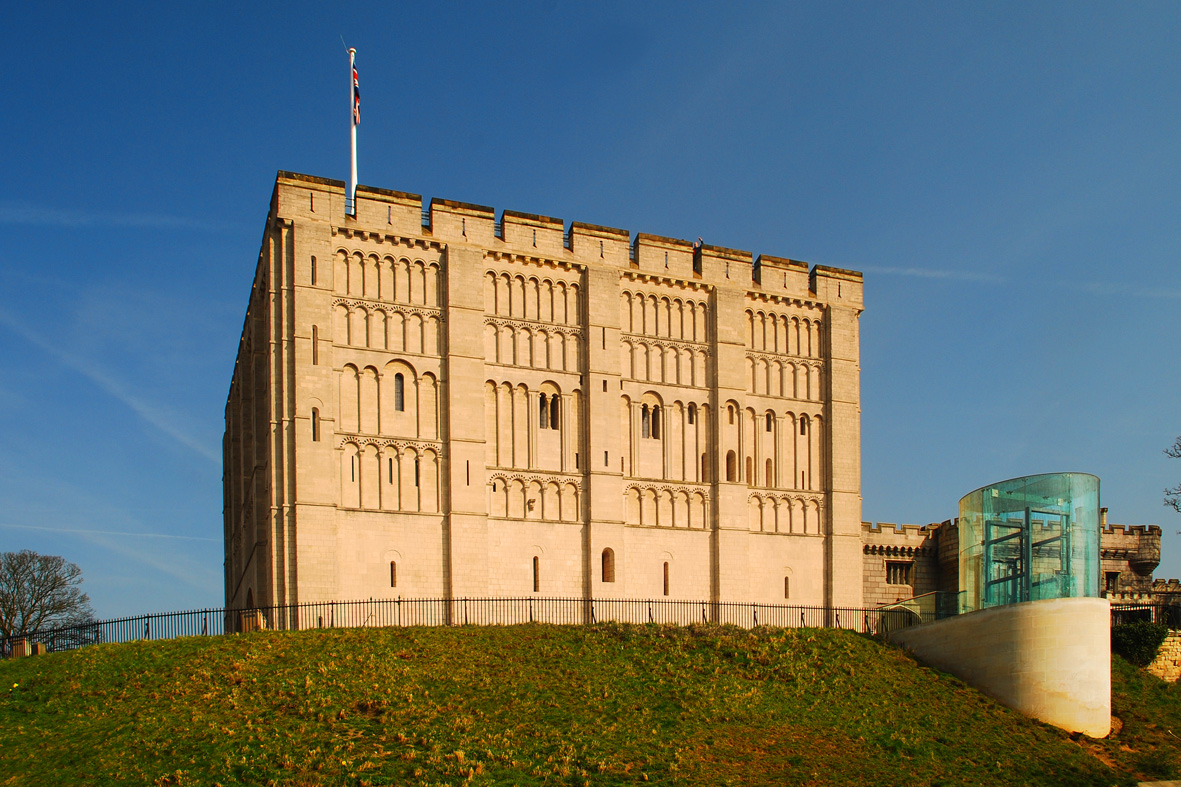
Norwich Castle was captured by Hugh Bigod with a force of over 800 soldiers in July 1174.

In the spring of 1174 the rebellion continued. David, Earl of Huntingdon, brother of William the Lion, moved back south to attempt the conquest of northern England and took up the leadership of the rebel barons. William de Ferrers, Earl of Derby and one of the rebels, burned the royal burgh of Nottingham while Hugh Bigod likewise torched Norwich.

Henry II, who had been in Normandy fighting his enemies, landed in England on 8 July. His first act was to do penance for the death of Thomas Becket, who was murdered by some of Henry's knights three years earlier and had already been canonized as a saint. The day following the ceremony at Canterbury, on 13 July, in a seeming act of divine providence for Henry II, William the Lion and many of his supporters were surprised and captured at the Battle of Alnwick by a small band of loyalists. In the aftermath Henry II was able to sweep up the opposition, marching through each rebel stronghold to receive their surrenders. With England taken care of, Henry returned to Normandy and set about a settlement with his enemies, and on 30 September "King Henry, the king's son, and his brothers, returned to their father and to his service, as their lord". Peace was sealed by the Treaty of Montlouis.

== Aftermath ==
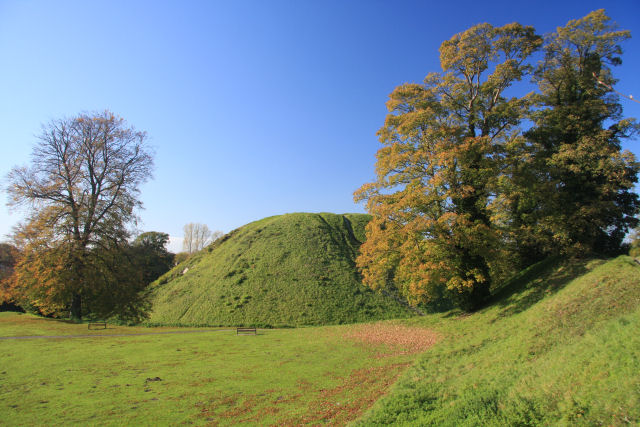
Thetford Castle in Norfolk belonged to Hugh Bigod, Earl of Norfolk, and was demolished on the king's orders after the rebellion ended.

The revolt lasted eighteen months, and played out across a large area from southern Scotland to Brittany. Many towns were destroyed and many people were killed. Blame was placed on young Henry's advisers, the rebel barons, who manipulated the inexperienced and rash princes for their own dreams of gain. William Marshal, who was loyal to young Henry during the revolt, said "cursed be the day when the traitors schemed to embroil the father and the son". Another contemporary source that admonishes Henry the Young's is that of Roger of Howden, in his historical works titled Chronica magistri Rogeri de Houedene. A royal clerk under Henry's administration, Roger spares no words for the betrayal leveled against Henry, writing "Thus did the king’s son lose both his feelings and his senses; he repulsed the innocent, persecuted a father, usurped authority, seized upon a kingdom, he alone was the guilty one, and yet a whole army conspired against his father". Although contemporary sources often paint Henry II as the victim of the rebellion, it is well known that Henry's rule was quite authoritarian and had not much interest in sharing power. Henry the Young's image of a rebellious youth shifted over time to that of a just prince who fought to counter his fathers despotic rule. Historian Martin Aurell writes, "In the songs of the troubadours and in the Italian novellas, he even became the ideal model of the lavish youth, generous to poor knights, as opposed to his father, the old and miserly King Henry II, who deserved the revolt against him". At least twenty castles in England were recorded as having been demolished on the orders of the king. After the war came to an end, Henry II sent two of his sons – Richard and Geoffrey – to ensure that castles built in Poitou and Brittany during the conflict were destroyed.

Although Young Henry's revolt ended in failure, it did show that there were underlying tensions in the Angevin Empire that would eventually lead to its collapse. Less than 50 years later, English holdings in France would crumble under renewed resistance by Phillip II of France. Even though the Revolt of 1173-74 did not directly lead to the fall of the Angevin Empire, even strengthening Henry II's rule in the aftermath, the grievances of the rebels who sided with Young Henry would not go away quietly. According to historian Thomas M. Jones, "the complex events of those two years constituted a watershed for medieval England".

== Sources ==
- Bartlett, Robert (2000). England under the Norman and Angevin Kings, 1075–1225. The New Oxford History of England. Oxford: Oxford University Press. ISBN 978-0199564491.
- Brown, R. Allen (April 1959), "A List of Castles, 1154–1216", The English Historical Review, 74 (291), Oxford University Press: 249–280, doi:10.1093/ehr/lxxiv.291.249, JSTOR 558442
- Fryde, E. B.; Greenway, D. E.; Porter, S.; Roy, I. (1996), Handbook of British Chronology (3rd revised ed.), Cambridge, UK: Cambridge University Press, ISBN 0-521-56350-X
- Grant, Lindy (2025). Eleanor of Aquitaine: Woman, Queen and Legend. Reaktion Books. ISBN 9781836390862.
- Hosler, John (2007). Henry II: A Medieval Soldier at War, 1147–1189. Brill. doi:10.1163/ej.9789004157248.i-275. ISBN 978-90-474-1934-1.
- Staunton, Michael (2017). The Historians of Angevin England. Oxford University Press. doi:10.1093/oso/9780198769965.001.0001., especially chapter 11
- Strickland, Matthew (2016). Henry the Young King, 1155-1183. Yale University Press. ISBN 9780300215519.
- Wareham, Andrew (1994), "The Motives and Politics of the Bigod Family, c. 1066–1177", Anglo-Norman Studies, XVII, The Boydell Press, ISSN 0954-9927
- Warren, W. L. (1973), Henry II, Eyre Methuen, ISBN 978-0-520-02282-9
