= William Peverel the Younger =

Norman knight

William "the Younger" Peverel (c. 1080 or c. 1090 – after 1155) was the son of William Peverel. He married Avicia de Lancaster (1088 – c. 1150) in La Marche, Normandy, France. She was possibly the daughter of William de Lancaster I and Countess Gundred de Warenne, daughter of William de Warenne, 2nd Earl of Surrey. In 1114, she bore a daughter, Margaret Peverel. Another member of his family, Maude Peverel (a sister or daughter) was, by 1120, the first wife of Robert fitz Martin.

William inherited the Honour of Peverel.

William was a principal supporter of King Stephen, and a commander in the Battle of the Standard against invading Scots in 1138. He was captured at the Battle of Lincoln in 1141, and was stripped of his estates.

King Henry II dispossessed William of the Honour in 1153, for conspiring to poison Ranulf de Gernon, although historians speculate that the King wished to punish him for his "wickedness and treason" in supporting King Stephen. The Earl died before he took possession of the Honour, and it stayed in the Crown for about a half century.

== Sources ==
- Jones, Michael (1980). "The Charters Of Robert II De Ferrers, Earl Of Nottingham, Derby And Ferrers". Nottingham Medieval Studies. 24(Jan). Brepols: 7–26.9
