= Ferrers family =

Noble Anglo-Norman family

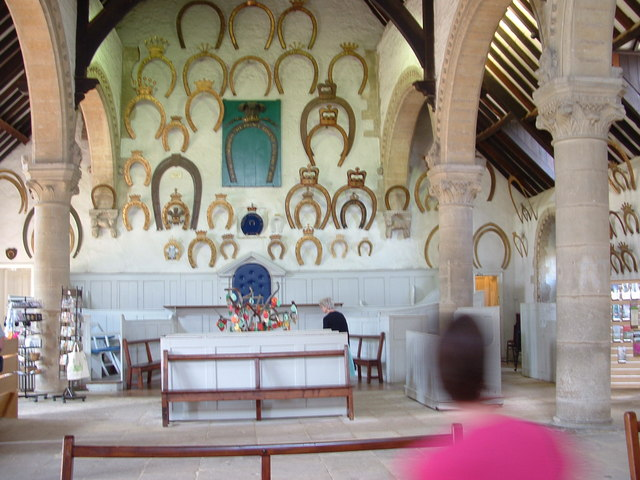
Great hall of Oakham Castle in Rutland (built 1180/90 by Walkelin de Ferrers) where ceremonial horseshoes are still presented today by prominent visitors in honour of the de Ferrers family

The Ferrers family were a noble Anglo-Norman family that crossed to England with the Norman Conquest and gave rise to a line that would hold the Earldom of Derby for six generations before losing it in rebellion. They also gave rise to several lines that held English peerages, the longest-living going extinct in the male line in the 15th century, as well as a Norman branch of the family that persisted into the 13th century. A French line persisted into the 16th century.

== Origin ==
Left: Supposed early proto-heraldic arms of the de Ferrers family: Argent, six horseshoes sable. Right: Actual arms adopted by William de Ferrers, 4th Earl of Derby (1168–1247) at the start of the age of heraldry (c.1200-1215): Vairy, or and gules

The family is first documented holding Ferrières-Saint-Hilaire in Normandy, an important centre for ironworking, perhaps the reason the manor took its name. (Note: The French verb ferrer (from fer - iron, from Latin ferrum) signifies "to garnish with iron" thus "to shoe a horse", hence the English word "farrier".) Their Norman toponymic surname, de Ferrières, evolved into simply de Ferrers, sometimes Latinized as de Ferrariis.

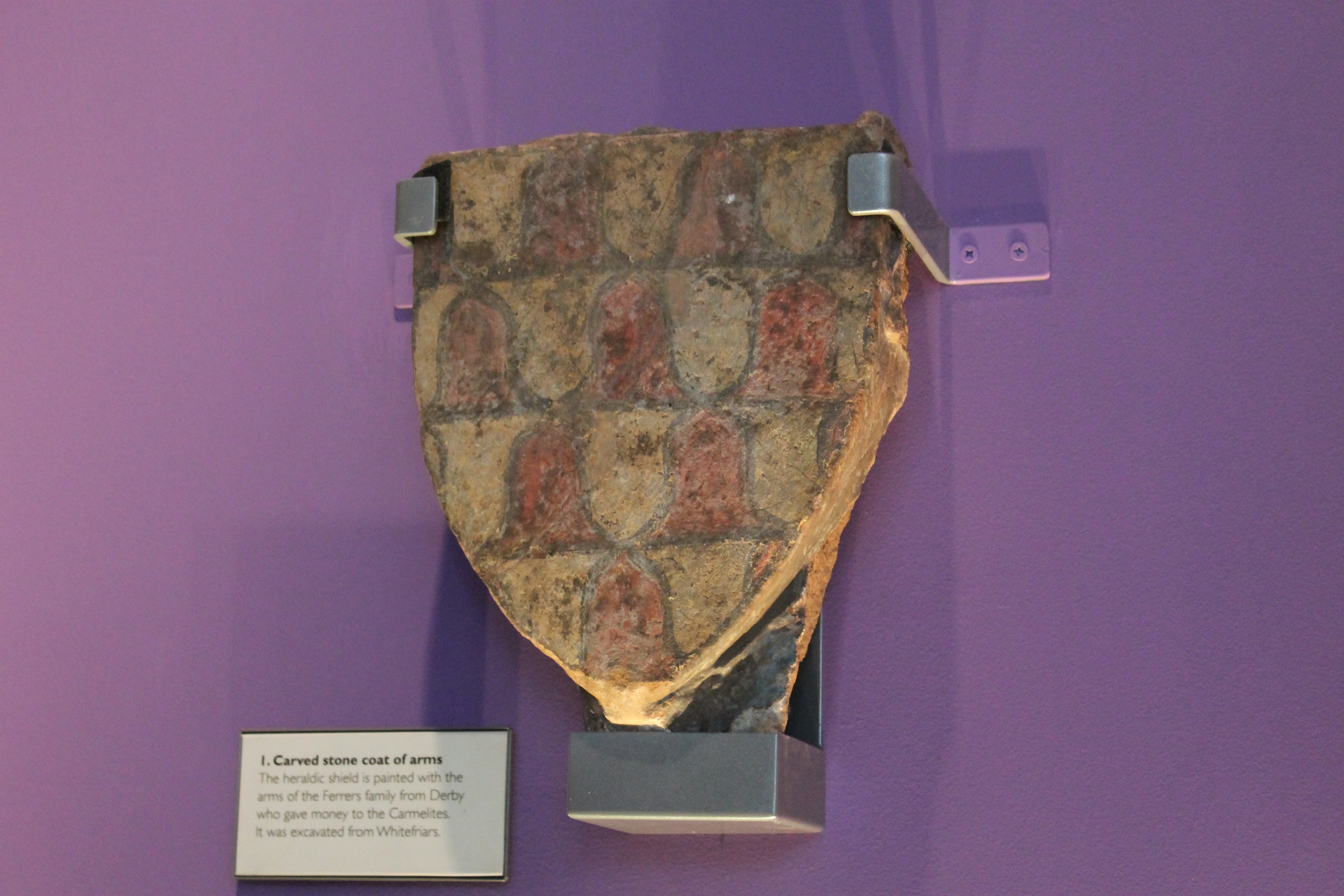
A carved stone heraldic shield painted with the coat of arms of the Ferrers family, excavated from Whitefriars in Coventry: Vairy, or and gules

Walkelin de Ferrières, the first documented family member, was killed in the civil wars of William II, Duke of Normandy. His son, Henry de Ferrers, was Lord of Longueville in Normandy when he participated in the Norman Conquest of England in 1066. Henry brought three of his feudal followers and tenants to England in his retinue, namely the knights de Curzon (from Notre Dame-de-Courson), the de Baskerville (from Boscherville) and the de Levett (from Livet-en-Ouche), who all subsequently founded prominent English families. Henry was richly rewarded by King William the Conqueror by the grant of 210 manors throughout England and Wales, situated mainly in Derbyshire and Leicestershire. He first served William I in England as the Governor of Stafford Castle and in about 1066 or 1067 he was granted the lands in Berkshire and Wiltshire of the defeated Anglo-Saxon Goderic, the former Sheriff of Berkshire.

Henry acted as a Commissioner for the compilation of the Domesday Book of 1086 and was soon appointed the first Anglo-Norman Sheriff of Berkshire. He built Tutbury Castle in Staffordshire, which he adopted as his caput. He also built castles at Duffield and Pilsbury. Henry died 1100 at Tutbury Priory in Staffordshire, where he and his wife Bertha, perhaps a member of the L'Aigle family, had founded Tutbury Priory in 1080. They had at least four children, a daughter Amicia, wife of Nigel d'Aubigny of Cainhoe, and sons William, Engenulph and Robert, who became the first Earl of Derby.

=== Earls of Derby ===
Arms of William de Ferrers, 5th Earl of Derby (c.1193-1254) who added to his paternal arms a bordure azure (or sable) charged with eight horseshoes argent,

Robert de Ferrers, youngest son of Henry, rose in the service of king Stephen of England, and was awarded the Earldom of Derby after serving as one of Stephen's commanders at the Battle of the Standard in 1138. The earldom would descend in his family until Robert de Ferrers, 6th Earl of Derby was attainted in 1267 for his participation in the Second Barons' War against king Henry III. Draconian terms were set for the reacquisition of his lands, and he was only able to have the manor of Chartley, Staffordshire, restored to him in 1275. Though the family ceased to hold the earldom, two new peerages were created in his immediate family, his son being later created Baron Ferrers of Chartley, while a nephew became the 1st Baron Ferrers of Groby.

=== Barons Ferrers of Chartley ===
John Ferrers, son of the 6th Earl, carried on an unsuccessful life-long struggle to have his father's properties restored, but was himself summoned to Parliament in 1299 as Baron Ferrers of Chartley. This peerage continued in his line until William de Ferrers, 7th Baron Ferrers of Chartley died in 1450 without male issue, after which it passed into several successive families descending from them in the female line before going into abeyance in 1855.

==== Baron of Wem ====
In 1375, Robert de Ferrers, a younger son of the 3rd Baron Ferrers of Chartley and grandson of the 1st Baron, was summoned to parliament as Robert Ferrers of Wem. By modern usage, this would be seen to have created a novel peerage, the Barons Ferrers of Wem. However, Vicary Gibbs has argued that such a formulation would be anachronistic, and that he should be viewed as simply a recognition of his claim, jure uxoris to the title inherited by his wife, heiress of the Barons Boteler of Wem. Were it a new creation then his son Robert Ferrers of Wem would be considered the 2nd Baron, but following Gibbs, he held no title as he predeceased his mother. Any claim to the title would have gone into abeyance via the son's two daughters.

=== Barons Ferrers of Groby ===
Arms of Ferrers, Baron Ferrers of Groby: Gules, seven mascles or conjoined 3:3:1.

Months after John de Ferrers became the 1st baron Ferrers of Chartley, his first cousin William de Ferrers, son of Sir William de Ferrers of Groby Castle in Leicestershire and himself a younger son of William de Ferrers, 5th Earl of Derby was summoned to Parliament in December 1299 as Baron Ferrers of Groby. The title continued in the male line until the death of William Ferrers, 5th Baron Ferrers of Groby in 1445 without male issue, when it continued via a female line, becoming forfeit in 1554.

=== Ferrers of Oakham, Rutland ===
The Norman lands of English founder Henry de Ferrers passed to one of his two elder sons, William or Engenulf, and thence to a younger Henry de Ferrers, a son of one of these two. He also held lands in England, at Lechlade, Gloucestershire, and Oakham, Rutland. His son, Walchelin de Ferriers, inherited both Henry's English and Norman lands, but the loss of Normandy to the King of France led to a division of the estate, with the Norman properties continuing through his son Henry to a line of lords of Ferriers and Chambrais that only went extinct in 1504, while Lechlade and Oakham passed via his daughter Isabel to the Mortimers of Wigmore.

== Heraldry ==
Due to the etymology of their surname, sources say that the early heraldic device of the de Ferrers family was a horse-shoe, or six black ones on a white background, blazoned: Argent, six horseshoes sable. However Fox-Davies in his Complete Guide to Heraldry (1909) suggests that these were in fact the arms of the Marshal family, the ancient military office of marshal being responsible for the care (and thus shoeing) of war-horses - the first wife of William de Ferrers, 5th Earl of Derby, by whom he had only daughters, was Sibyl Marshal, a daughter of William Marshal, 1st Earl of Pembroke. In reality the arms adopted by the de Ferrers family at the start of the age of heraldry (c.1200-1215) were: Vairy, or and gules. However William de Ferrers, 5th Earl of Derby (c.1193-1254) added to his paternal arms A bordure azure (or sable) charged with eight horseshoes argent, perhaps as a mark of difference.

At Oakham Castle in Rutland, built in 1180/90, ceremonial horseshoes are still presented today by prominent visitors in honour of the de Ferrers family, described in James Wright's 1684 History and Antiquities of the County of Rutland:

The Lord of the castle and manor of Okeham for the time being claims by prescription a Franchise or Royalty very rare and of singular note, viz. : That the first time any Peer of this Kingdom shall happen to pass through the precincts of this Lordship, he shall forfeit as a Homage a Shoe from the Horse on which he rideth unless he redeem it with money. The true Original of which custome I have not been able on my utmost endeavour to discover. But that such is, and time out of mind hath been, the Usage, appears by several Monumental Horseshoes (some gilded and of curious Workmanship) nail'd upon the Castle Hall Door.

Many survive, each inscribed with the name and title of the peer who presented it. Many bear crests and coronets, the so-called "Golden Shoe" (taken off Lord Willoughby de Eresby's favourite horse "Clinker") was "once abstracted by some ingenious thief who mistook the gilding for gold; but returned it in a railway parcel on discovering his error".

In lieu of his paternal arms, the first Baron Ferrers of Groby adopted his maternal arms Gules, seven mascles or conjoined 3:3:1, the arms of de Quincy.
