= Ferrers =

Ferrers may refer to:

== People ==
- The Ferrers family

Notable people

- Charles Vere Ferrers Townshend, (1861–1924), British army general
- Elizabeth Ferrers, (c. 1250 – c. 1300), daughter of William de Ferrers, 5th Earl of Derby
- George Ferrers, (1500? – 1579), Member of Parliament for Plymouth in the Parliament of 1542
- Henry de Ferrers, Norman soldier may have taken part in the conquest of England
- Norman Macleod Ferrers, (1829–1903), British mathematician
- Robert Ferrers (1373–1396), (c. 1373 – bef. 1396),
- Lady Katherine Ferrers, (1634–1660), highwaywoman
- several people named Walkelin de Ferrers,
  - Walchelin de Ferriers, (died 1201), Norman baron and principal captain of Richard I of England
  - Walkelin de Derby, (c. 1135–1190), Norman lord of Eggington

Noble title

- Baron Ferrers of Chartley, English title created on 1299, fell into abeyance in 1855
- Baron Ferrers of Groby, title in the Peerage of England created in 1300, forfeit in 1554
- see Earl of Derby, title in the Peerage of England, created in 1139
  - Robert de Ferrers, 1st Earl of Derby,
  - Robert de Ferrers, 2nd Earl of Derby,
  - William de Ferrers, 3rd Earl of Derby,
  - William de Ferrers, 4th Earl of Derby,
  - William de Ferrers, 5th Earl of Derby,
  - Robert de Ferrers, 6th Earl of Derby,
- Earl Ferrers, title in the Peerage of Great Britain, 1711.

== Places etc. in England ==
- Bere Ferrers, Devon, a village
  - Bere Ferrers railway station
- Churston Ferrers, Devon, an historic parish
  - Churston Ferrers Grammar School
- Higham Ferrers, Northamptonshire, a town
  - Higham Ferrers (UK Parliament constituency)
  - Higham Ferrers railway station
- Newton Ferrers, Devon, a village
- Newton Ferrers, Cornwall, a former manor
- South Woodham Ferrers, Essex, a town
  - South Woodham Ferrers railway station
- Woodham Ferrers, Essex, a village

== See also ==
- Ferrer (disambiguation)
