= Walkelin (given name) =

Walkelin is a Norman masculine given name which may refer to:

- Walkelin (died 1098), the first Norman bishop of Winchester
- Walkelin or Vauquelin de Ferrers (died c. 1045), Seigneur of Ferrières-Saint-Hilaire and father of Henry de Ferrers
- Walkelin de Derby (c. 1135–1190), Norman lord of Egginton
- Walkelin (Archdeacon of Suffolk) (fl. before 1143–after 1186), Archdeacon of Suffolk
- Walkelin or Walchelin de Ferriers (died 1201), Anglo-Norman baron and principal captain of King Richard I of England

== See also ==
- Vauquelin (disambiguation)
