= Vauquelin =

Vauquelin may refer to:

== People ==
- Vauquelin de Ferrers (died ca. 1045), Norman baron of Ferrières-Saint-Hilaire
- Vauquelin de Winchester, French name of Walkelin (died 1098), the first Norman bishop of Winchester
- Jean Vauquelin (1728–1772), French naval officer
- Jean Vauquelin de la Fresnaye (1536–1608), French poet
- Kévin Vauquelin (born 2001), French cyclist
- Nicolas Vauquelin des Yveteaux (1567–1649), French poet, the son of Jean Vauquelin de la Fresnaye
- Louis Nicolas Vauquelin (1763–1829), French pharmacist and chemist
- Moïse Vauquelin (fl. 1650–1670), French buccaneer
- Roger Vauquelin des Yveteaux, president of the 1940s French fascist youth organization Jeunesse Populaire Française

== French Navy ships ==
- Vauquelin-class destroyer
  - French destroyer Vauquelin (1932), lead ship of the class, launched in 1932 and scuttled in 1942
- French destroyer Vauquelin (D628), a destroyer launched in 1955 and expended as a target in 2004

== Other uses ==
- Vauquelin Square, in Montreal, Canada

== See also ==
- Walchelin de Ferriers (died 1201), Anglo-Norman baron and principal captain of King Richard I of England
- Walkelin (given name)
- Jean Wauquelin (died 1452), French writer and translator
- Michel Gauquelin (1928–1991), French psychologist and statistician
