= Walkelin de Ferrers =

Walkelin de Ferrers may refer to:

- Walkelin or Vauquelin de Ferrers (died c. 1045), Seigneur of Ferrières-Saint-Hilaire and father of magnate Henry de Ferrers
- Walkelin de Derby (c. 1135–1190), Norman lord of Egginton
- Walkelin or Walchelin de Ferriers (died 1201), Anglo-Norman baron and principal captain of King Richard I of England
