= Jonquerets-de-Livet =

- Part of Mesnil-en-Ouche
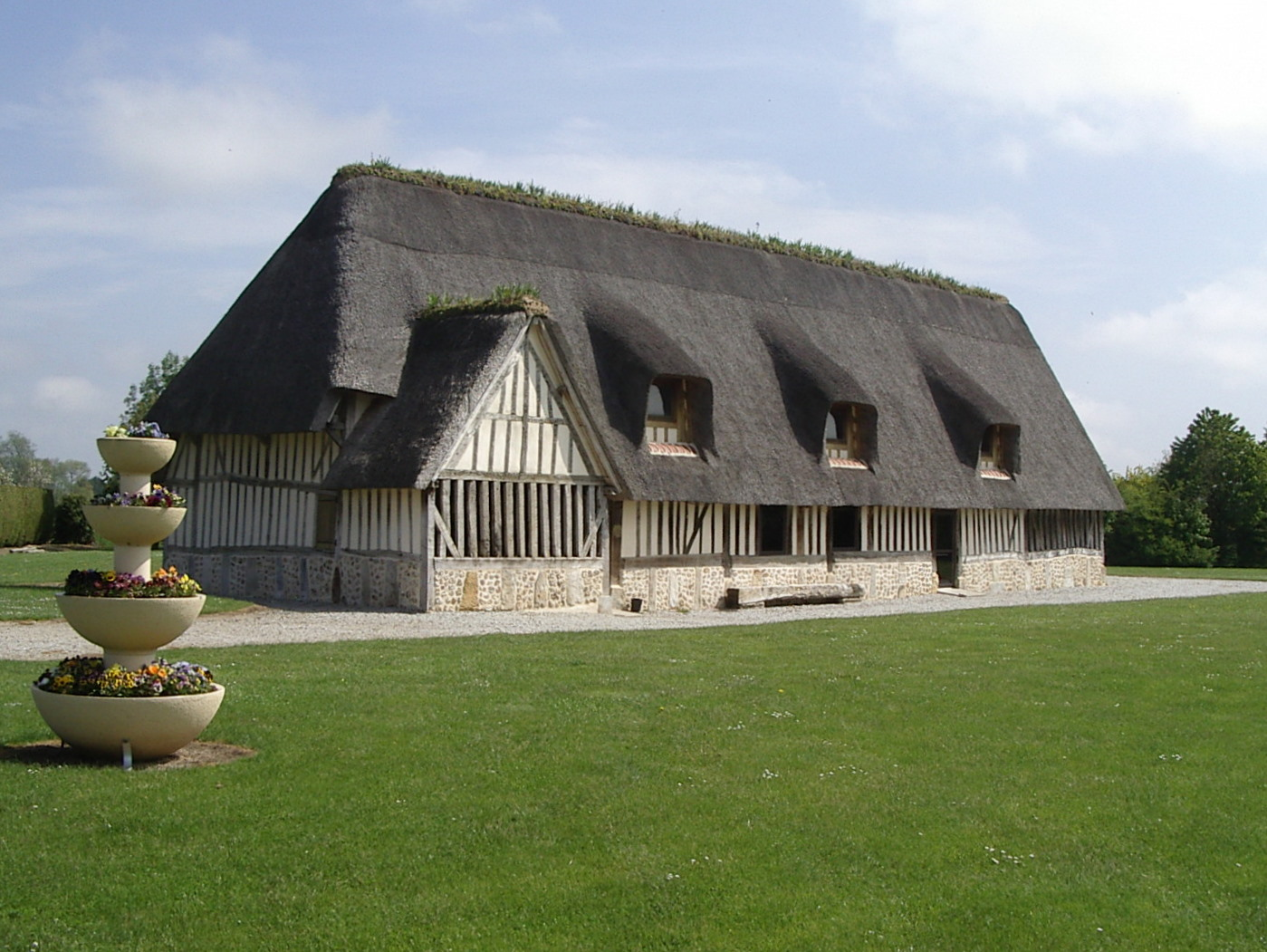
- Former presshouse

- Coat of arms
- Location of Jonquerets-de-Livet
- Location within France Location within Normandy
- Coordinates: 49°01′20″N 0°36′33″E
- Country: France
- Region: Normandy
- Department: Eure
- Arrondissement: Bernay
- Canton: Bernay
- Commune: Mesnil-en-Ouche
- Area^{1}: 10.28 km^{2} (3.97 sq mi)
- Elevation: 134 m (440 ft)
- Highest elevation: 181 m (594 ft)
- Lowest elevation: 163 m (535 ft)
- Population (2023): 324
  - Density: 31.5/km^{2} (81.6/sq mi)
- Time zone: UTC+01:00 (CET)
  - Summer (DST): UTC+02:00 (CEST)
- Postal code: 27410
- ^{1} French Land Register data, which excludes lakes, ponds, glaciers > 1 km^{2} (0.386 sq mi or 247 acres) and river estuaries.

Jonquerets-de-Livet (French pronunciation: [ʒɔ̃kʁɛ də livɛ]), also Les Jonquerets-de-Livet ([le ʒɔ̃kʁɛ də livɛ]), is a former commune in the Eure department in Normandy, France. On 1 January 2016, it was merged into the new commune of Mesnil-en-Ouche. It incorporates the village of Livet-en-Ouche, once known simply as Livet.

== Etymology ==
Mentioned as Lived in the 11th century.

For "L'ivet" with article agglutination. (Northern) French if (Yew-tree) and suffixe -etu(m) > -ey / -oy /-ay > -aie, used to mean "collection of trees", so that Livet means "yew grove" (l'ivaie in modern French).

The qualificative of the former name -en-Ouche, means "in the Pays d'Ouche", a traditional region of Normandy, to make the difference with other Livets, like Livet-sur-Authou.

In 1845, the commune was incorporated in a new one, together with Les Jonquerets (Les Junchereiz 1209 "The brooms place"), called Les Jonquerets de Livet.

== History ==
The de Livet family, feudal under-tenants of the barony of the de Ferrières family (centered on that family's seat at Ferrières-Saint-Hilaire, located a scant four miles from Jonquerets-de-Livet), originated in Livet-en-Ouche. Descendants of one branch of this family became the Marquises of Barville in France (de Livet de Barville).

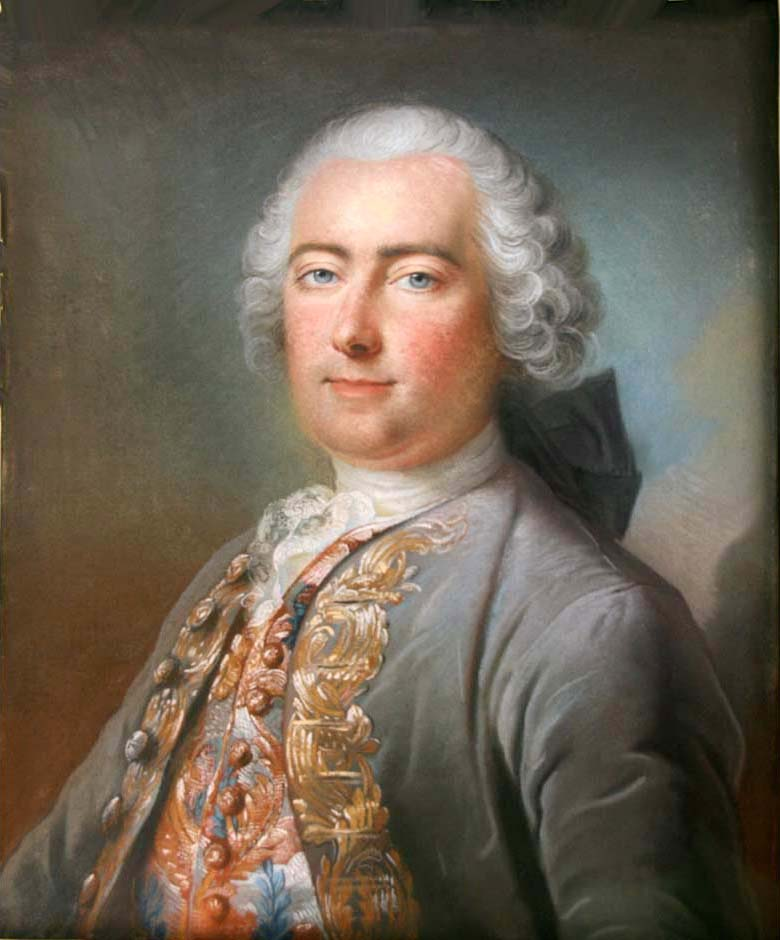
Louis-François de Livet, Chevalier, Marquis de Barville, 1766. Buried at Bazoques in 1789.

The Norman French branch of the de Livet family counts among its members early knights (chevaliers), church officials (including Guillaume de Livet, a judge at the trial of Joan of Arc), Canon of Rouen Robert de Livet (who excommunicated King Henry V of England during his siege of Rouen, after which de Livet was imprisoned for five years in England) chevalier banneret Jean de Livet (standard bearer to King Philip II of France in 1215) and early Crusaders. Many de Livet family members were associated with the Knights Hospitallers, a medieval chivalric order founded to protect pilgrims to the Holy Land.

The de Livets were among the ancient noble families (noblesse ancienne, or Noblesse d'épée) of France. The family's name appears in the earliest records of Normandy. One branch of the family later became the Marquis de Livet de Barville. Another branch was named the hereditary controllers of the rivers and waterways of Normandy in the 13th century, reflected in the use of an anchor on that branch of the family's French coat of arms. The family traditionally bore as their coat of arms three molettes d'or (gold) on a blue (azure) background.

Another branch of the family settled at Arentot in Ourville (now Arantot, hamlet at Ourville-en-Caux). Georges de Livet, a member of this branch of the de Livet family, was killed at the battle of Agincourt in 1415. The last member of this branch of the family, who died without descendants, was comte Constantin Augustin Robert de Lyvet, mayor of Ourville, who died in 1924.

During the Norman Conquest of England, a branch of the de Livet family followed the de Ferrers (later the Earls of Derby) to England, along with the Curzons (Notre-Dame-de-Courson) and the Baskervilles (Basqueville, now Bacqueville-en-Caux), who were also under-tenants of the old Ferrieres fiefdom in Normandy. The name of this branch of the de Livet family was anglicized into the name Levett, Levet, Lyvet, Livett, Leavett and its variants.

== Sights ==
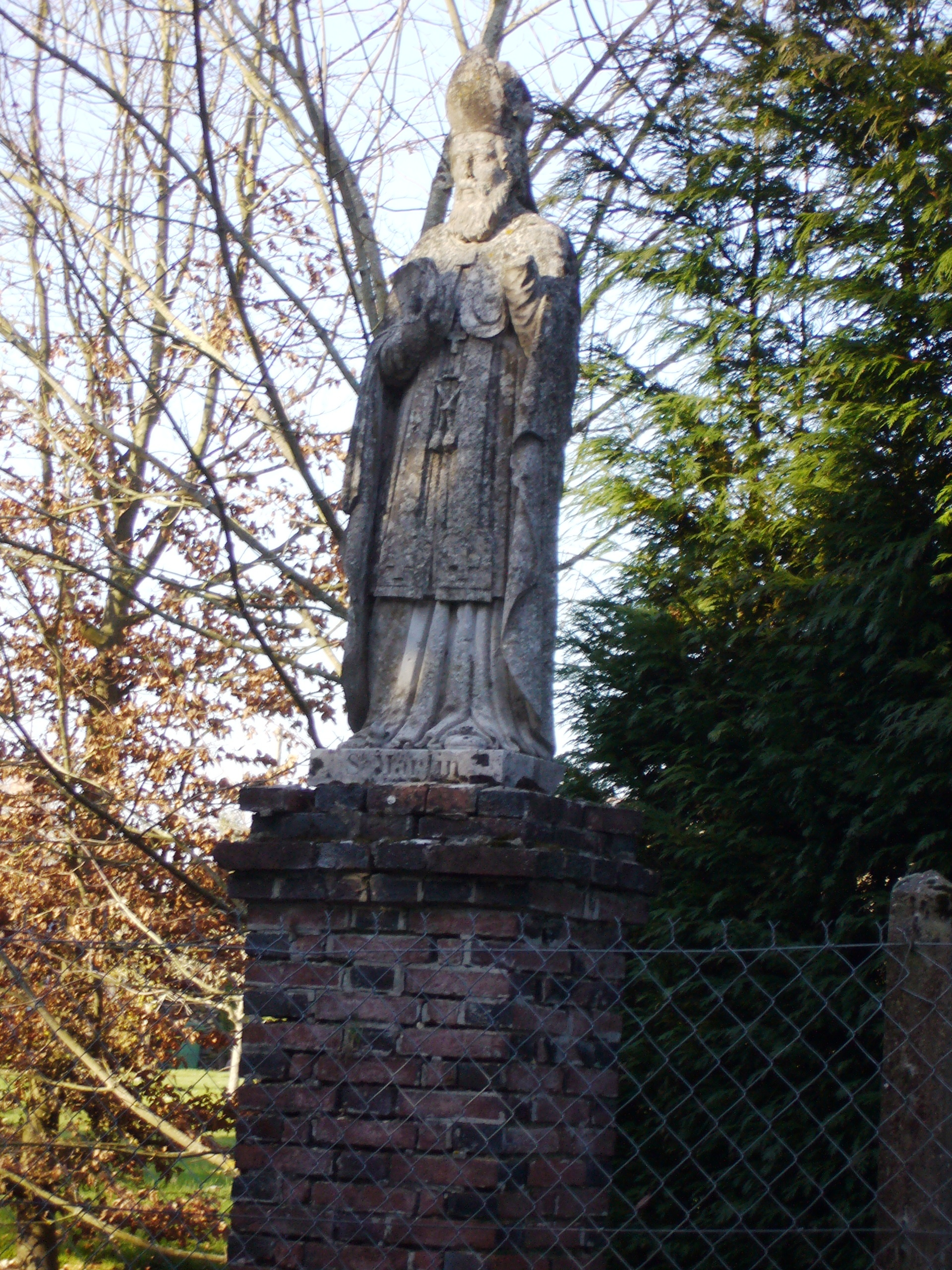
Statue of Saint-Martin on the former emplacement of the Livet-en-Ouche church

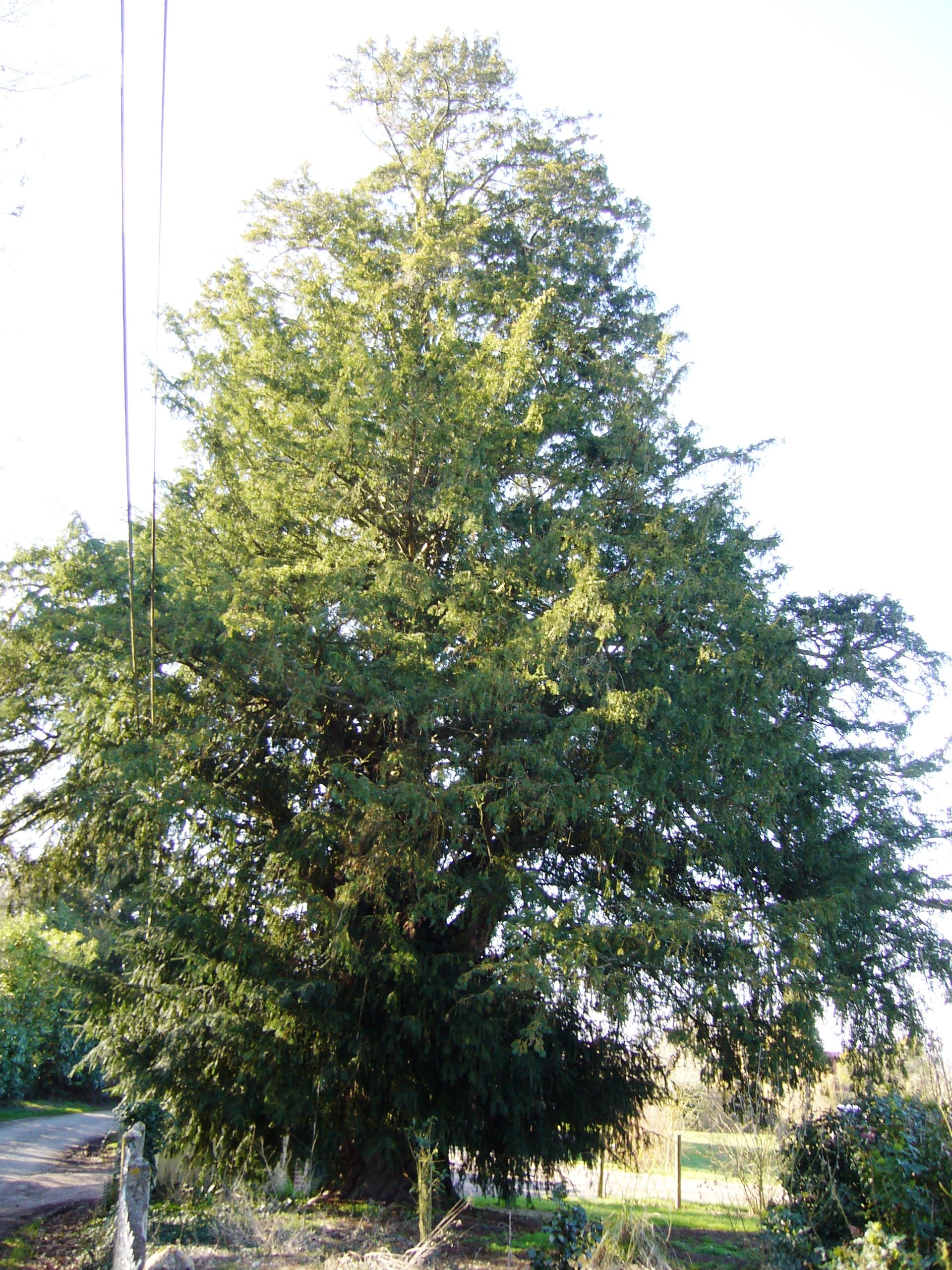
Old Yew in the former Churchyard of Saint-Martin

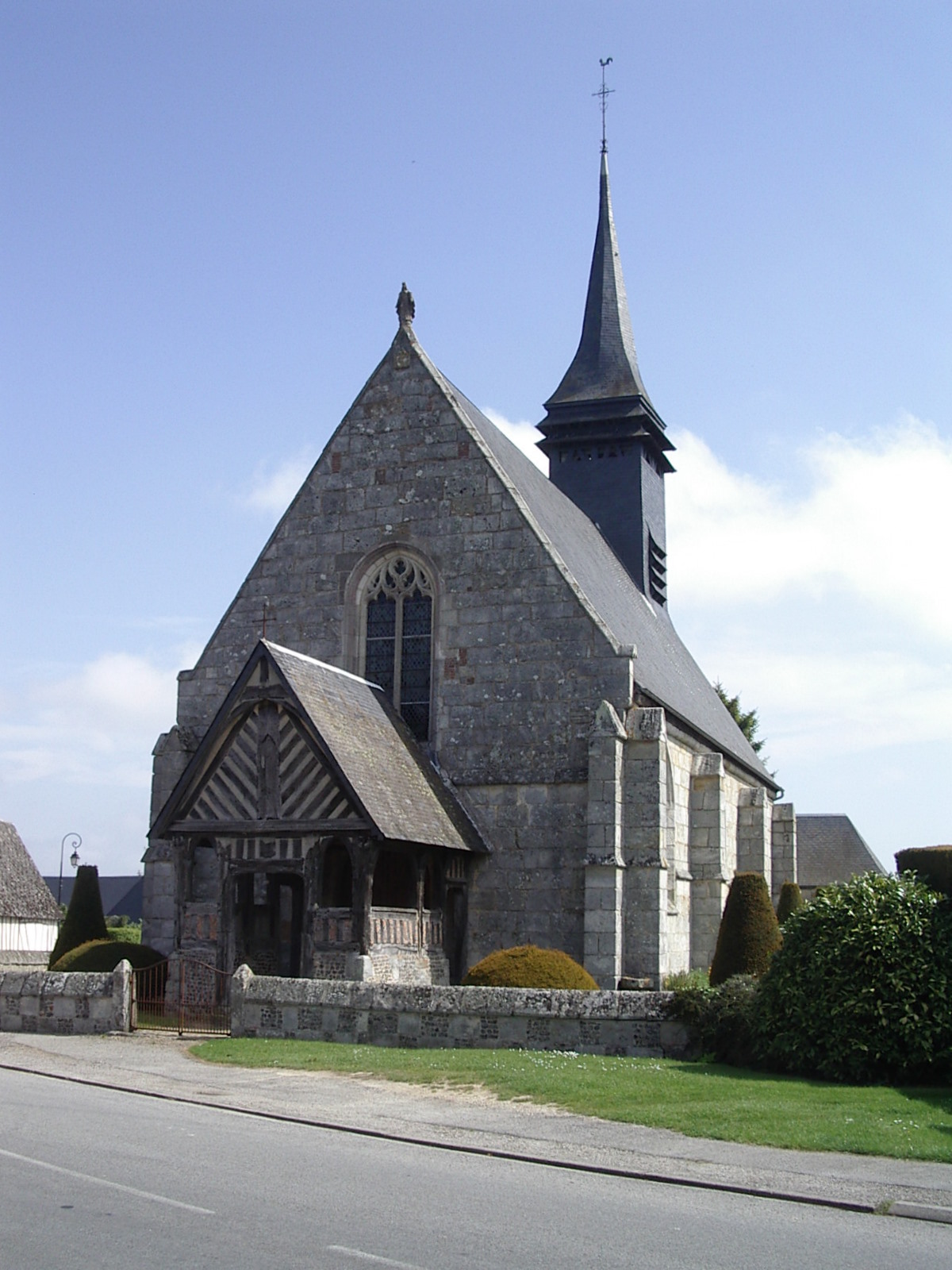
Notre Dame Church of Les Jonquerets
- Thousand year old yew-tree in the former Churchyard, near the destroyed Saint-Martin church in the hamlet Livet. Statue of Saint Martin near the old yew. The church was demolished around 1835.
- 16th-century Gothic Notre-Dame church in Les Jonquerets. Chancel rebuilt in the 19th century
- Half-timbered manor, 16th and 18th centuries.
- Presshouse 17th century (see above).

== See also ==
- Communes of the Eure department
- de Livet de Barville, en français
