= Gouttières =

Gouttières is the name of two communes in France:

- Gouttières, Eure
- Gouttières, Puy-de-Dôme
