= Ajou =

Ajou could refer to:

- Ajou Ajou (born 2002), Canadian football wide receiver
- Ajou Deng (born 1978), South Sudanese-British basketball coach
- Ajou, Eure, a former commune in Eure département, France
- Ajou University, a private research university in Suwon, South Korea
