= Saint-Aubin-le-Guichard =

- Part of Mesnil-en-Ouche
- Location of Saint-Aubin-le-Guichard
- Location within France Location within Normandy
- Coordinates: 49°02′24″N 0°42′04″E
- Country: France
- Region: Normandy
- Department: Eure
- Arrondissement: Bernay
- Canton: Bernay
- Commune: Mesnil-en-Ouche
- Area^{1}: 11.13 km^{2} (4.30 sq mi)
- Elevation: 145 m (476 ft)
- Highest elevation: 164 m (538 ft)
- Lowest elevation: 115 m (377 ft)
- Population (2023): 284
  - Density: 25.5/km^{2} (66.1/sq mi)
- Time zone: UTC+01:00 (CET)
  - Summer (DST): UTC+02:00 (CEST)
- Postal code: 27410
- ^{1} French Land Register data, which excludes lakes, ponds, glaciers > 1 km^{2} (0.386 sq mi or 247 acres) and river estuaries.

Saint-Aubin-le-Guichard (French pronunciation: [sɛ̃.t‿obɛ̃ lə ɡiʃaʁ]) is a former commune in the Eure department in Normandy in northern France. On 1 January 2016, it was merged into the new commune of Mesnil-en-Ouche.

== See also ==
- Communes of the Eure department
