= Gisay-la-Coudre =

- Part of Mesnil-en-Ouche
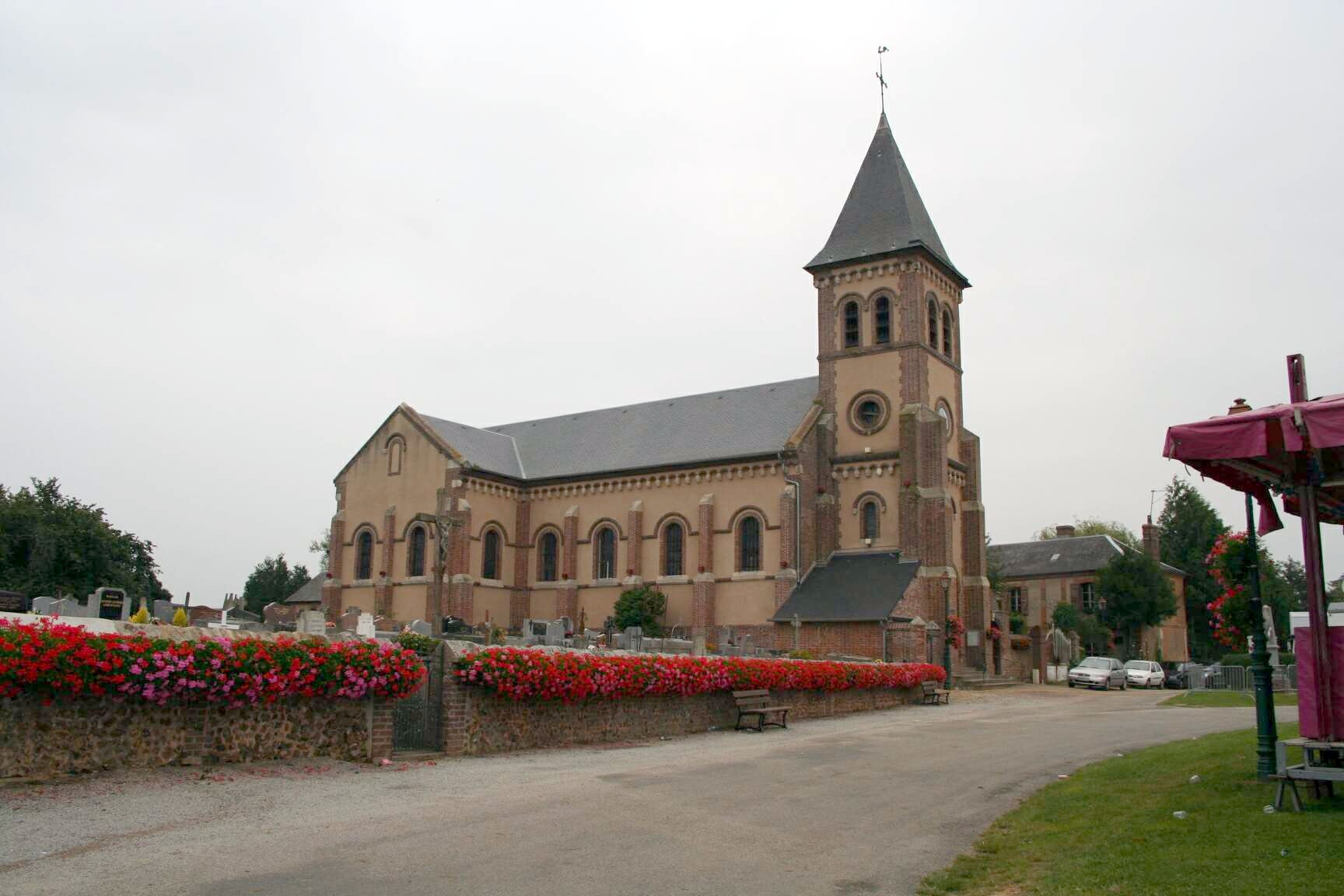
- Location of Gisay-la-Coudre
- Location within France Location within Normandy
- Coordinates: 48°57′04″N 0°37′37″E
- Country: France
- Region: Normandy
- Department: Eure
- Arrondissement: Bernay
- Canton: Bernay
- Commune: Mesnil-en-Ouche
- Area^{1}: 16.27 km^{2} (6.28 sq mi)
- Elevation: 192 m (630 ft)
- Highest elevation: 208 m (682 ft)
- Lowest elevation: 162 m (531 ft)
- Population (2023): 233
  - Density: 14.3/km^{2} (37.1/sq mi)
- Time zone: UTC+01:00 (CET)
  - Summer (DST): UTC+02:00 (CEST)
- Postal code: 27330
- ^{1} French Land Register data, which excludes lakes, ponds, glaciers > 1 km^{2} (0.386 sq mi or 247 acres) and river estuaries.

Gisay-la-Coudre (French pronunciation: [ʒizɛ la kudʁ]) is a former commune in the Eure department in northern France. On 1 January 2016, it was merged into the new commune of Mesnil-en-Ouche.

== See also ==
- Communes of the Eure department
