= Thevray =

- Part of Mesnil-en-Ouche
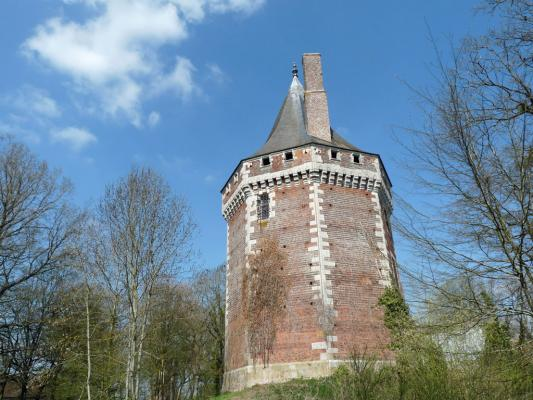
- Chateau

- Coat of arms
- Location of Thevray
- Location within France Location within Normandy
- Coordinates: 48°58′42″N 0°43′54″E
- Country: France
- Region: Normandy
- Department: Eure
- Arrondissement: Bernay
- Canton: Bernay
- Commune: Mesnil-en-Ouche
- Area^{1}: 14.9 km^{2} (5.8 sq mi)
- Elevation: 171 m (561 ft)
- Highest elevation: 188 m (617 ft)
- Lowest elevation: 133 m (436 ft)
- Population (2023): 290
  - Density: 19/km^{2} (50/sq mi)
- Time zone: UTC+01:00 (CET)
  - Summer (DST): UTC+02:00 (CEST)
- Postal code: 27410
- ^{1} French Land Register data, which excludes lakes, ponds, glaciers > 1 km^{2} (0.386 sq mi or 247 acres) and river estuaries.

Thevray (French pronunciation: [təvʁɛ]) is a former commune in the Eure department in Normandy in northern France. On 1 January 2016, it was merged into the new commune of Mesnil-en-Ouche.

== See also ==
- Communes of the Eure department
