= Saint-Pierre-du-Mesnil =

- Part of Mesnil-en-Ouche
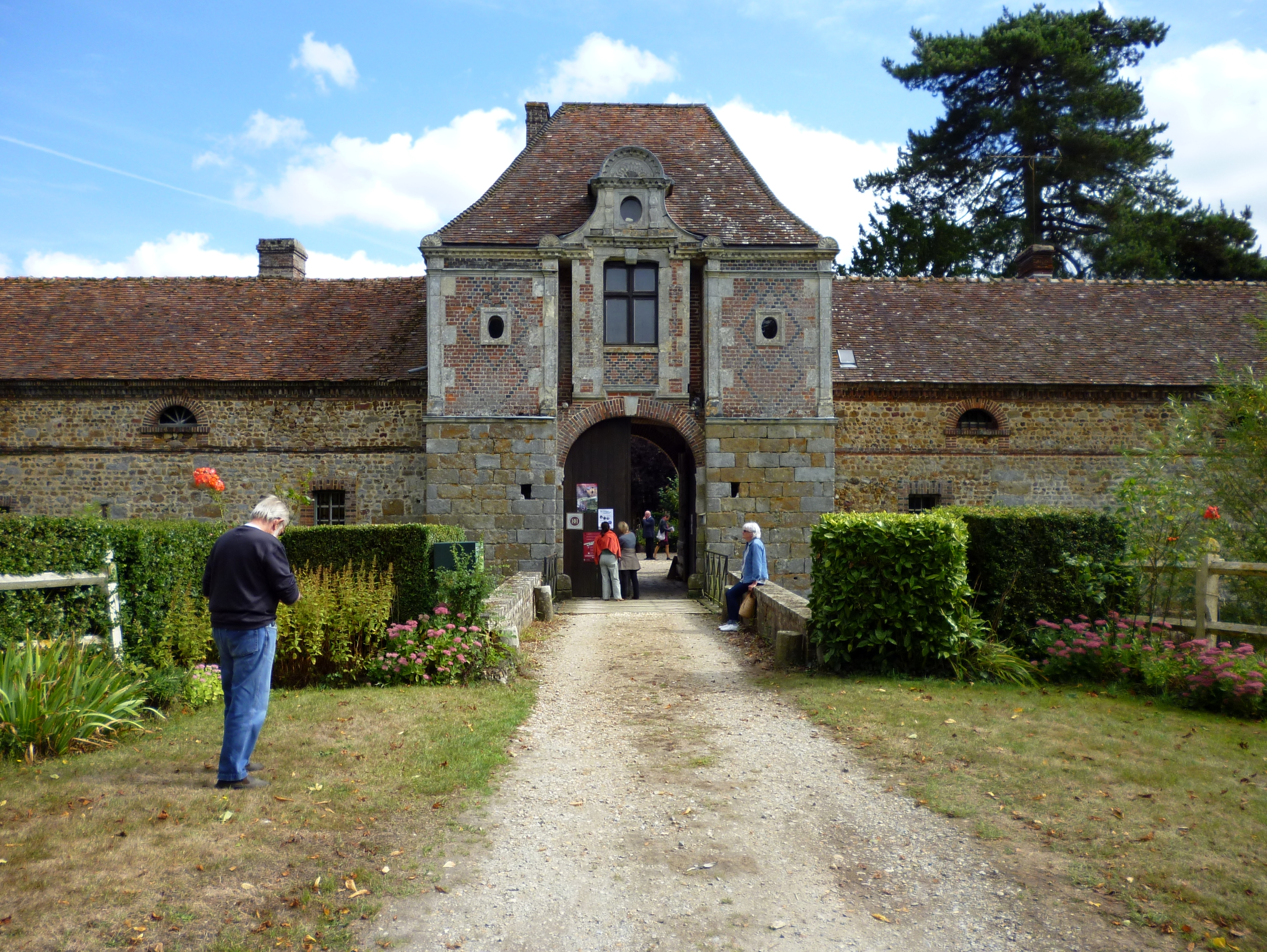
- Blanc-Buisson Castle
- Location of Saint-Pierre-du-Mesnil
- Location within France Location within Normandy
- Coordinates: 48°56′08″N 0°34′41″E
- Country: France
- Region: Normandy
- Department: Eure
- Arrondissement: Bernay
- Canton: Bernay
- Commune: Mesnil-en-Ouche
- Area^{1}: 7.92 km^{2} (3.06 sq mi)
- Elevation: 208 m (682 ft)
- Highest elevation: 212 m (696 ft)
- Lowest elevation: 195 m (640 ft)
- Population (2023): 89
  - Density: 11/km^{2} (29/sq mi)
- Time zone: UTC+01:00 (CET)
  - Summer (DST): UTC+02:00 (CEST)
- Postal code: 27330
- ^{1} French Land Register data, which excludes lakes, ponds, glaciers > 1 km^{2} (0.386 sq mi or 247 acres) and river estuaries.

Saint-Pierre-du-Mesnil (French pronunciation: [sɛ̃ pjɛʁ dy mɛnil]) is a former commune in the Eure department in Normandy in northern France. On 1 January 2016, it was merged into the new commune of Mesnil-en-Ouche.

== See also ==
- Communes of the Eure department
