= Saint-Aubin-des-Hayes =

- Part of Mesnil-en-Ouche
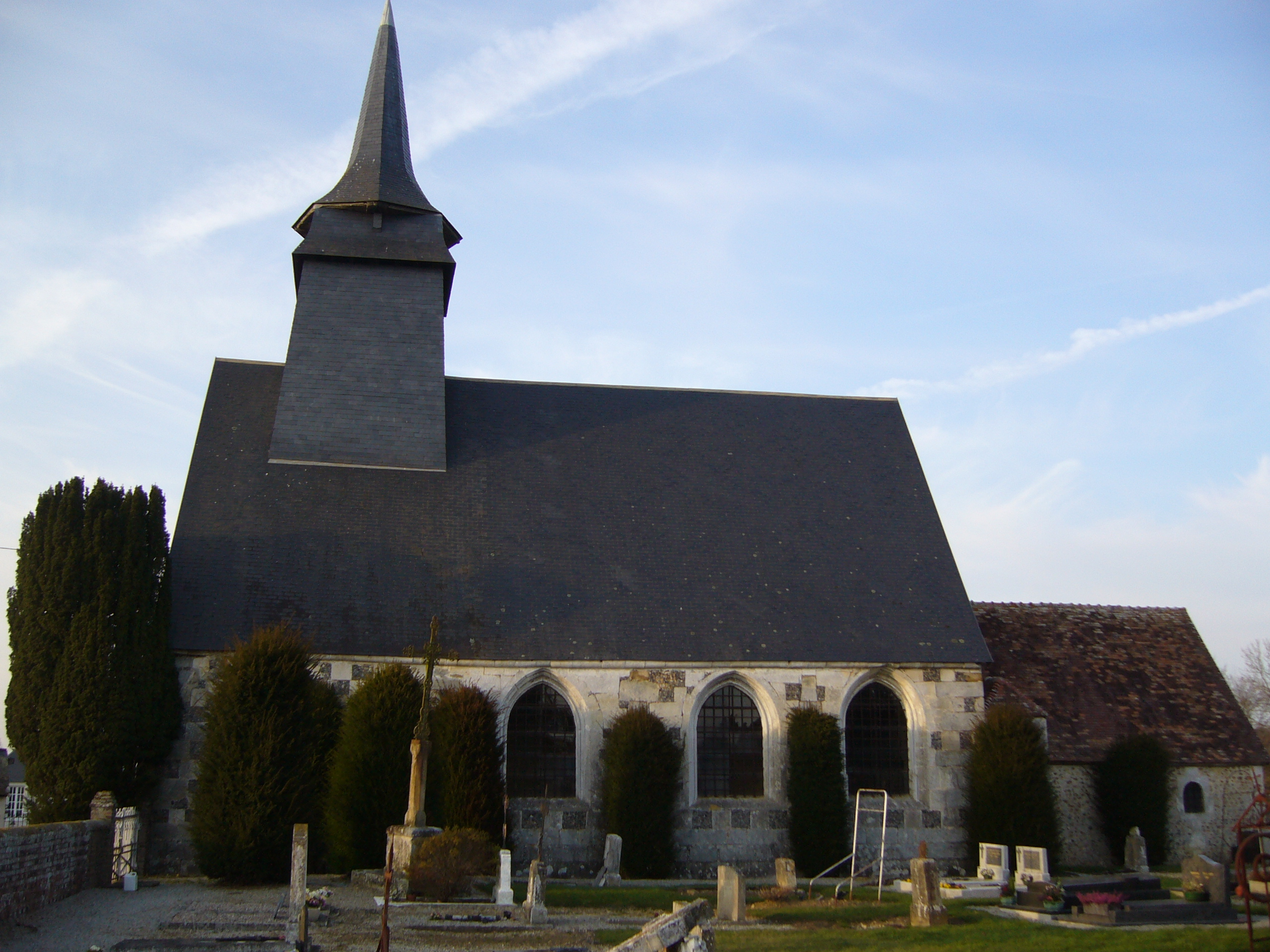
- Saint-Aubin Church with Irish Yews
- Location of Saint-Aubin-des-Hayes
- Location within France Location within Normandy
- Coordinates: 49°00′36″N 0°40′46″E
- Country: France
- Region: Normandy
- Department: Eure
- Arrondissement: Bernay
- Canton: Bernay
- Commune: Mesnil-en-Ouche
- Area^{1}: 5.95 km^{2} (2.30 sq mi)
- Elevation: 171 m (561 ft)
- Highest elevation: 186 m (610 ft)
- Lowest elevation: 133 m (436 ft)
- Population (2023): 144
  - Density: 24.2/km^{2} (62.7/sq mi)
- Time zone: UTC+01:00 (CET)
  - Summer (DST): UTC+02:00 (CEST)
- Postal code: 27410
- ^{1} French Land Register data, which excludes lakes, ponds, glaciers > 1 km^{2} (0.386 sq mi or 247 acres) and river estuaries.

Saint-Aubin-des-Hayes (French pronunciation: [sɛ̃.t‿obɛ̃ de ɛ]) is a former commune in the Eure department in Normandy in northern France. On 1 January 2016, it was merged into the new commune of Mesnil-en-Ouche.

== See also ==
- Communes of the Eure department
