= La Barre-en-Ouche =

- Part of Mesnil-en-Ouche
- Coat of arms
- Location of La Barre-en-Ouche
- Location within France Location within Normandy
- Coordinates: 48°56′48″N 0°39′59″E
- Country: France
- Region: Normandy
- Department: Eure
- Arrondissement: Bernay
- Canton: Bernay
- Commune: Mesnil-en-Ouche
- Area^{1}: 17.34 km^{2} (6.70 sq mi)
- Elevation: 201 m (659 ft)
- Highest elevation: 206 m (676 ft)
- Lowest elevation: 158 m (518 ft)
- Population (2023): 833
  - Density: 48.0/km^{2} (124/sq mi)
- Time zone: UTC+01:00 (CET)
  - Summer (DST): UTC+02:00 (CEST)
- Postal code: 27330
- ^{1} French Land Register data, which excludes lakes, ponds, glaciers > 1 km^{2} (0.386 sq mi or 247 acres) and river estuaries.

La Barre-en-Ouche (French pronunciation: [la baʁ ɑ̃.n‿uʃ], literally La Barre in Ouche) is a former commune in the Eure department in Normandy in northern France. On 1 January 2016, it was merged into the new commune of Mesnil-en-Ouche.

== See also ==
- Communes of the Eure department
