= Granchain =

- Part of Mesnil-en-Ouche
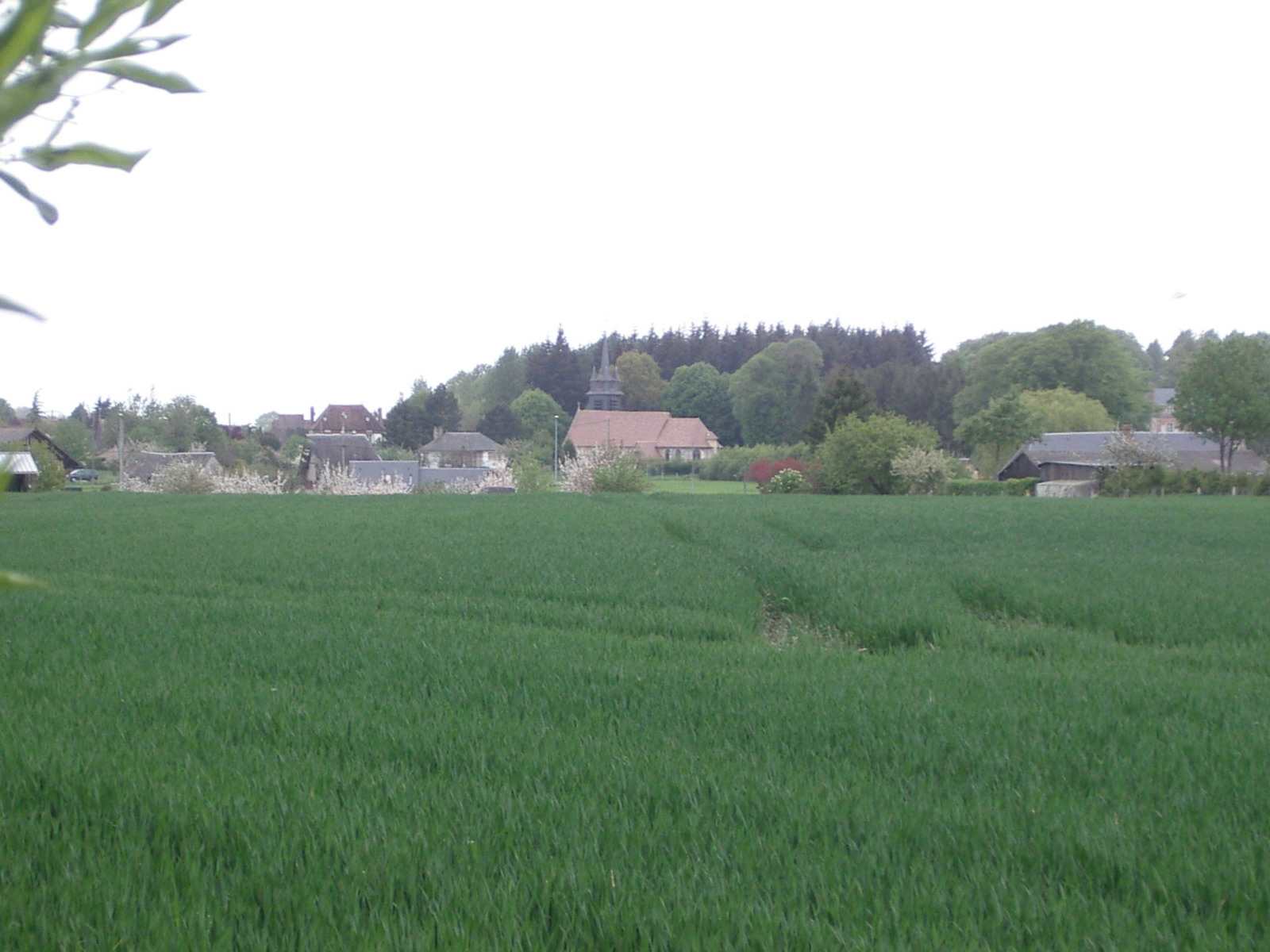
- Location of Granchain
- Location within France Location within Normandy
- Coordinates: 49°02′28″N 0°39′34″E
- Country: France
- Region: Normandy
- Department: Eure
- Arrondissement: Bernay
- Canton: Bernay
- Commune: Mesnil-en-Ouche
- Area^{1}: 8.12 km^{2} (3.14 sq mi)
- Elevation: 160 m (520 ft)
- Highest elevation: 174 m (571 ft)
- Lowest elevation: 144 m (472 ft)
- Population (2023): 214
  - Density: 26.4/km^{2} (68.3/sq mi)
- Time zone: UTC+01:00 (CET)
  - Summer (DST): UTC+02:00 (CEST)
- Postal code: 27410
- ^{1} French Land Register data, which excludes lakes, ponds, glaciers > 1 km^{2} (0.386 sq mi or 247 acres) and river estuaries.

Granchain (French pronunciation: [ɡʁɑ̃ʃɛ̃]; before October 2008: Grandchain) is a former commune in the Eure department in northern France. On 1 January 2016, it was merged into the new commune of Mesnil-en-Ouche.

== See also ==
- Communes of the Eure department
