= Épinay, Eure =

Épinay
- Part of Mesnil-en-Ouche
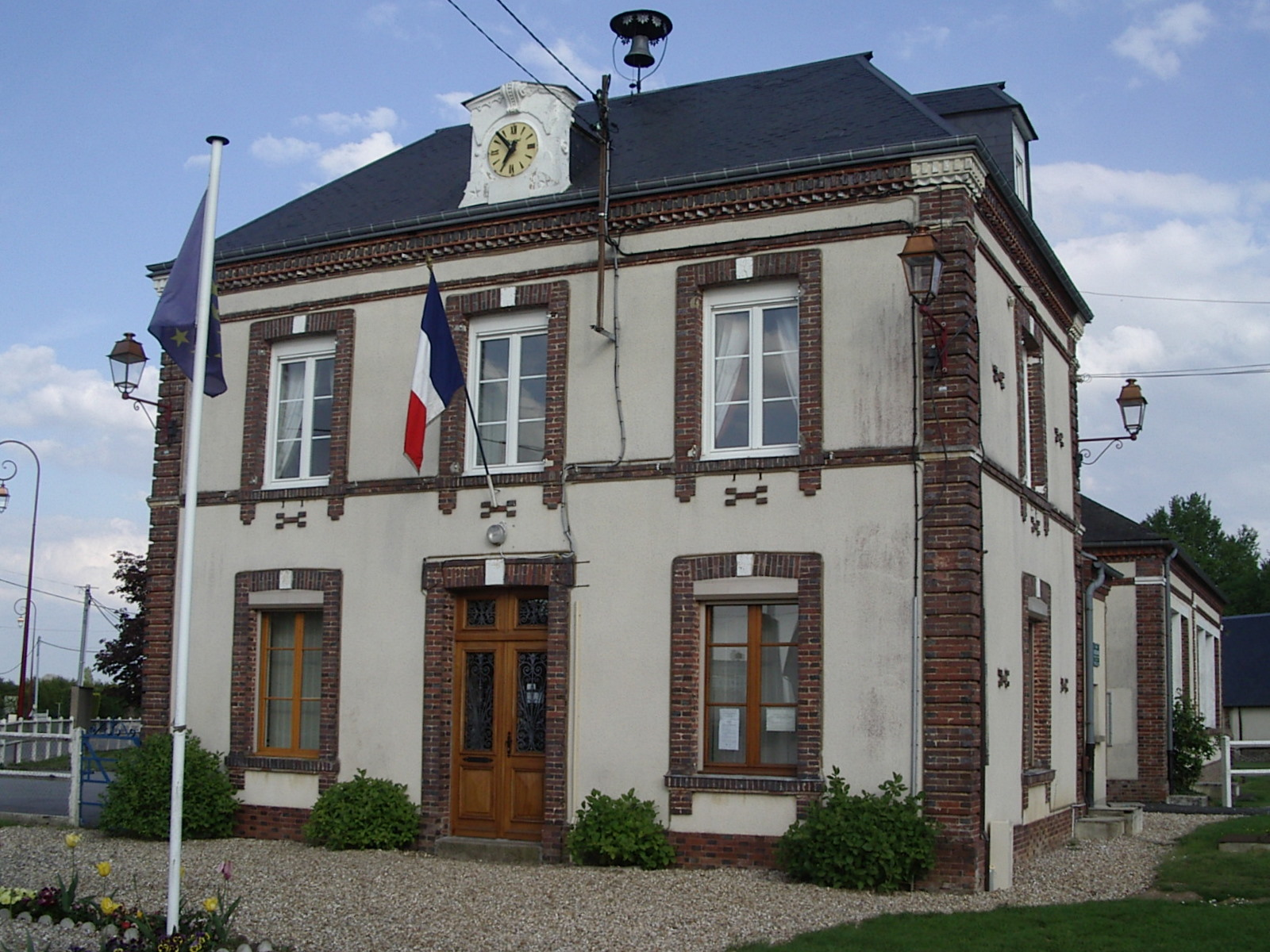
- Town hall (19th century)
- Location of Épinay
- Location within France Location within Normandy
- Coordinates: 48°58′55″N 0°38′34″E
- Country: France
- Region: Normandy
- Department: Eure
- Arrondissement: Bernay
- Canton: Bernay
- Commune: Mesnil-en-Ouche
- Area^{1}: 13.54 km^{2} (5.23 sq mi)
- Elevation: 193 m (633 ft)
- Highest elevation: 194 m (636 ft)
- Lowest elevation: 148 m (486 ft)
- Population (2023): 288
  - Density: 21.3/km^{2} (55.1/sq mi)
- Time zone: UTC+01:00 (CET)
  - Summer (DST): UTC+02:00 (CEST)
- Postal code: 27330
- ^{1} French Land Register data, which excludes lakes, ponds, glaciers > 1 km^{2} (0.386 sq mi or 247 acres) and river estuaries.

Épinay (French pronunciation: [epinɛ]) is a former commune in the Eure department in the Normandy region in north-western France. On 1 January 2016, it was merged into the new commune of Mesnil-en-Ouche.

== See also ==
- Communes of the Eure department
