= Landepéreuse =

- Part of Mesnil-en-Ouche
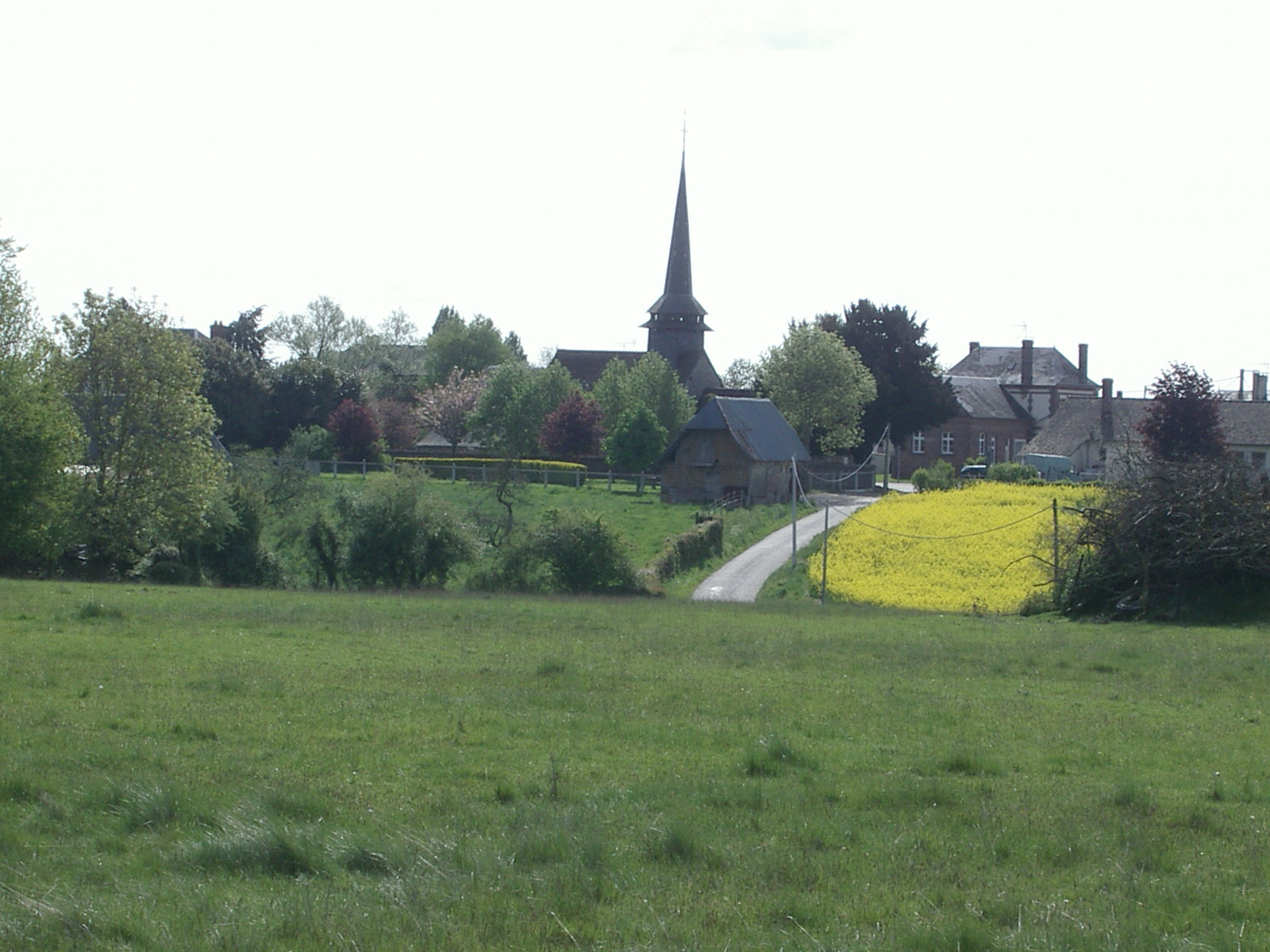
- Location of Landepéreuse
- Location within France Location within Normandy
- Coordinates: 49°00′19″N 0°38′21″E
- Country: France
- Region: Normandy
- Department: Eure
- Arrondissement: Bernay
- Canton: Bernay
- Commune: Mesnil-en-Ouche
- Area^{1}: 8.92 km^{2} (3.44 sq mi)
- Elevation: 188 m (617 ft)
- Highest elevation: 192 m (630 ft)
- Lowest elevation: 139 m (456 ft)
- Population (2023): 370
  - Density: 41/km^{2} (110/sq mi)
- Time zone: UTC+01:00 (CET)
  - Summer (DST): UTC+02:00 (CEST)
- Postal code: 27410
- ^{1} French Land Register data, which excludes lakes, ponds, glaciers > 1 km^{2} (0.386 sq mi or 247 acres) and river estuaries.

Landepéreuse (French pronunciation: [lɑ̃dpeʁøz]) is a former commune in the Eure department, in Normandy in northern France. On 1 January 2016, it was merged into the new commune of Mesnil-en-Ouche.

== Etymology ==
The name "Landepereuse" derives from the Norman pronunciation of lande pierreuse ("stony ground"). The word lande comes from the Gaulish language, and refers to dry ground where few plants grow. "Stony" refers to the local abundance and size of stones.

== Geography ==
Landepéreuse is a small rural village in the Pays d'Ouche, located in the south-western Eure. Its surface is 892 hectares. Its maximum altitude change is 48 m but ranges between 187 m in the south-west and 139 m in the north-east; the town hall is at 170 m. This slightly undulating countryside is characteristic of the topography in the Pays d'Ouche, already hinted at in the hills of the Perche country to the south and the Pays d'Auge a few kilometres to the west. The landscape is made up of fields, pastures, orchards and woods. These are sometimes separated by hedges, mostly hawthorn or blackthorn (sloe).

The territory of the commune is crossed by two dry valleys:

- The first, topographically largest, crosses a small area of the territory, between Landepéreuse and Hiette in the north, and Dupinière and Nobletière in the south. It is uneven here, its northern slope steep and reaching 20m.
- The second, known in the past as the Valley of Theil-en-Ouche, the largest in surface, runs from the south-west to the north-eastern across most of the commune. It starts in Pontaurey at between 186 and 187m in altitude, passes below Longue Pierre in the old territory of Theil-en-Ouche at about 175 m of altitude, then crosses the small northern pocket of the commune of Epinay near the place named Sbirée. It passes between Pasnière and Fortinière in the north and Hamel in the south, at about 168m. It passes north of the village, below the church, at about 165m. (A few years ago, a small bridge spanned it on the #13 road.) Last, it leaves the commune north of Boulaye at an altitude of 158m. Its topography is still not very pronounced here, but the total depth of the channel at this point is about 30m.

Since the middle of the 1980s, an underground drain has run down the middle of this valley.

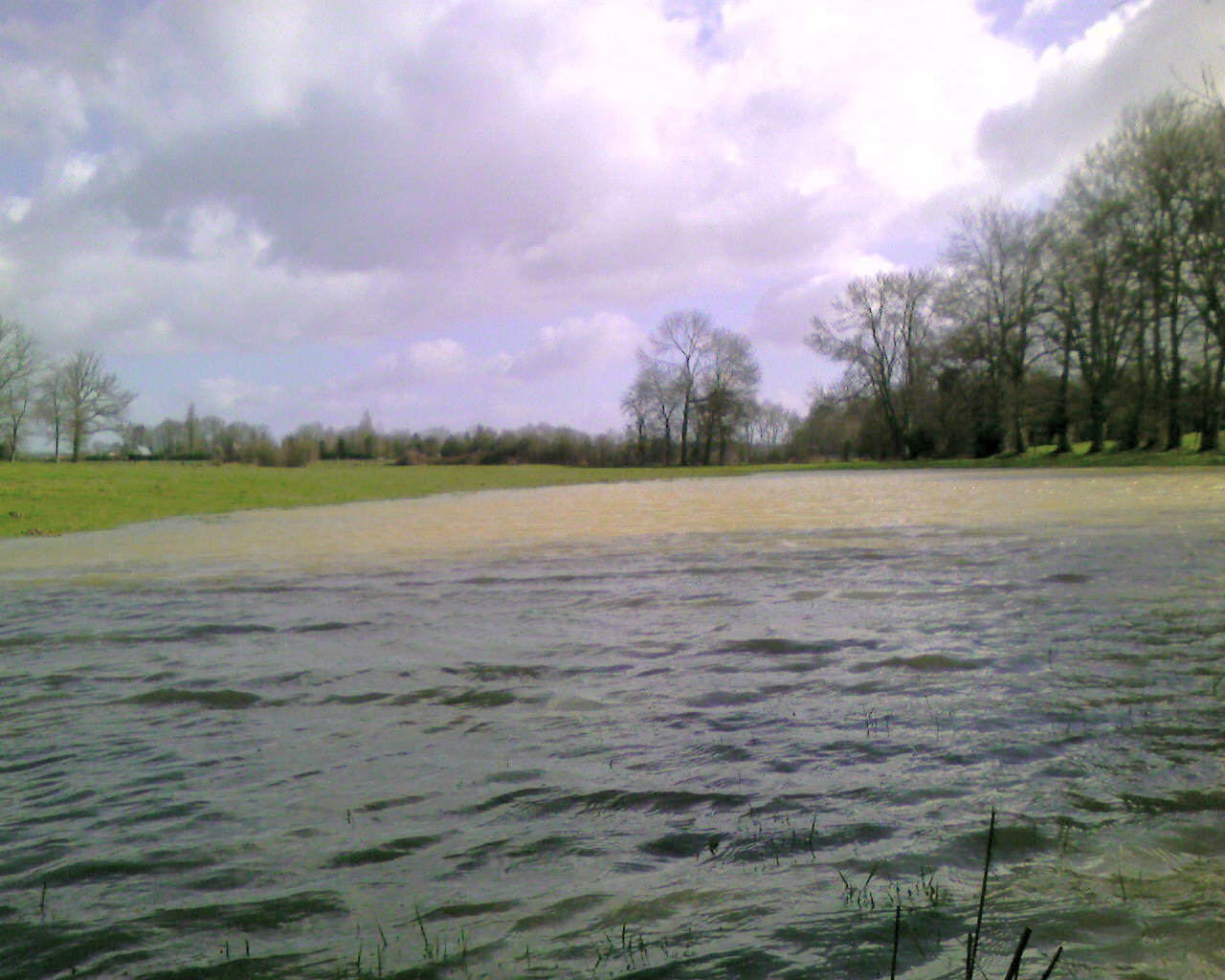
A river runs through the valley in January 2008

Regularly, every year after thunder storms, water runs in these two dry river valleys for a few hours, up to a few days sometimes. During a very rainy episode at the beginning of 2001 (floods in the Somme), for several months rivers ran down the dry valleys to the east of town as well.

== Geology ==
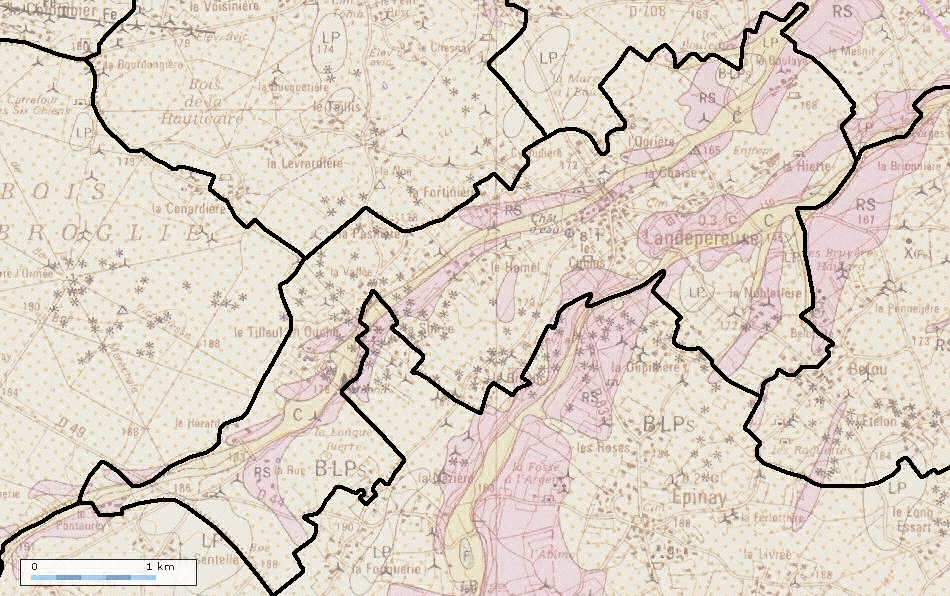
Landepéreuse geological map. Five-pointed stars represent sandstone, those with three-pointed branches, the bétous, or (superficial karst). LP : limestone C : colluvium RS : residual formations

The geological underpinnings of the commune consist of the geological strata commonly encountered in the Paris Basin ("o.b..") from the latter primary to the Holocene. Only rare rocks and formations are, or have been, accessible to humans. The oldest are from the upper Cretaceous.

They are formed of marly chalk, formerly mined in underground quarries, which are long since abandoned. We can see in the landscape, the old collapsed wells and the cave-ins, locally known as bétous (or boitous): (bétoires in French).

On the surface, some areas of the commune have abundant sandstone of Cenozoic age. They can grow to several metres in size. No fossils (macro or micro) have been observed, so their age cannot be precisely determined. To some authors they appear to be Paleocene sandstone, such as those visible at the top of the surrounding chalk cliffs of Dieppe, Le Tréport, and nearby Le Bosc-Renoult. To others, they appear to be Oligocene sandstone, like the well known examples in the Fontainebleau forest south of Paris or the Séran rock in the Vexin. A scientific study cut many thin blades from the rock to try to resolve this ambiguity. It found only one crystallised charophyte oogone (seaweed reproductive cell) which was not datable.

The valleys contain heterogeneous rocks (flint, pure sandstone, more or less strongly ferruginated sandstone...), heterometric (centimetric to pluridecimetric). This geological set recalls alluvium, inheritance of the past valley's activity, with a relatively high current speed (such as the Charentonne today).

Other parts of the commune are covered in limestone, not very thick compared to that in the Lieuvin or in the Campagne d'Evreux. This layer is somewhat more fertile.

Because of the abundance of sandstone, gravel and cailloutis (coarse gravel), Landepéreuse would not have been a paradise for its first inhabitants: the land was probably difficult to clear and cultivate, at a time when tractors didn't exist and iron or even tools of any metal were rare and expensive. By the fineness of the limestone, this commune was, before the advent of organic fertilizers, a land of extensive and subsistence farming. Therefore, geology is the origin of the landscape of this typical bocaged village of the Pays d'Ouche.

clay and limestone, decalcified and here of brown color, concentrated by the paedogenesis (lehm), could however be used to make bricks in the village.

== History ==
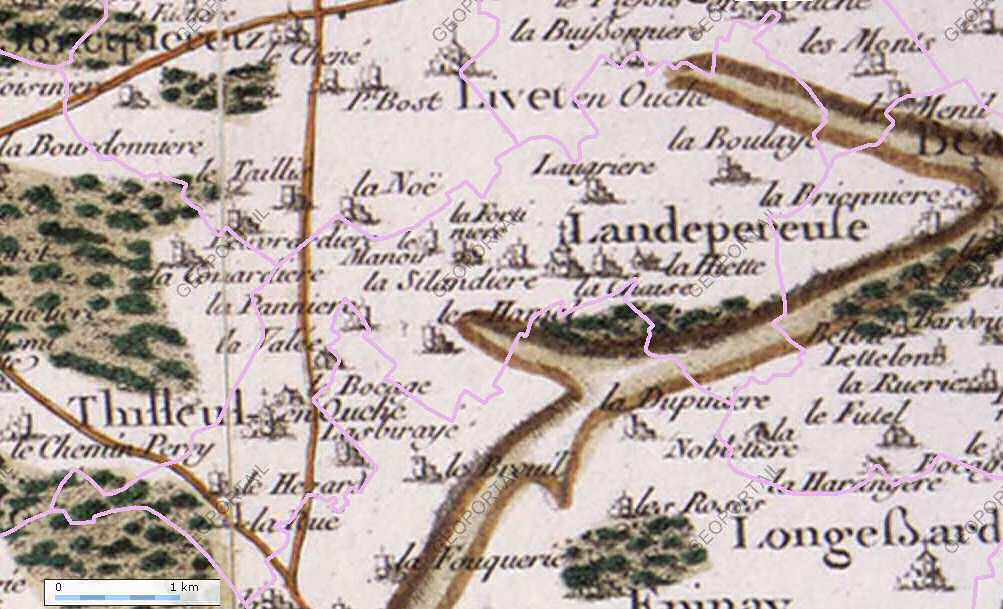
Landepereuse (current boundaries in pink) on the Cassini map, circa 1780

Landepéreuse was given to the abbey of Bernay in 1027 by Richard II, Duke of Normandy, grandfather of William the Bastard (in Norman; later William the Conqueror, in English and French).

The location was shown on the Cassini map of France in the 18th century. The map also shows that some of the hamlets currently nearby already existed: Le Breuil, La Silandière, La Hiette, La Chaise, Le Hamel, and La Pannière. The Cassini map also provides information on the importance of the village of Landepereuse. No primary road seems to cross the village of the time. Two important roads on the map pass nearby, close to Tilleul-en-Ouche. The first runs from Les Jonquerets to Chambord. Today it has become a very minor local road. The other, from Broglie to La Barre-en-Ouche is still important today. The road from Bernay/La Barre-en-Ouche, relatively high-traffic today, if it existed at the time, was not large enough to note.

In the 18th century, a brick factory existed in the commune. The clergy house built at the end of the century, was built of bricks from this factory.

In 1845, Landepereuse grew with the addition of the little village of Tilleul-en-Ouche, located in the small pocket to the south-west of the current village. In the 1950s, the inhabitants, or their representatives, officially requested a name change for the village, from Landepereuse to Landepéreuse.

== See also ==
- Communes of the Eure department
