= Mesnil-en-Ouche =

- Commune
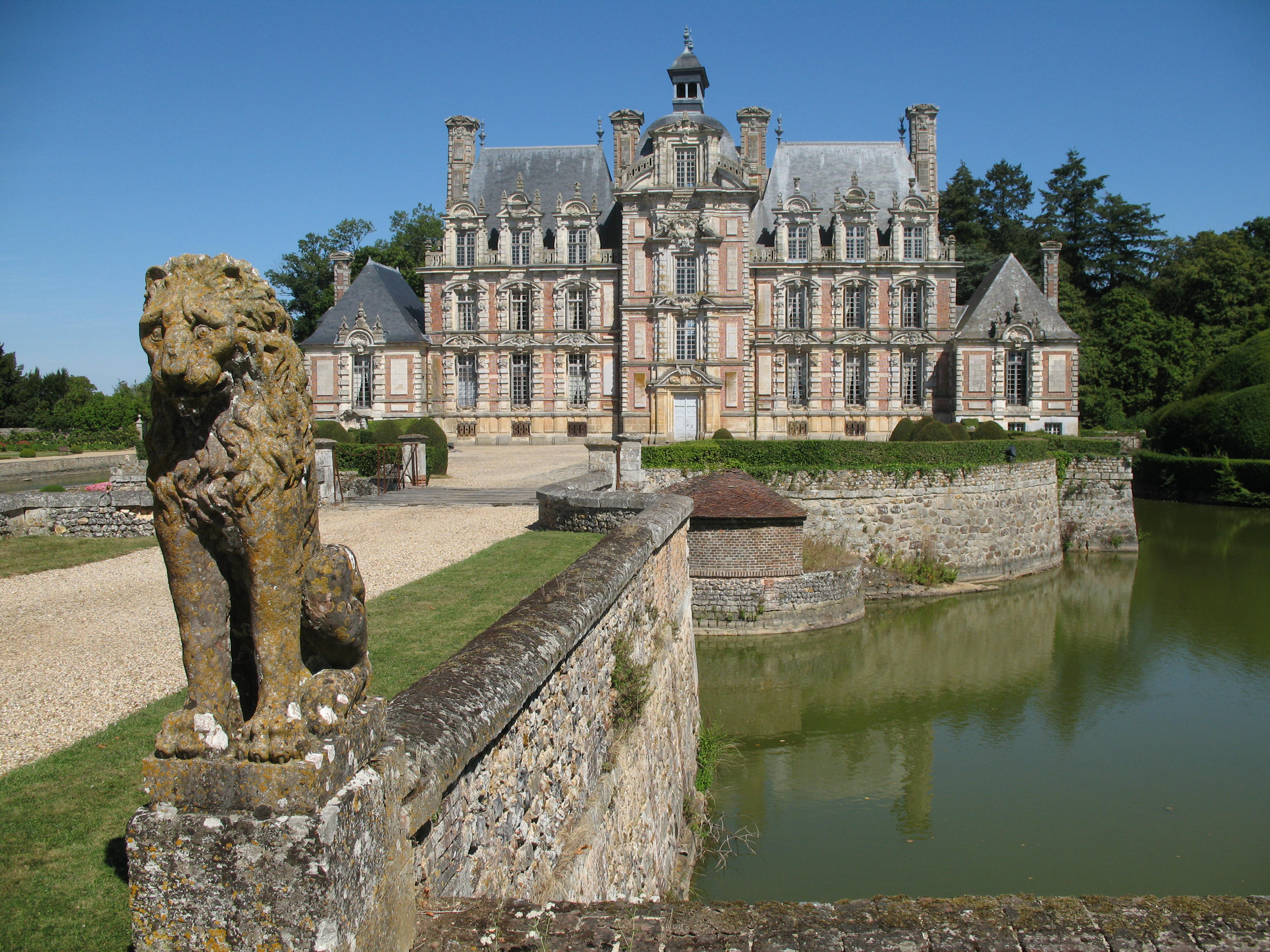
- The château of Beaumesnil, in Mesnil-en-Ouche
- Location of Mesnil-en-Ouche
- Location within France Location within Normandy
- Coordinates: 49°00′47″N 0°42′22″E
- Country: France
- Region: Normandy
- Department: Eure
- Arrondissement: Bernay
- Canton: Bernay

Government
  - Mayor (2020–2026): Jean-Louis Madelon
- Area^{1}: 165.40 km^{2} (63.86 sq mi)
- Population (2023): 4,414
  - Density: 26.69/km^{2} (69.12/sq mi)
- Time zone: UTC+01:00 (CET)
  - Summer (DST): UTC+02:00 (CEST)
- INSEE/Postal code: 27049 /27410, 27330, 27270
- ^{1} French Land Register data, which excludes lakes, ponds, glaciers > 1 km^{2} (0.386 sq mi or 247 acres) and river estuaries.

Mesnil-en-Ouche (French pronunciation: [menil ɑ̃.n‿uʃ], literally Mesnil in Ouche) is a commune in the department of Eure, northern France. The municipality was established on 1 January 2016 by merger of the 16 former communes of Ajou, La Barre-en-Ouche, Beaumesnil (the seat), Bosc-Renoult-en-Ouche, Épinay, Gisay-la-Coudre, Gouttiéres, Granchain, Jonquerets-de-Livet, Landepéreuse, La Roussière, Saint-Aubin-des-Hayes, Saint-Aubin-le-Guichard, Sainte-Marguerite-en-Ouche, Saint-Pierre-du-Mesnil and Thevray.

== Geography ==
The commune along with another 69 communes shares part of a 4,747 hectare, Natura 2000 conservation area, called Risle, Guiel, Charentonne.

== Population ==
Population data refer to the commune in its geography as of January 2025.

Historical population
Year	Pop.	±% p.a.
1968	4,102	—
1975	3,791	−1.12%
1982	3,823	+0.12%
1990	3,716	−0.35%
1999	4,047	+0.95%
2007	4,473	+1.26%
2012	4,765	+1.27%
2017	4,684	−0.34%
2023	4,414	−0.98%
Source: INSEE

== See also ==
- Communes of the Eure department
