= Sainte-Marguerite-en-Ouche =

- Part of Mesnil-en-Ouche
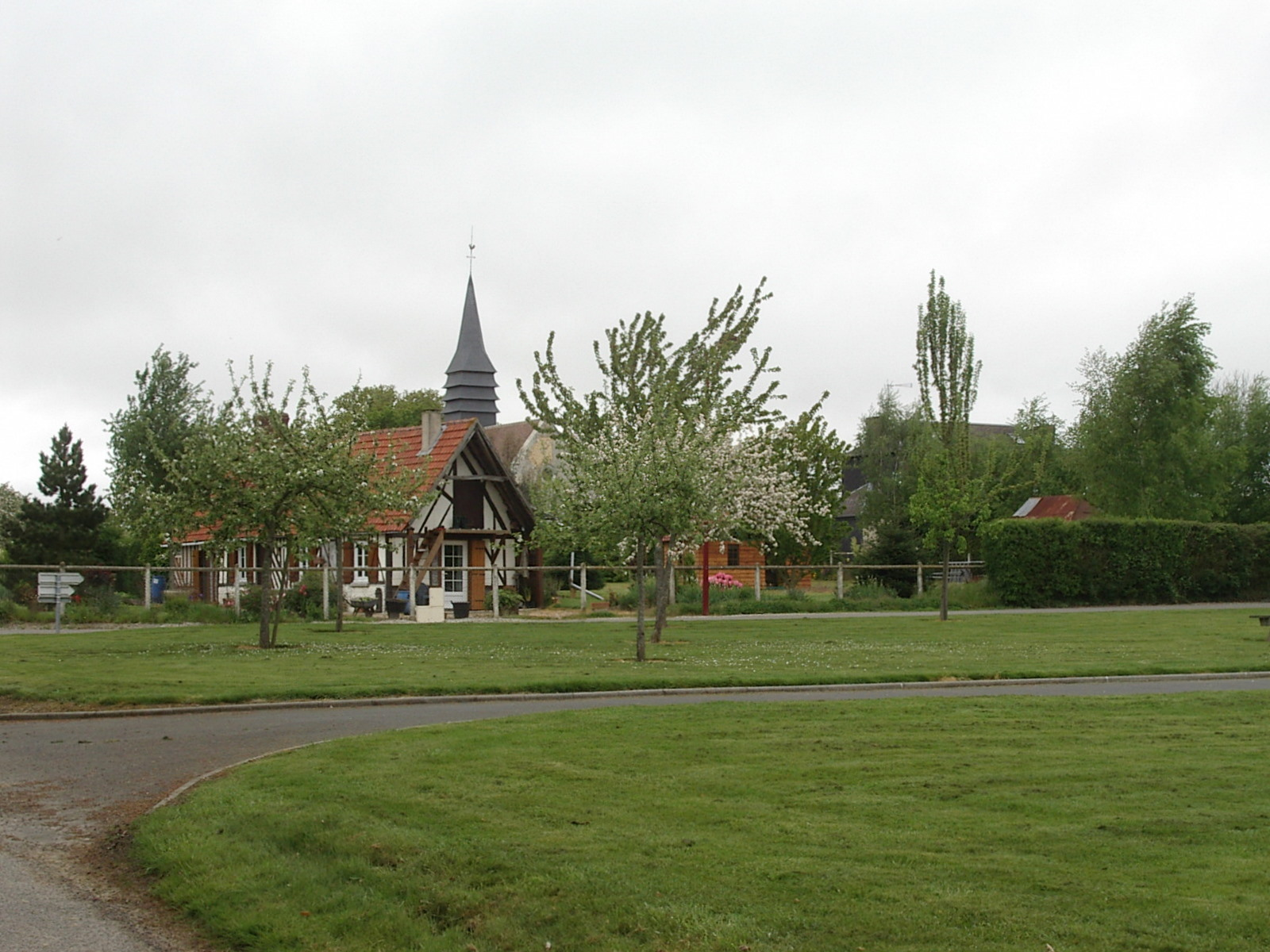
- Location of Sainte-Marguerite-en-Ouche
- Location within France Location within Normandy
- Coordinates: 49°01′31″N 0°39′31″E
- Country: France
- Region: Normandy
- Department: Eure
- Arrondissement: Bernay
- Canton: Bernay
- Commune: Mesnil-en-Ouche
- Area^{1}: 5.35 km^{2} (2.07 sq mi)
- Elevation: 158 m (518 ft)
- Highest elevation: 175 m (574 ft)
- Lowest elevation: 135 m (443 ft)
- Population (2023): 93
  - Density: 17/km^{2} (45/sq mi)
- Time zone: UTC+01:00 (CET)
  - Summer (DST): UTC+02:00 (CEST)
- Postal code: 27410
- ^{1} French Land Register data, which excludes lakes, ponds, glaciers > 1 km^{2} (0.386 sq mi or 247 acres) and river estuaries.

Sainte-Marguerite-en-Ouche (French pronunciation: [sɛ̃t maʁɡərit ɑ̃.n‿uʃ], literally Sainte-Marguerite in Ouche) is a former commune in the Eure department in Normandy in northern France. On 1 January 2016, it was merged into the new commune of Mesnil-en-Ouche.

== See also ==
- Communes of the Eure department
