= La Roussière =

- Part of Mesnil-en-Ouche
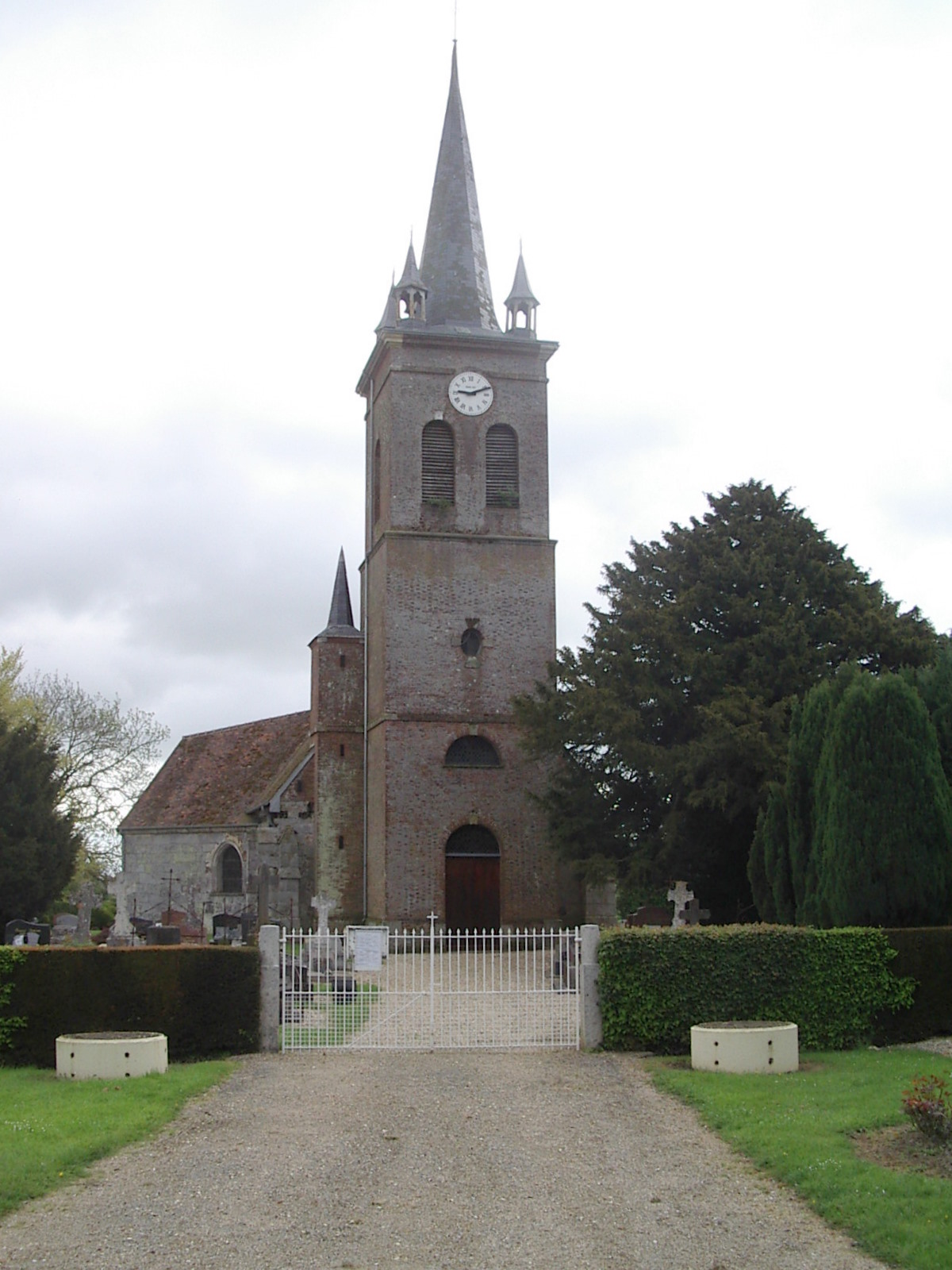
- Location of La Roussière
- Location within France Location within Normandy
- Coordinates: 48°57′44″N 0°34′51″E
- Country: France
- Region: Normandy
- Department: Eure
- Arrondissement: Bernay
- Canton: Bernay
- Commune: Mesnil-en-Ouche
- Area^{1}: 10.23 km^{2} (3.95 sq mi)
- Elevation: 172 m (564 ft)
- Highest elevation: 204 m (669 ft)
- Lowest elevation: 169 m (554 ft)
- Population (2023): 209
  - Density: 20.4/km^{2} (52.9/sq mi)
- Time zone: UTC+01:00 (CET)
  - Summer (DST): UTC+02:00 (CEST)
- Postal code: 27270
- ^{1} French Land Register data, which excludes lakes, ponds, glaciers > 1 km^{2} (0.386 sq mi or 247 acres) and river estuaries.

La Roussière (French pronunciation: [la ʁusjɛʁ]) is a former commune in the Eure department in northwestern France. On 1 January 2016, it was merged into the new commune of Mesnil-en-Ouche.

== See also ==
- Communes of the Eure department
