= Bosc-Renoult-en-Ouche =

- Part of Mesnil-en-Ouche
- Location of Bosc-Renoult-en-Ouche
- Location within France Location within Normandy
- Coordinates: 48°57′02″N 0°42′32″E
- Country: France
- Region: Normandy
- Department: Eure
- Arrondissement: Bernay
- Canton: Bernay
- Commune: Mesnil-en-Ouche
- Area^{1}: 7.85 km^{2} (3.03 sq mi)
- Elevation: 24 m (79 ft)
- Highest elevation: 189 m (620 ft)
- Lowest elevation: 132 m (433 ft)
- Population (2023): 136
  - Density: 17.3/km^{2} (44.9/sq mi)
- Time zone: UTC+01:00 (CET)
  - Summer (DST): UTC+02:00 (CEST)
- Postal code: 27330
- ^{1} French Land Register data, which excludes lakes, ponds, glaciers > 1 km^{2} (0.386 sq mi or 247 acres) and river estuaries.

Bosc-Renoult-en-Ouche (French pronunciation: [bo ʁənu ɑ̃.n‿uʃ], literally Bosc-Renoult in Ouche) is a former commune in the Eure department in Normandy in northern France. On 1 January 2016, it was merged into the new commune of Mesnil-en-Ouche.

== See also ==
- Communes of the Eure department
