= Nigel d'Aubigny of Cainhoe =

Norman knight

Nigel d'Aubigny (died shortly bef. 1100) was a Norman knight, and supporter of William I of England. His name is frequently mentioned in the Domesday Book of 1086 in connection with lands in what is now Bedfordshire. He almost certainly built and lived in Cainhoe Castle, a small motte-and-bailey structure to the east of Ampthill.

The traditional placement of Nigel within the Norman Aubigny family is untenable, and Loyd instead suggested that he was son of William, lord of Saint-Martin-d'Aubigny, Normandy, and hence brother both of Richard d'Aubigny, monk of Lessay, abbot of St. Albans (d. 1119), and of Roger d'Aubigny, father of William d'Aubigny Pincerna. He married Amicia, daughter of Henry de Ferrers, lord of Longueville, and a major landholder in England. Nigel and Amicia had children: Henry, his father's heir, William, Nigel, and Adeliza, probably wife of Richard Fitz Osborn.
