= Ajou, Eure =

Ajou
- Part of Mesnil-en-Ouche
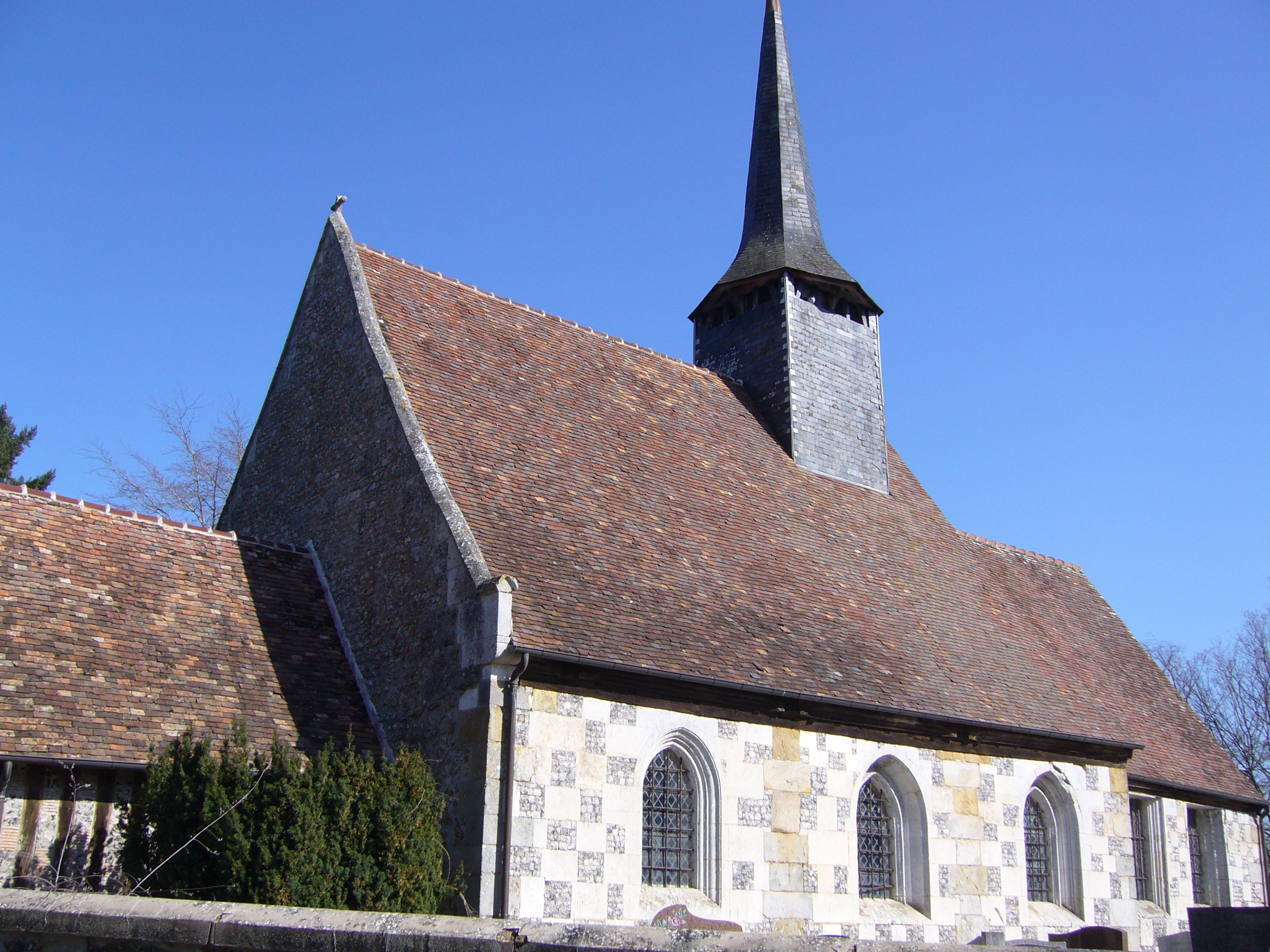
- Saint-Aubin Church, now belonging to Ajou
- Location of Ajou
- Location within France Location within Normandy
- Coordinates: 48°58′49″N 0°46′59″E
- Country: France
- Region: Normandy
- Department: Eure
- Arrondissement: Bernay
- Canton: Bernay
- Commune: Mesnil-en-Ouche
- Area^{1}: 9.83 km^{2} (3.80 sq mi)
- Elevation: 144 m (472 ft)
- Highest elevation: 179 m (587 ft)
- Lowest elevation: 115 m (377 ft)
- Population (2021): 256
  - Density: 26.0/km^{2} (67.5/sq mi)
- Time zone: UTC+01:00 (CET)
  - Summer (DST): UTC+02:00 (CEST)
- Postal code: 27410
- ^{1} French Land Register data, which excludes lakes, ponds, glaciers > 1 km^{2} (0.386 sq mi or 247 acres) and river estuaries.

Ajou (French pronunciation: [aʒu]) is a former commune in the Department of Eure in Normandy. It is located in northern France. On 1 January 2016, it was merged into the new commune of Mesnil-en-Ouche.

== Population ==
Historical population
Year	Pop.	±% p.a.
2006	238	—
2011	256	+1.47%
2021	256	+0.00%
Source: INSEE

== See also ==
- Communes of the Eure department
