= Oakham Castle =

Historic building in Oakham, Rutland

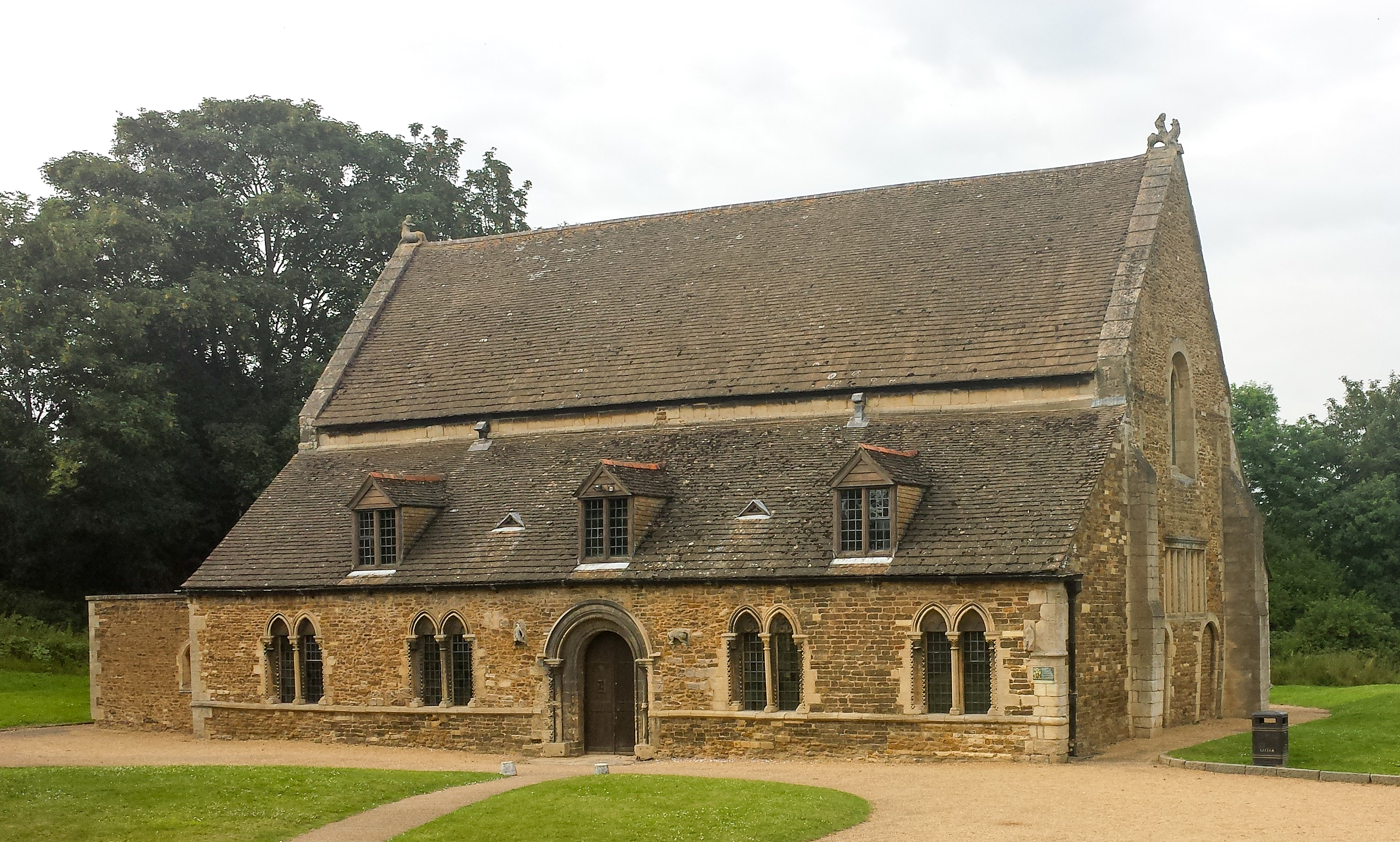
- The Great Hall of Oakham Castle 2014

- Location within Rutland
- Maps 52.670957°N 0.727449°W
- Location: Oakham, Rutland

History
- Built: 12th century

Listed Building – Grade I
- Designated: 8 May 1950
- Reference no.: 1073277

Oakham Castle is a historic building in Oakham, Rutland. The castle is known for its collection of massive horseshoes and is also recognised as one of the best examples of domestic Norman architecture in England. It is a Grade I listed building. Owned and managed by the Rutland County Council, Oakham Castle is licensed for civil ceremonies. Admission to the castle is free.

== History ==
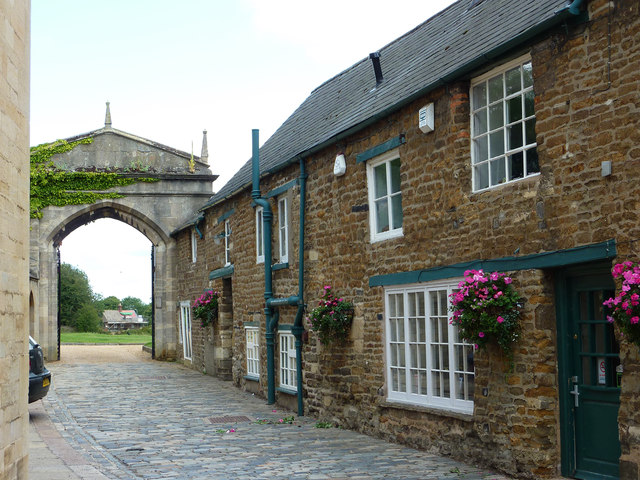
Castle Lane leading from the Market Place to Oakham Castle

The castle was built between 1180 and 1190 by Walkelin de Ferrers, lord of the manor of Oakham, and a great nephew of Robert de Ferrers, 1st Earl of Derby. The Great Hall comprises a nave and two arcaded aisles, each with three large stone columns. There are a number of 12th-century sculptures decorating the hall including six musicians that are supported by the columns. The sculptures are carved from local stone quarried at Clipsham and are believed to have been made by masons who had also worked at Canterbury Cathedral.

Oakham Castle is one of the longest-running seats of justice in England; a Crown Court has been held in the castle every two years since 1229.

The present gateway into the market place closely resembles the gateways at Burley-on-the-Hill, and is thought to have been erected by George Villiers, 1st Duke of Buckingham in the early 17th century.

Following the implementation of the Local Government Act 1888, which established county councils in every county, it became the meeting place for Rutland County Council and remained as such until the county council moved to Catmose House in 1936.

Time Team, the Channel 4 archaeology series, filmed at Oakham Castle 26–28 June 2012; the programme was shown on 10 February 2013.

The castle was temporarily closed for an extensive restoration of the castle, including the curtain wall. Oakham Castle was awarded a £2.165 million grant from the Heritage Lottery Fund in 2014 following a joint bid by Rutland County Council, Oakham Town Council and the Friends of Rutland County Museum. The castle reopened on 30 May 2016.

== Description ==
Due to its small size, Oakham Castle does not represent the traditional image of a castle. However, what is now called Oakham Castle was originally the Great Hall of a much larger fortified manor house. This had many of the traditional features of a castle such as a curtain wall, a gatehouse and a drawbridge with iron chains. There is also historical and archaeological evidence to suggest that Oakham Castle possessed towers at strategic points along the walls as well as a moat. An illustration in Mediaeval England edited by H. W. C. Davis suggests that the doorway shown to be in the centre of the wall was originally where the window at the end on the right now is. Also, there are no dormer windows in the illustration.

== The horseshoes ==
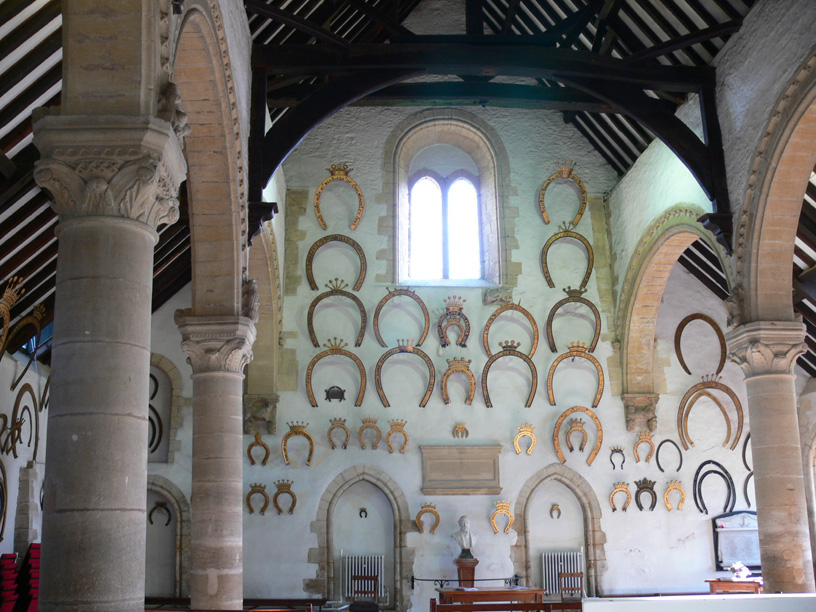
Horseshoes on the east wall of the Great Hall

There remains a unique tradition that peers of the realm should forfeit a horseshoe to the Lord of the Manor of Oakham on their first visit to the town. Two hundred and thirty horseshoes currently decorate the walls of Oakham Castle. It is thought that this tradition is linked to the de Ferrers' family name; Ferrier was the Norman French word for farrier and the horseshoe has been a symbol of the de Ferrers family since Henry de Ferrers arrived in England in 1066. A horseshoe, orientated in accordance with county custom as the horseshoes are hung in the castle, is used as a symbol of the county of Rutland and appears on the arms of the county council and on the flag of Rutland.

The oldest surviving horseshoe in the collection is one that was presented by Edward IV in 1470 after his victory at the Battle of Losecoat Field. Recent additions to the collection are horseshoes presented by the Princess Royal in 1999, the Prince of Wales in 2003, Princess Alexandra in 2005, the Duchess of Cornwall in 2014, and the Duke and Duchess of Edinburgh in 2024.
