= Walkelin de Derby =

Norman lord of Egginton, Derbyshire (c. 1135 – 1190)

Walkelin de Derby (c. 1135 – 1190), also known as Walkelin de Ferrieres, anglicized as Walkelin de Ferrers, was a Norman lord of Egginton in the English county of Derbyshire. He was the last moneyer of the Derby Mint and the principal founder of Derby School.

== Life ==
Walkelin is believed to have been born in about 1135, the son of Robert de Ferrers, 2nd Earl of Derby and his wife, Margaret Peverel. In 1162, he married Goda de Toeni (born about 1141), the daughter and heiress of Robert de Toeni of Eggington in Derbyshire, and settled in the county. They had at least two children, Margery (born about 1165) and Isabel (born about 1172). According to some reports, Walkelin died in 1190 at the Siege of Acre, Jerusalem. Others place his death at Oakham Castle in Rutland, although this probably refers to his second cousin, Walkelin de Ferrers, the lord of Oakham.

== Derby School ==
The ancient Derby School may have been first established by William de Barbâ Aprilis and Walter Durdant, Bishop of Lichfield, in the reign of Henry II. It was re-founded in the second half of the 12th century by Walkelin and his wife, Goda, who gave their own house to be used for the school. However, there is no firm information on where the house was.

Magna Britannia says of Derby School -

Whilst Richard Peche, who succeeded Walter Durdant in 1162, was Bishop of Lichfield, Walkelin de Derby and Goda his wife gave the mansion in which they dwelt, and which Walkelin had purchased of William Alsin, to the canons of Derley, on condition that the hall should be for ever used as a school-room, and the chambers for the dwelling of the master and clerks.
