= Cainhoe Castle =

11th-century castle in Bedfordshire, England

- Clophill, Bedfordshire, England
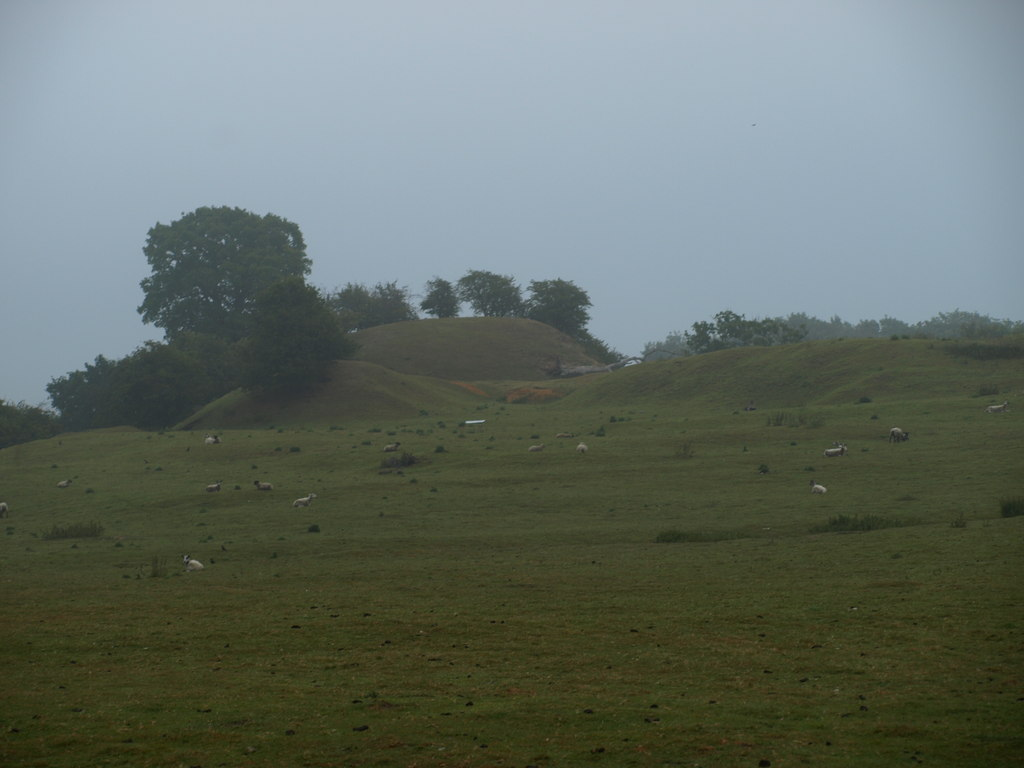
- Earthworks of Cainhoe Castle

Site information
- Type: Castle
- Condition: Earthworks

Location
- Shown within Bedfordshire, England
- Coordinates: 52.0242°N 0.4026°W
- Grid reference: grid reference TL097374

Cainhoe Castle was an 11th-century Norman castle, located near the village of Clophill, in the county of Bedfordshire, England.

Cainhoe Castle was a motte and triple bailey castle, built by Nigel d'Aubigny, a Norman Knight, sometime after the Norman Invasion (1066). It was not mentioned in the Domesday Book of 1086;

"Cainou: Nigel d'Aubigny; Thurstan from Avelina, Ralph Tailbois' wife. Mill."

The d'Aubigny family, known for being deeply involved in the crusades, used the castle as the seat of the Barony of Cainhoe. The castle was to stay in the d'Aubigny family until the death of Simon d'Aubigny, who died without a male heir, in 1272. It then passed to the de Lacys and the Nortons, and then on to the Greys, Earls of Kent.

The castle was occupied until the time of the Black Death (1348), when all the inhabitants died of the disease. The castle, and the small village that had built up around it, were discovered abandoned sometime later.

By 1374 the castle was in ruins. The site was excavated in 1973, 1985 and 1986. Only earthworks remain. The site is a Scheduled Monument.

== See also ==
- Castles in Great Britain and Ireland
- List of castles in England
