= Gouttières, Eure =

Gouttières
- Part of Mesnil-en-Ouche
- Location of Gouttières
- Location within France Location within Normandy
- Coordinates: 49°01′29″N 0°44′45″E
- Country: France
- Region: Normandy
- Department: Eure
- Arrondissement: Bernay
- Canton: Bernay
- Commune: Mesnil-en-Ouche
- Area^{1}: 5.14 km^{2} (1.98 sq mi)
- Elevation: 155 m (509 ft)
- Highest elevation: 171 m (561 ft)
- Lowest elevation: 109 m (358 ft)
- Population (2023): 175
  - Density: 34.0/km^{2} (88.2/sq mi)
- Time zone: UTC+01:00 (CET)
  - Summer (DST): UTC+02:00 (CEST)
- Postal code: 27410
- ^{1} French Land Register data, which excludes lakes, ponds, glaciers > 1 km^{2} (0.386 sq mi or 247 acres) and river estuaries.

Gouttières (French pronunciation: [ɡutjɛʁ]) is a former commune in the Eure department in northern France. On 1 January 2016, it was merged into the new commune of Mesnil-en-Ouche.

== See also ==
- Communes of the Eure department
