= Henry de Ferrers =

Norman magnate and administrator (died c. 1100)

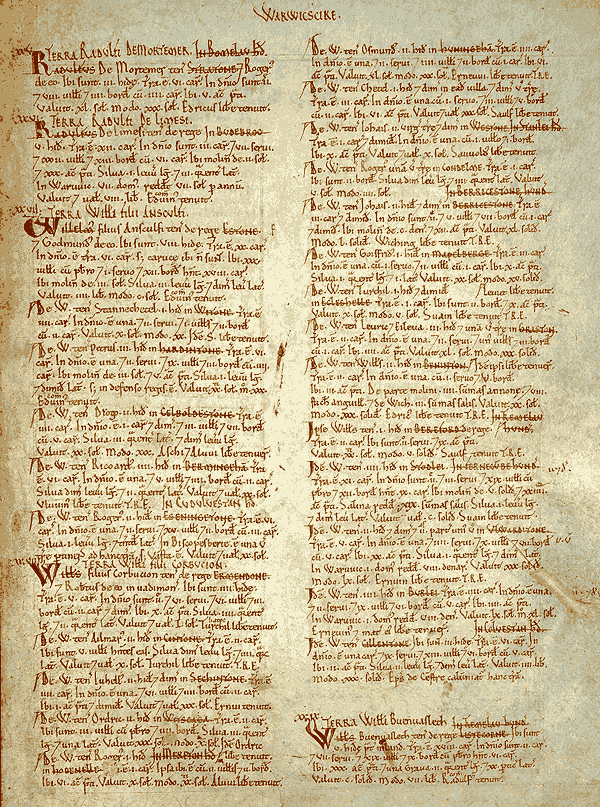
"The Domesday Book records over 200 manors given to Henry de Ferrers"

Henry de Ferrers (died by 1100), magnate and administrator, was a Norman who, after the 1066 Norman Conquest, was awarded extensive lands in England.

== Origins ==
Henry was the eldest son of Vauquelin de Ferrers and, in about 1040, inherited his father's lands centred on the village of Ferrières-Saint-Hilaire.

== Career ==
In England, Henry progressively acquired landholdings, which he had to manage. As one of the leading magnates, he also served King William I of England and his successor William II in administrative capacities and is said to have been castellan of Stafford Castle. In about 1080, he and his wife founded Tutbury Priory in Staffordshire, and in 1086 he was one of the royal commissioners in charge of the Domesday survey, which records his 210 manors.

Henry died between September 1093 and September 1100 and was buried in Tutbury Priory.

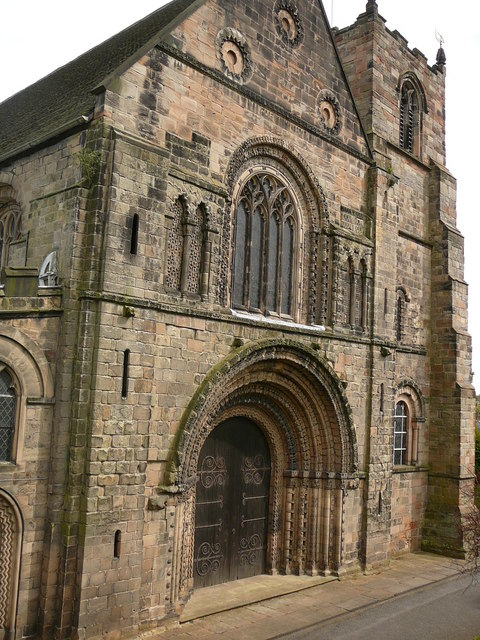
West front of the former priory, now St Mary's Church, Tutbury

== Landholdings ==
Henry's first three tranches of land came to him from dispossessed English holders. First, in about 1066 or 1067, he was granted the lands of Goderic, the former sheriff of Berkshire, in Berkshire and Wiltshire. Then, by about the end of 1068, he obtained lands in Buckinghamshire, Buttsbury in Essex, and Northamptonshire, as well as more in Berkshire, that had belonged to Bondi the Staller. Finally, after the 1071 revolt, he was awarded the lands of Siward Barn in Derbyshire, Gloucestershire, Nottinghamshire, and Warwickshire as well as further lands in Berkshire and Essex. Also after the revolt, he became holder of the Wapentake of Appletree centred on Tutbury Castle, which had been in the hands of Hugh d'Avranches and stretched across Derbyshire, Leicestershire and Staffordshire.

Among Henry's under-tenants were members of families believed to have come from villages near his original home at Ferrières-Saint-Hilaire, such as the Curzons from Notre-Dame-de-Courson, the Baskervilles from Saint-Martin-de-Boscherville and the Levetts from Jonquerets-de-Livet.

== Family ==
Henry and his wife Bertha had four known children:

1. William, probably the eldest, who inherited the estates in Normandy and was a supporter of Duke Robert Curthose.
2. Enguenulph, keeper of Duffield Castle in Derbyshire, who did not long outlive his father.
3. Robert, who inherited the estates in England and was made Earl of Derby.
4. Amice, who married Nigel d'Aubigny of Cainhoe, probable builder of Cainhoe Castle in Bedfordshire.
