= Vauquelin de Ferrers =

Seigneur of Ferrières-Saint-Hilaire

Vauquelin (Walkelin) de Ferrières (d. ca. 1045), was Seigneur of Ferrières-Saint-Hilaire. The Ferrers family holding at Ferrières-Saint-Hilaire was the caput of their large Norman barony.

In 1045, during the anarchy of Duke William's minority, Valquelin fought a battle with Hugh I the Bearded of Montfort-sur-Risle, in which both were killed. Hugh I was the father of Hugh de Montfort. Wace describes the relationship between the two by saying:

'A mighty feud broke out between Walkelin de Ferrieres, and Hugh Lord of Montfort...they waged fierce war with each other, and were not to be reconciled...the rage of each against the other was so great that they fought to the death. I know not which carried himself most gallantly, or who fell the first, but the issue of the affray was that Hugh was slain, and Walkelin fell also; both lost their lives in the same affray, and on the same day.'

By a wife whose identity is unknown, Valquelin had two sons who were supporters of William the Conqueror: Henry de Ferrers, who became a major landowner in England after the conquest, and William.

== Sources ==
Douglas, David C., and Loyd, Lewis C., The Origins of Some Anglo-Norman Families, The Harleian Society, Leeds, 1951

Wace. Chronicles of the Norman Conquest, from the Roman de Rou. Translated by Edgar Taylor. London: William Pickering, 1837.
