= Ferrières-Saint-Hilaire =

- Commune
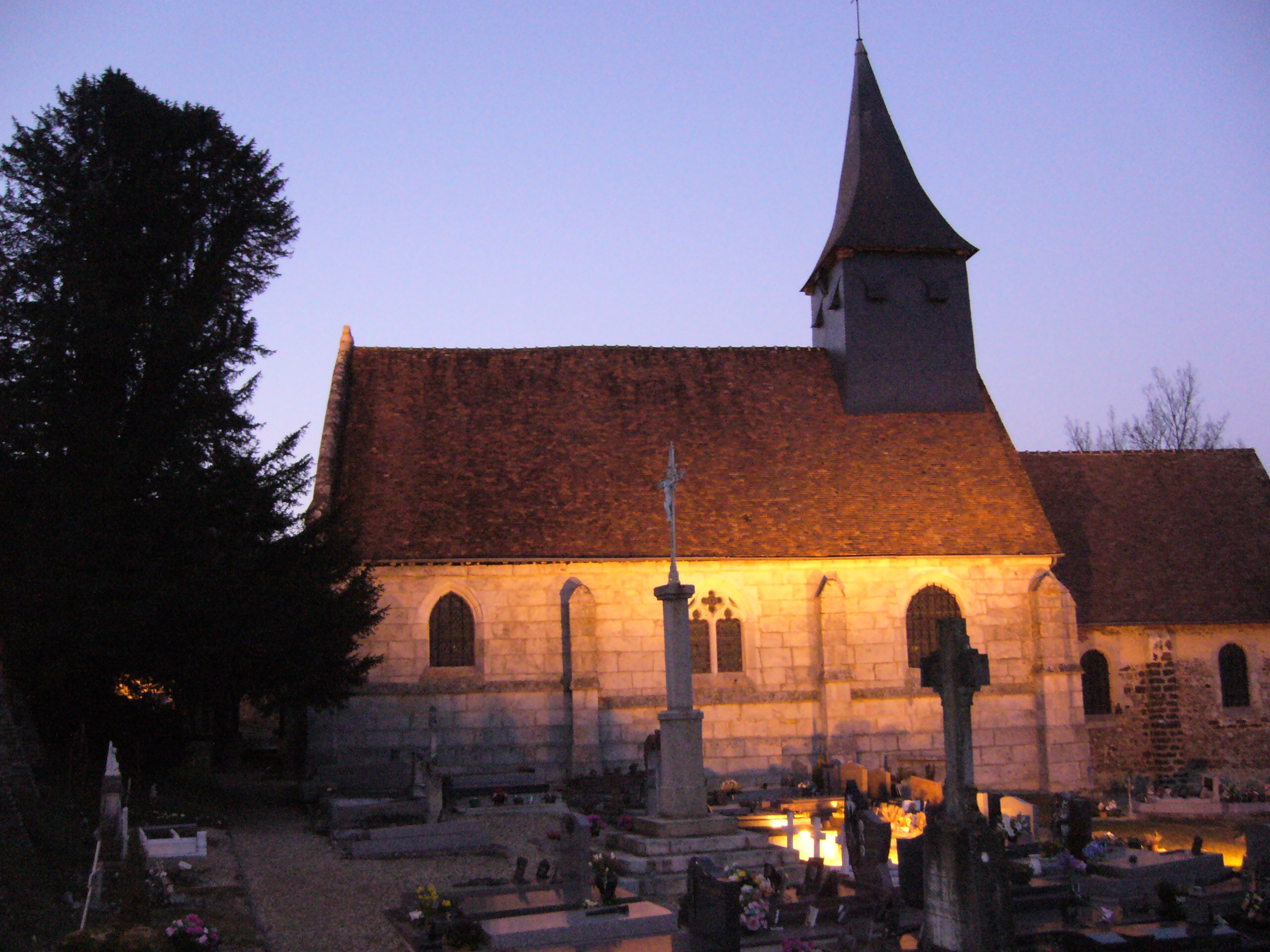
- Saint-Hilaire church and old yew

- Coat of arms
- Location of Ferrières-Saint-Hilaire
- Location within France Location within Normandy
- Coordinates: 49°02′01″N 0°34′06″E
- Country: France
- Region: Normandy
- Department: Eure
- Arrondissement: Bernay
- Canton: Breteuil

Government
  - Mayor (2020–2026): Jean-Luc David
- Area^{1}: 9.84 km^{2} (3.80 sq mi)
- Elevation: 102 m (335 ft)
- Highest elevation: 181 m (594 ft)
- Lowest elevation: 117 m (384 ft)
- Population (2023): 430
  - Density: 44/km^{2} (110/sq mi)
- Time zone: UTC+01:00 (CET)
  - Summer (DST): UTC+02:00 (CEST)
- INSEE/Postal code: 27239 /27270
- ^{1} French Land Register data, which excludes lakes, ponds, glaciers > 1 km^{2} (0.386 sq mi or 247 acres) and river estuaries.

Ferrières-Saint-Hilaire (French pronunciation: [fɛʁjɛʁ sɛ̃.t‿ilɛʁ]) is a commune in the Eure department in the Normandy region in northern France.

== Geography ==
The commune along with another 69 communes shares part of a 4,747 hectare, Natura 2000 conservation area, called Risle, Guiel, Charentonne.

== Population ==
Historical population
Year	Pop.	±% p.a.
1968	238	—
1975	303	+3.51%
1982	372	+2.97%
1990	374	+0.07%
1999	354	−0.61%
2007	391	+1.25%
2012	410	+0.95%
2017	419	+0.44%
2023	430	+0.43%
Source: INSEE

== Personalities ==
- Henry de Ferrers's family came from here before he joined William the Conqueror to invade England. Henry was given over 200 manors. including most of what is now Derbyshire. The Ferrers brought with them to England their Norman underlords, who were the lords of smaller fiefs falling within their barony. Among these were the Curzon (of Notre-Dame-de-Courson), Livet and Baskerville families.

== See also ==
- Communes of the Eure department
- Henry de Ferrers
