= Walchelin de Ferriers =

Anglo-Norman baron and principal captain of King Richard I of England

Walchelin de Ferrieres (or Walkelin de Ferrers) (died 1201) (Latinised to de Ferrariis, literally "from the smiths") was an Anglo-Norman baron and principal captain of King Richard I of England.

== Origins ==
The de Ferriers family is believed to have originated at the manor of Ferrières-Saint-Hilaire in the southern marches of the Duchy of Normandy and had previously protected the duchy from the hostility of the Counts of Maine and Anjou. With the union of the domains of Anjou and Normandy in 1144, and the investment of Geoffrey V Plantagenet as Duke of Normandy, most of this land lost its strategic importance.

Walchelin was the son of Henry de Ferrieres, a nephew of Robert de Ferrers, 1st Earl of Derby and a son of either Enguenulf or William. Like his father, Walchelin held the castles of Ferrières-Saint-Hilaire and Chambray for the service of 5 knights. He held lands equating to 42 3/4 Knight's fees. In England, Walchelin held the manors of Oakham in Rutland and Lechlade in Gloucestershire. He is known to have held these lands since at least 1172.

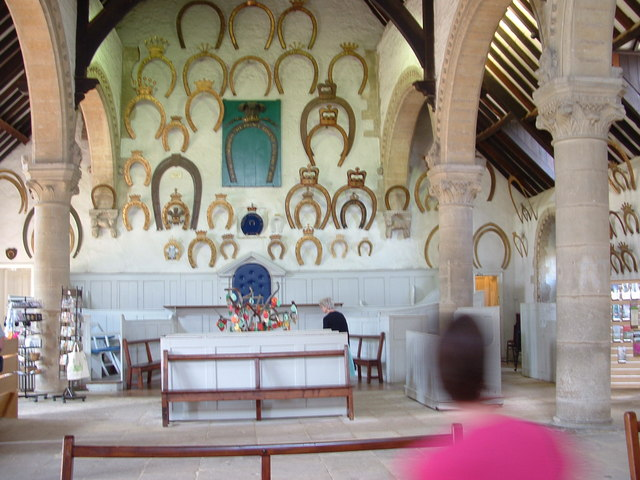
Ceremonial horse-shoes on the walls of Oakham Castle in honour of the de Ferrers family

The cognizance or proto-heraldic device of the family was a horse-shoe, a play on the Latin word ferrarius meaning a "worker in iron" (ferrum) thus a black-smith or farrier. Thus originated the custom, still current today, of the affixing of ceremonial horse-shoes on the walls of the great hall of Oakham Castle to commemorate the visit of a peer or royal. After the start of the age of heraldry (circa 1200-1215), branches of the Ferrers family adopted horse-shoes as charges in their coats of arms.

== Career ==
During the Third Crusade, he and his son and heir, Henry, served in the force of Richard I of England. A John de Ferrieres, believed to be a nephew, was also present. Walchelin had stayed with the King in Sicily. It is apparent that Walchelin was one of the king's counselors. He and his knights arrived at Saint-Jean d'Acre sometime in April or June 1191. Some months previously, William de Ferrers, 3rd Earl of Derby, his second cousin, had been killed at the Siege of Acre.

After the conclusion of the siege, King Richard and Hugh III of Burgundy marched their forces south to the city of Jaffa. Along the route, several skirmishes broke out between the crusaders and the Saracen army marching in parallel under Saladin. On 7 September 1191, the great battle of Arsuf was fought. Richard had made Walchelin a commander of one of the elite bodies of knights, according to the chronicle attributed to Geoffrey de Vinsauf.

Later, in 1194, Richard was imprisoned for ransom in Germany. Walchelin brought the treasure of Normandy to Speyer and gave himself as a hostage (along with many others) to the Western Emperor Henry VI. He was freed from captivity in about 1197. His sons Henry and Hugh managed his estates during the years he spent in prison. Sometime prior to his death, the younger son, Hugh was granted lordship of the manor of Lechlade.

== Death and succession ==
Walchelin died in 1201 and was succeeded by his son, Henry. Henry sided with King John of England over King Philip II of France until December 1203 when John left Normandy, never to return. At this point, Henry did homage to King Philip for his Norman lands. Hugh had left England and the care of Lechlade and Oakham went to his sister, Isabella, who was married to Roger de Mortimer of Wigmore. After her death, the land escheated to the crown as Terra Normanorum.
