= Lottin =

Lottin is a surname. Notable people with the surname include:

- Albert Lottin (born 2001), French football midfielder
- Pierre Lottin, French actor
- Pierre-Victorien Lottin, French archaeologist and painter
- Two brothers:

- Ethan Mbappé Lottin (born 2006), French football midfielder
- Kylian Mbappé Lottin (born 1998), French football forward
