= Saint-Clair-d'Arcey =

- Part of Treis-Sants-en-Ouche
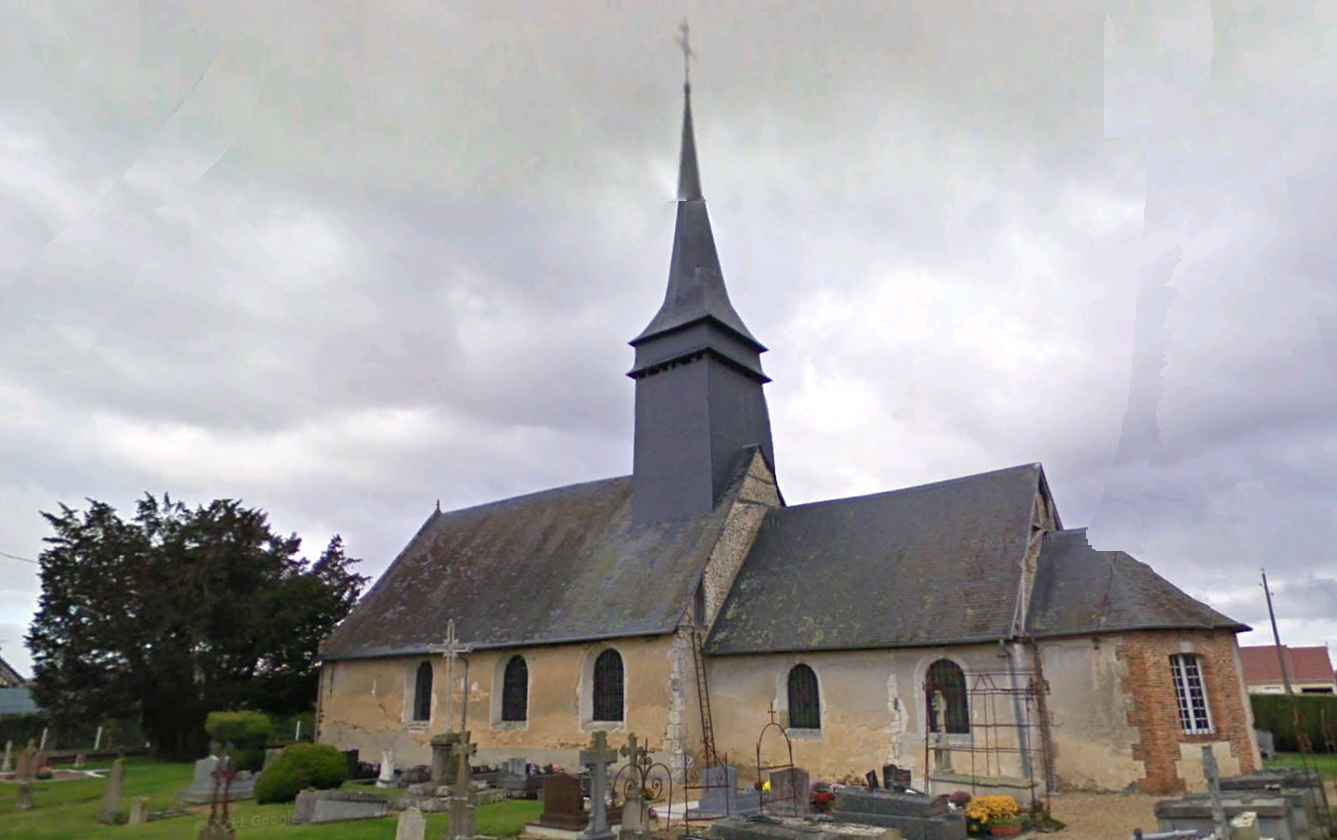
- Location of Saint-Clair-d'Arcey
- Location within France Location within Normandy
- Coordinates: 49°03′55″N 0°39′50″E
- Country: France
- Region: Normandy
- Department: Eure
- Arrondissement: Bernay
- Canton: Bernay
- Commune: Treis-Sants-en-Ouche
- Area^{1}: 11.61 km^{2} (4.48 sq mi)
- Elevation: 160 m (520 ft)
- Highest elevation: 169 m (554 ft)
- Lowest elevation: 95 m (312 ft)
- Population (2023): 330
  - Density: 28/km^{2} (74/sq mi)
- Time zone: UTC+01:00 (CET)
  - Summer (DST): UTC+02:00 (CEST)
- Postal code: 27300
- ^{1} French Land Register data, which excludes lakes, ponds, glaciers > 1 km^{2} (0.386 sq mi or 247 acres) and river estuaries.

Saint-Clair-d'Arcey (French pronunciation: [sɛ̃ klɛːʁ daʁsɛ]) is a former commune in the Eure department in Normandy in northern France. On 1 January 2019, it was merged into the new commune Treis-Sants-en-Ouche.

== See also ==
- Communes of the Eure department
