= Auguste Charpentier =

French painter (1813–1880)

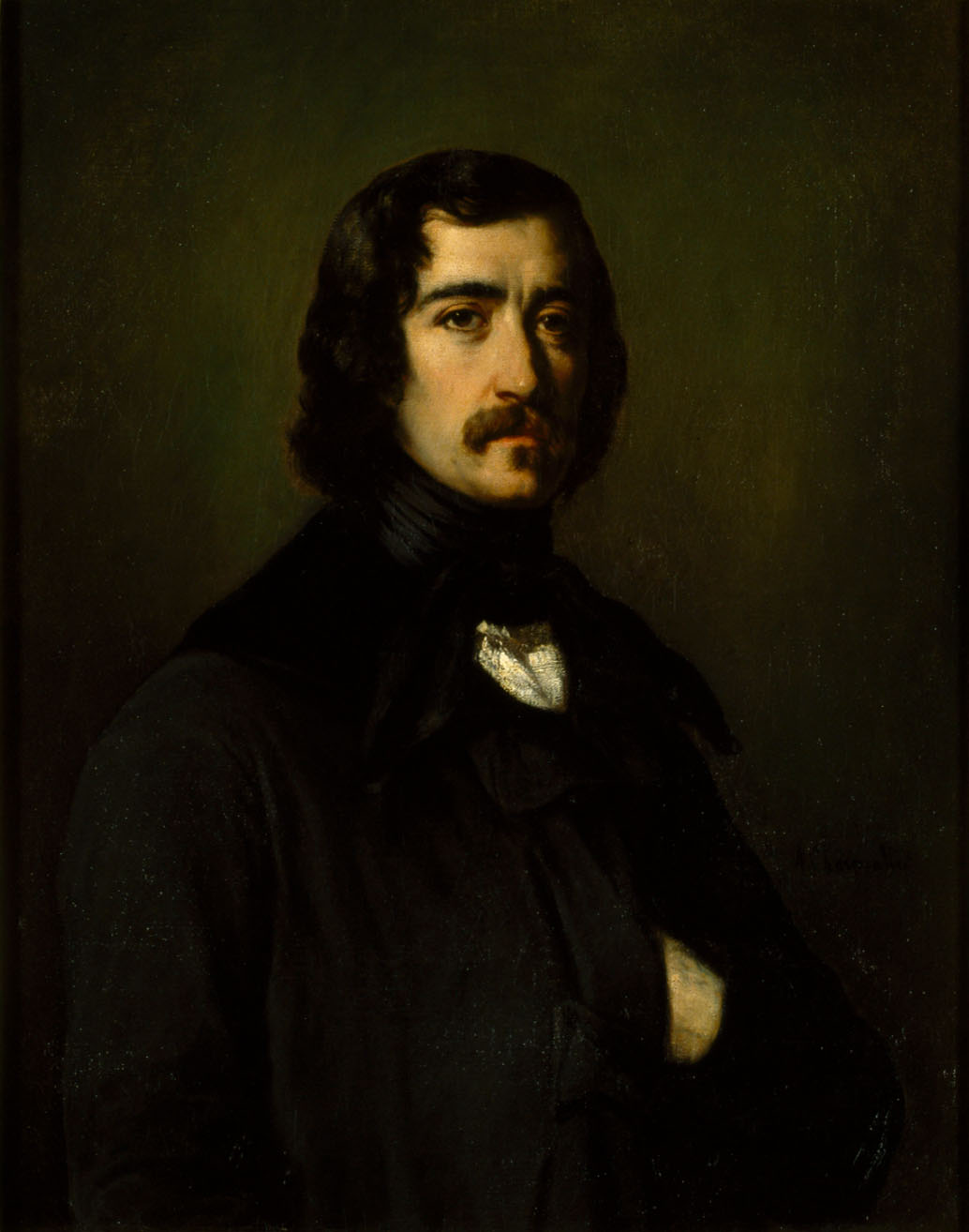
- Born: Auguste Charpentier; 1813; Paris, France
- Died: 1880 (aged 66–67); Paris, France
- Education: École nationale supérieure des beaux-arts, François Gérard, Jean-Auguste-Dominique Ingres
- Known for: Painting, engraving, drawing

Auguste Charpentier (1813–1880) was a French painter. He attained fame under the Second French Empire as a portraitist for numerous celebrities of the time such as George Sand, Mademoiselle Rachel, Narcisse Diaz de la Pena, Alexandre Dumas, and Marie Delaporte.

== Partial list of works ==
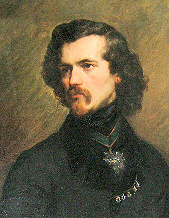
Portrait de Lottin de Laval (1840), Musée des beaux-arts de Bernay.

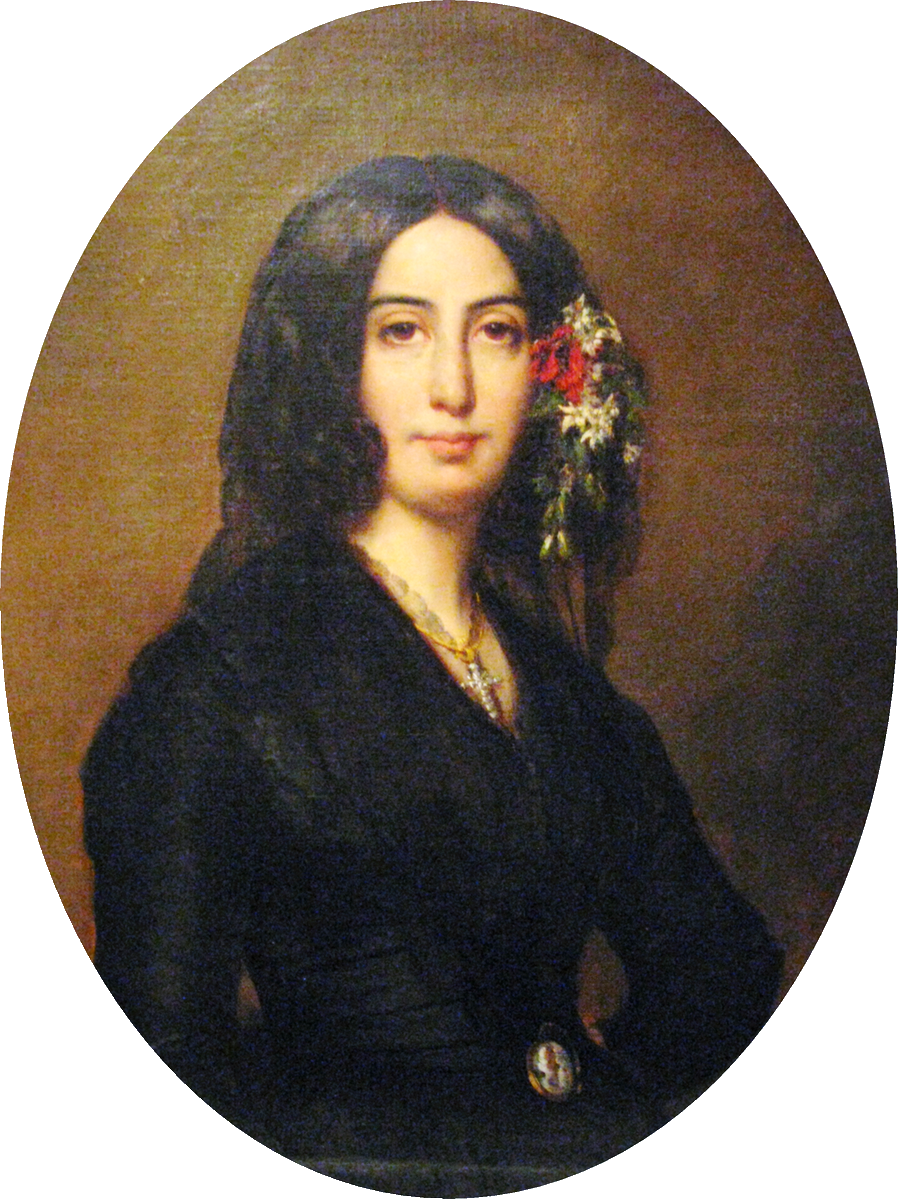
Portrait de George Sand (1838), Paris, musée de la vie romantique.

- Musée des beaux-arts de Caen : Pâtre italien (lost work), oil on canvas
- Musée des beaux-arts de Caen : Courtisane, oil on canvas
- Musée des beaux-arts de Dole : Portrait de Joseph Lyard, oil on canvas
- Grand'Combe-Châteleu, Saint-Joseph Church : Sainte-Madeleine, oil on canvas
- Paris, Saint-Roch Church, ten paintings classified as historical monuments:
  - Les Funérailles, 1833, oil on canvas
  - La Résurrection, oil on canvas
  - Les Saintes Femmes au sépulcre, oil on canvas
  - La Loi divine, oil on canvas
  - L'Innocence, oil on canvas
  - L'Extrême-onction, oil on canvas
  - La Force, oil on canvas
  - La Sagesse, oil on canvas
  - La Charité, oil on canvas
  - La Religion, oil on canvas
- Paris, musée de la vie romantique : Portrait de George Sand, 1838, George Sand et ses amis à Nohan
- Musée des beaux-arts de Rouen : Portrait de Bocage, artiste dramatique, before 1862,
- Musée de Vendôme : Portrait de Charles Mansui
- Musée national des châteaux de Versailles et de Trianon : Narcisse Diaz de la Pena (1808–1878), 1849, oil on canvas
- Musée des beaux-arts de Bernay, Portrait de Pierre-Victorien Lottin de Laval, oil on canvas
