= Plainville =

Plainville is the name of numerous places in the United States of America:

- Plainville, Connecticut
- Plainville, Georgia
- Plainville, Illinois
- Plainville, Indiana
- Plainville, Kansas
- Plainville, Massachusetts
- Plainville, New Jersey
- Plainville, New York
- Plainville, Ohio
- Plainville, Pennsylvania
- Plainville, Wisconsin

It is also the name of two communes and several hamlets in Northern France:

- Plainville (Calvados), ancient commune now included in Percy-en-Auge, Calvados département, Normandy
- Plainville, Eure in the Eure département, Normandy
- Plainville, Oise in the Oise département, Picardy
- Plainville, Hamlet of Marolles-les-Buis in the Eure-et-Loir département, Centre-Val de Loire
