= Saint-Aubin-le-Vertueux =

- Part of Treis-Sants-en-Ouche
- Location of Saint-Aubin-le-Vertueux
- Location within France Location within Normandy
- Coordinates: 49°03′05″N 0°36′25″E
- Country: France
- Region: Normandy
- Department: Eure
- Arrondissement: Bernay
- Canton: Bernay
- Commune: Treis-Sants-en-Ouche
- Area^{1}: 15.12 km^{2} (5.84 sq mi)
- Elevation: 170 m (560 ft)
- Highest elevation: 175 m (574 ft)
- Lowest elevation: 105 m (344 ft)
- Population (2023): 782
  - Density: 51.7/km^{2} (134/sq mi)
- Time zone: UTC+01:00 (CET)
  - Summer (DST): UTC+02:00 (CEST)
- Postal code: 27300
- ^{1} French Land Register data, which excludes lakes, ponds, glaciers > 1 km^{2} (0.386 sq mi or 247 acres) and river estuaries.

Saint-Aubin-le-Vertueux (French pronunciation: [sɛ̃.t‿obɛ̃ lə vɛʁtɥø]) is a former commune in the Eure department in Normandy in northern France. On 1 January 2019, it was merged into the new commune Treis-Sants-en-Ouche.

== See also ==
- Communes of the Eure department
