= Caorches-Saint-Nicolas =

- Commune
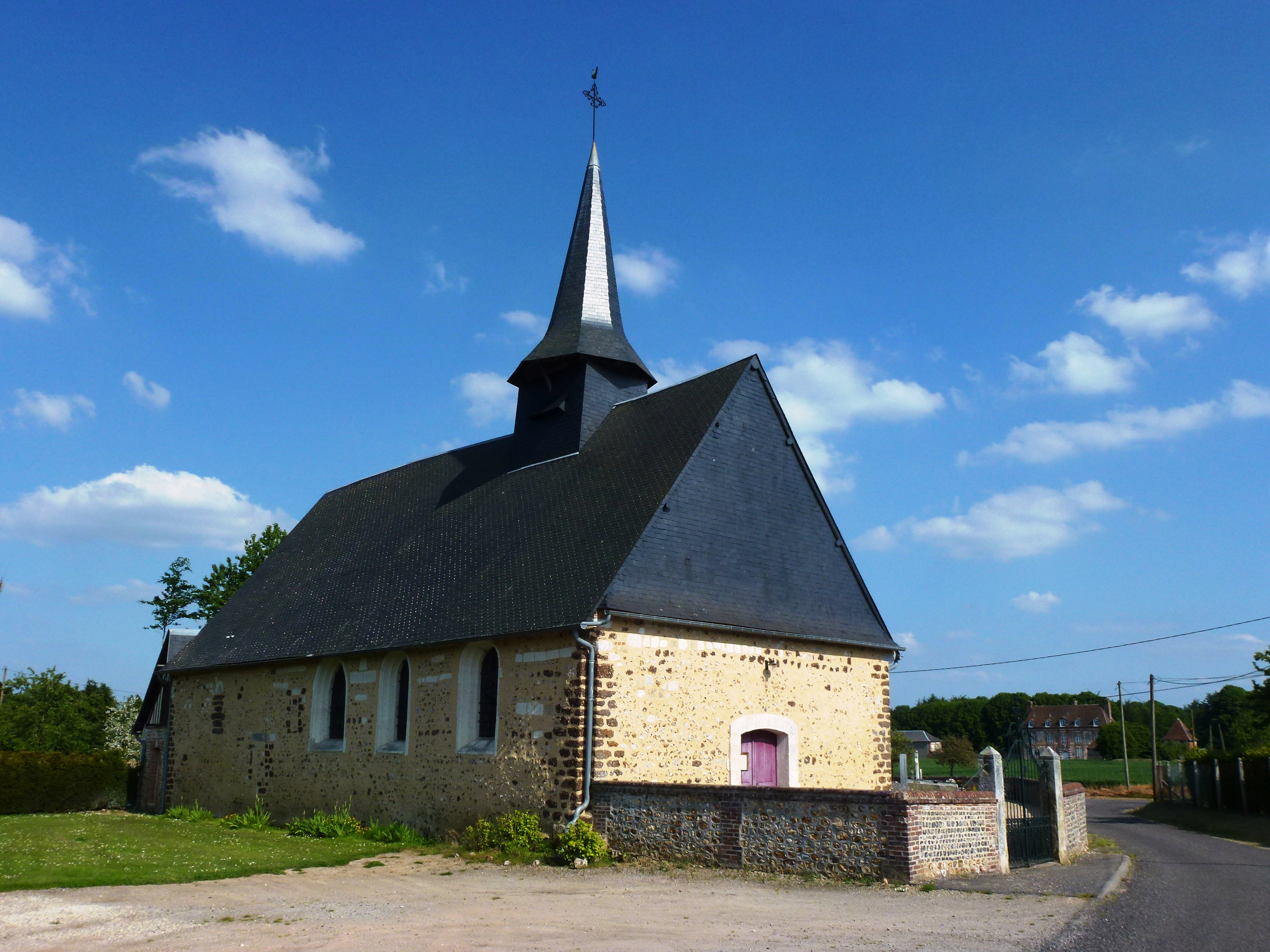
- The church in Caorches-Saint-Nicolas
- Location of Caorches-Saint-Nicolas
- Location within France Location within Normandy
- Coordinates: 49°05′03″N 0°33′09″E
- Country: France
- Region: Normandy
- Department: Eure
- Arrondissement: Bernay
- Canton: Bernay
- Intercommunality: Intercom Bernay Terres de Normandie

Government
  - Mayor (2020–2026): Jim Wallart
- Area^{1}: 11.78 km^{2} (4.55 sq mi)
- Elevation: 150 m (490 ft)
- Highest elevation: 176 m (577 ft)
- Lowest elevation: 113 m (371 ft)
- Population (2023): 601
  - Density: 51.0/km^{2} (132/sq mi)
- Time zone: UTC+01:00 (CET)
  - Summer (DST): UTC+02:00 (CEST)
- INSEE/Postal code: 27129 /27300
- ^{1} French Land Register data, which excludes lakes, ponds, glaciers > 1 km^{2} (0.386 sq mi or 247 acres) and river estuaries.

Caorches-Saint-Nicolas (French pronunciation: [kaɔʁʃ sɛ̃ nikɔla]) is a commune in the Eure department in northern France.

== Geography ==
The commune along with another 69 communes shares part of a 4,747 hectare, Natura 2000 conservation area, called Risle, Guiel, Charentonne.

== Population ==
Historical population
Year	Pop.	±% p.a.
1968	331	—
1975	513	+6.46%
1982	534	+0.57%
1990	570	+0.82%
1999	564	−0.12%
2007	577	+0.29%
2012	583	+0.21%
2017	592	+0.31%
2023	601	+0.25%
Source: INSEE

== See also ==
- Communes of the Eure department
