= Treis-Sants-en-Ouche =

- Commune
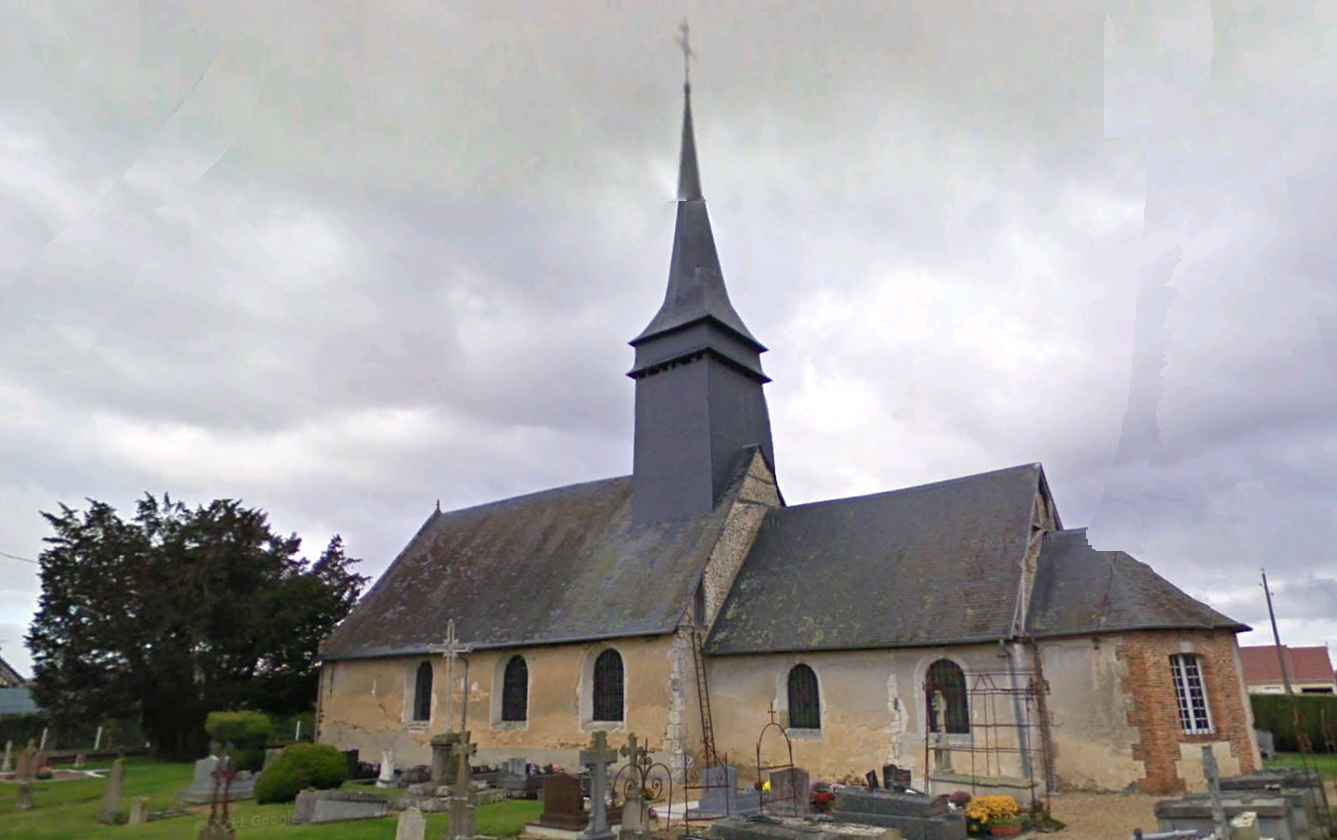
- The church in Saint-Clair-d'Arcey
- Location of Treis-Sants-en-Ouche
- Location within France Location within Normandy
- Coordinates: 49°03′05″N 0°36′25″E
- Country: France
- Region: Normandy
- Department: Eure
- Arrondissement: Bernay
- Canton: Bernay
- Intercommunality: Bernay Terres de Normandie
- Area^{1}: 30.73 km^{2} (11.86 sq mi)
- Highest elevation: 175 m (574 ft)
- Lowest elevation: 105 m (344 ft)
- Population (2023): 1,321
  - Density: 42.99/km^{2} (111.3/sq mi)
- Time zone: UTC+01:00 (CET)
  - Summer (DST): UTC+02:00 (CEST)
- INSEE/Postal code: 27516 /27300
- ^{1} French Land Register data, which excludes lakes, ponds, glaciers > 1 km^{2} (0.386 sq mi or 247 acres) and river estuaries.

Treis-Sants-en-Ouche is a commune in the Eure department in Normandy in northern France. It was established on 1 January 2019 by merger of the former communes of Saint-Aubin-le-Vertueux (the seat), Saint-Clair-d'Arcey and Saint-Quentin-des-Isles.

== Geography ==
The commune along with another 69 communes shares part of a 4,747 hectare, Natura 2000 conservation area, called Risle, Guiel, Charentonne.

== See also ==
- Communes of the Eure department
