= Pierre-Victorien Lottin =

French painter and archaeologist

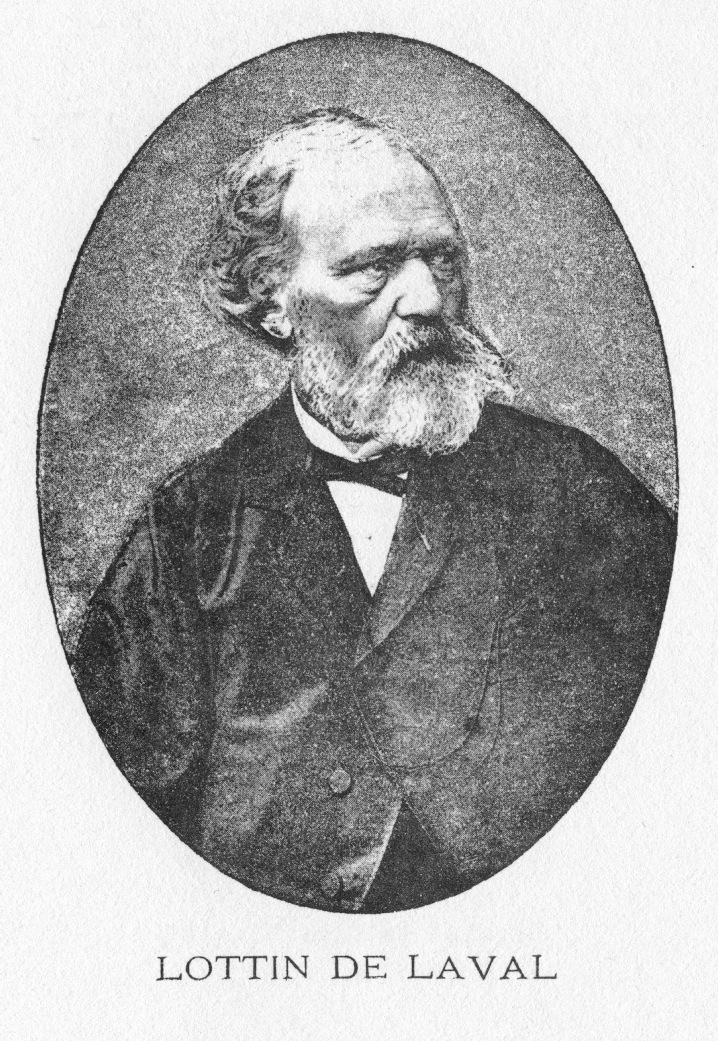
- Lottin de Laval in 1890
- Born: 19 September 1810; Orbec, France
- Died: February 23, 1903 (aged 92); Menneval, France
- Known for: Painting, archaeology

Pierre-Victorien Lottin, known as Victor Lottin de Laval (1810-1903) was a French archaeologist and Orientalist painter.

== Biography ==
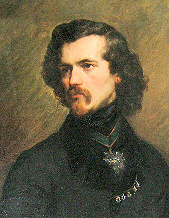
Portrait of Lottin by Auguste Charpentier (1840)

He was born into the modest family of a small-town hatter. His mother died when he was only seven so, by 1820, he was compelled to go live with an uncle in Paris, to relieve some of the financial burden on his father, and try to support himself. While there, he developed a passion for reading and was largely self-taught.

Later, with a recommendation from then Minister of Education François Guizot, he was able to obtain a position as secretary to the Comte d'Avesnes. During his time there, he began to write poetry and plays and often served as the Count's representative at the Hôtel de ville. There, he came into contact with many of that era's artistic personalities; including Victor Hugo, Eugène Delacroix, Alexandre Dumas, Hector Berlioz and George Sand.

After 1833, he began using the pseudonym "Lottin de Laval", after his mother's maiden name (Delaval). In 1834, he travelled to Italy, Sicily, Dalmatia and Illyria; developing an interest in archaeology. His experiences there inspired him to create a new method of molding, which he would later develop into a process that came to be called Lottinoplastie. His patent for it was purchased by the government.

He was most attracted to the civilizations of the Middle East and, from 1843 to 1846, was able to participate in a scientific mission, led by the French Consul, Paul-Émile Botta, that performed some of the first excavations at Nineveh. From 1850 to 1851, he was a member of another mission to the Arabian Peninsula. Using his molding methods, he was able to bring back 200 kilos (app.441 lbs.) of pieces that were bought by the government and stored at the Louvre. Due to what he felt was an underestimation of the pieces' value, both in scientific and monetary terms, he had a falling out with the authorities and was never chosen to go on any further missions.

In 1852, he retired from Paris to Menneval, in Eure, where he devoted himself to painting, based on sketches he had brought back from his trips, and studying Norman history. He was also involved in creating the Musée des beaux-arts de Bernay.

== Selected paintings ==
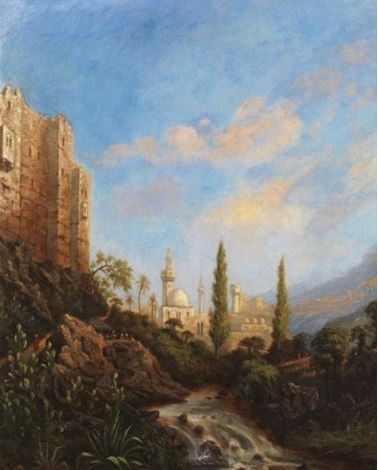
View of Tripoli, Lebanon

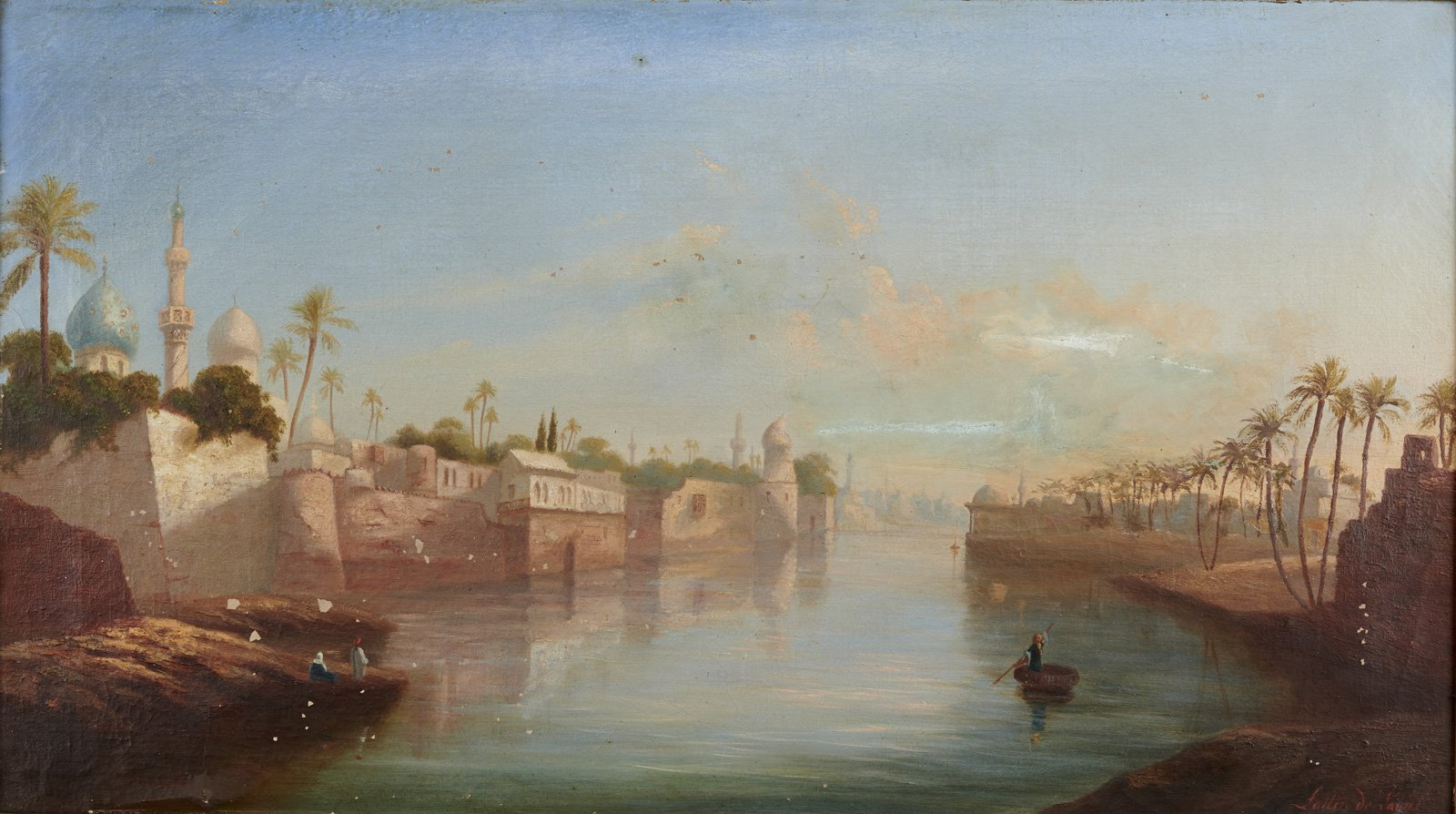
Baghdad

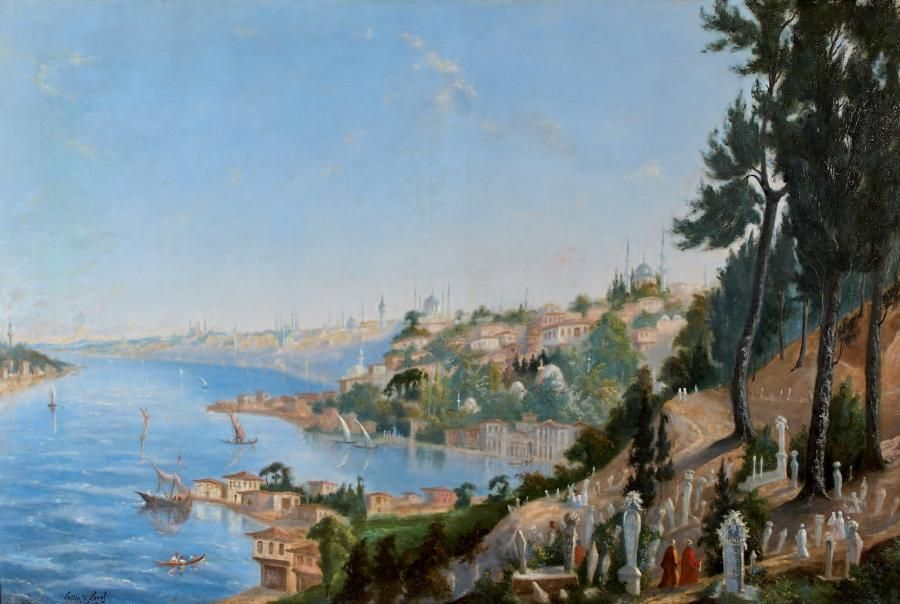
View of the Bosporus

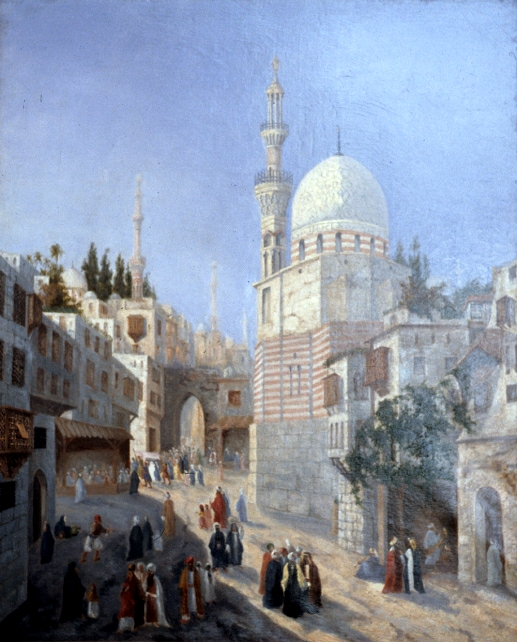
Street in Cairo
