= Valailles =

- Commune
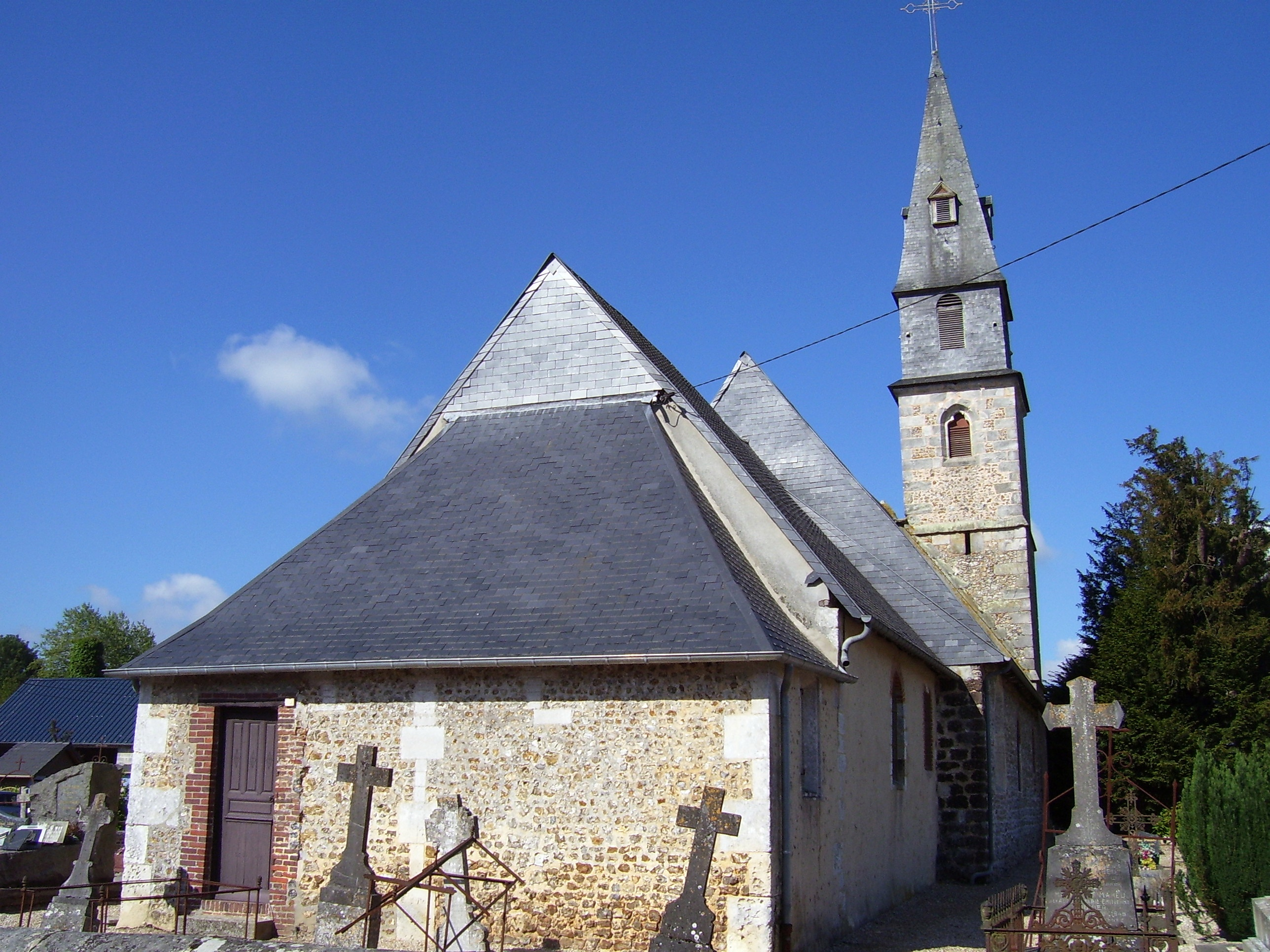
- Saint-Pierre

- Coat of arms
- Location of Valailles
- Location within France Location within Normandy
- Coordinates: 49°07′20″N 0°36′08″E
- Country: France
- Region: Normandy
- Department: Eure
- Arrondissement: Bernay
- Canton: Bernay

Government
  - Mayor (2020–2026): Claudine Dodelande
- Area^{1}: 5.37 km^{2} (2.07 sq mi)
- Elevation: 162 m (531 ft)
- Highest elevation: 164 m (538 ft)
- Lowest elevation: 119 m (390 ft)
- Population (2023): 413
  - Density: 76.9/km^{2} (199/sq mi)
- Time zone: UTC+01:00 (CET)
  - Summer (DST): UTC+02:00 (CEST)
- INSEE/Postal code: 27667 /27300
- ^{1} French Land Register data, which excludes lakes, ponds, glaciers > 1 km^{2} (0.386 sq mi or 247 acres) and river estuaries.

Valailles (French pronunciation: [valaj]) is a commune in the Eure department in Normandy in northern France.

== Population ==
Historical population
Year	Pop.	±% p.a.
1968	163	—
1975	180	+1.43%
1982	273	+6.13%
1990	303	+1.31%
1999	321	+0.64%
2007	370	+1.79%
2012	394	+1.26%
2017	384	−0.51%
2023	413	+1.22%
Source: INSEE

== See also ==
- Communes of the Eure department
