= Saint-Quentin-des-Isles =

- Part of Treis-Sants-en-Ouche
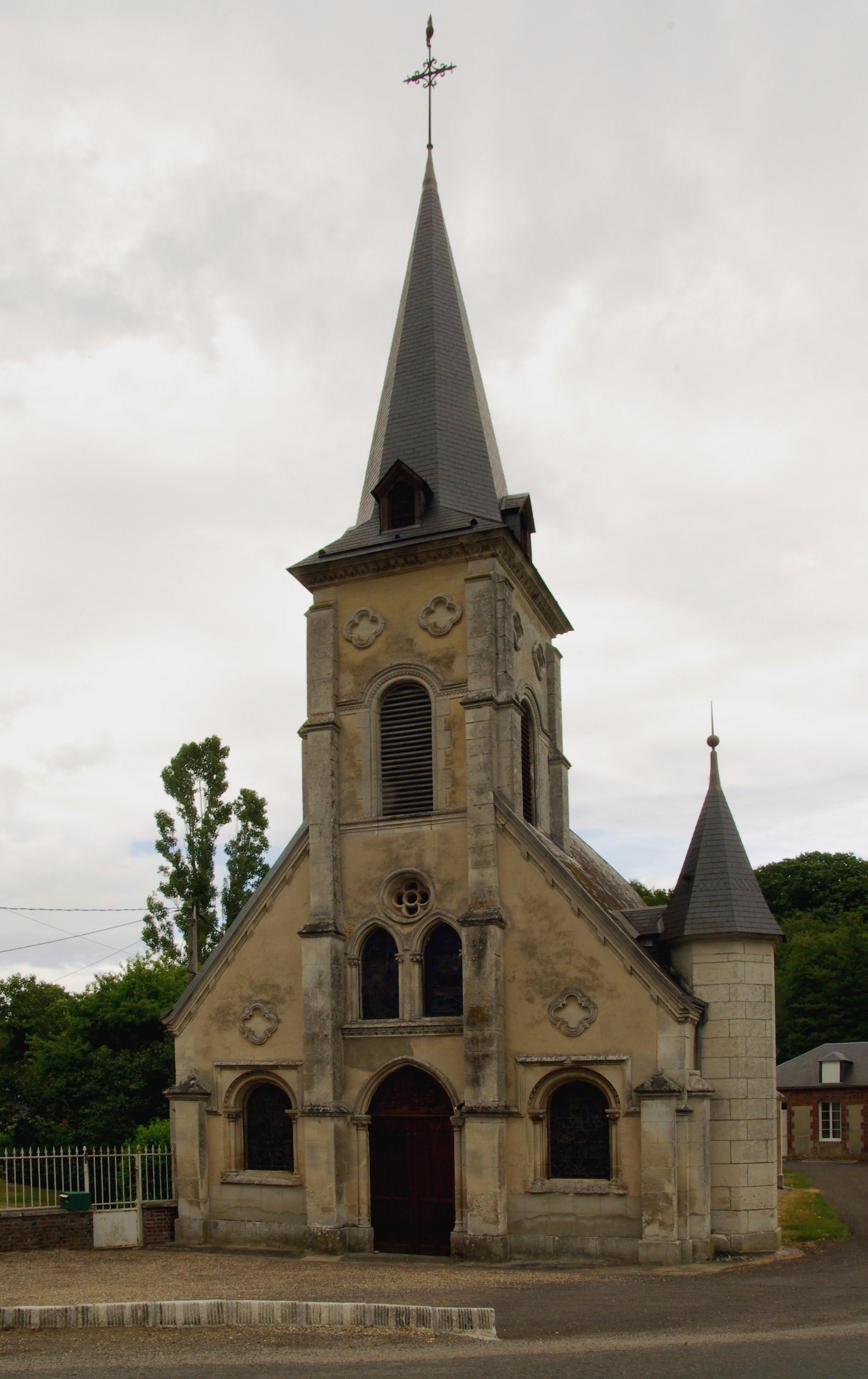
- Location of Saint-Quentin-des-Isles
- Location within France Location within Normandy
- Coordinates: 49°03′01″N 0°34′47″E
- Country: France
- Region: Normandy
- Department: Eure
- Arrondissement: Bernay
- Canton: Breteuil
- Commune: Treis-Sants-en-Ouche
- Area^{1}: 4 km^{2} (1.5 sq mi)
- Elevation: 132 m (433 ft)
- Highest elevation: 172 m (564 ft)
- Lowest elevation: 111 m (364 ft)
- Population (2023): 209
  - Density: 52/km^{2} (140/sq mi)
- Time zone: UTC+01:00 (CET)
  - Summer (DST): UTC+02:00 (CEST)
- Postal code: 27270
- ^{1} French Land Register data, which excludes lakes, ponds, glaciers > 1 km^{2} (0.386 sq mi or 247 acres) and river estuaries.

Saint-Quentin-des-Isles (French pronunciation: [sɛ̃ kɑ̃tɛ̃ de.z‿il]) is a former commune in the Eure department in Normandy in northern France. On 1 January 2019, it was merged into the new commune Treis-Sants-en-Ouche.

== See also ==
- Communes of the Eure department
