= Malouy =

- Commune
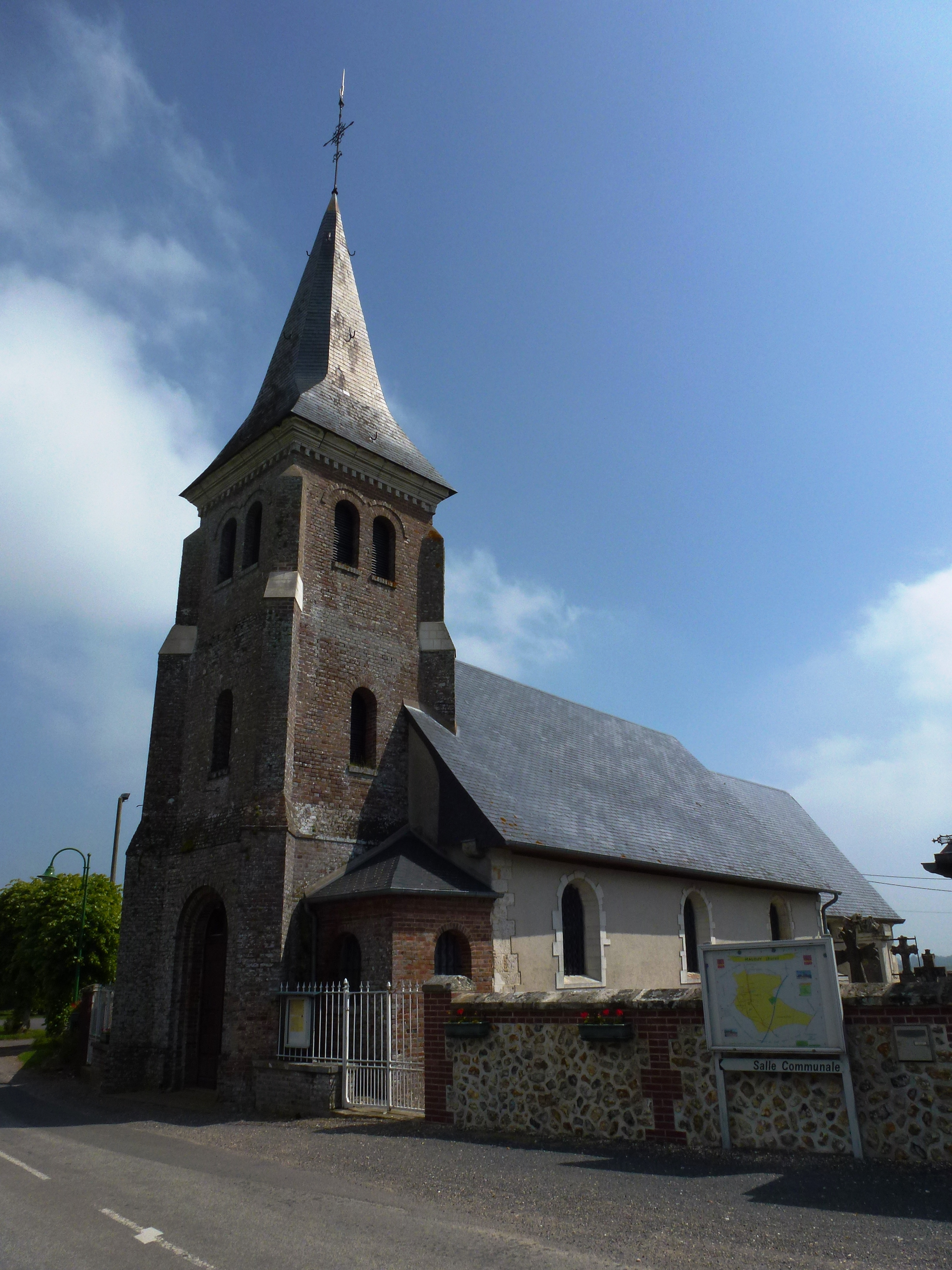
- The church in Malouy

- Coat of arms
- Location of Malouy
- Location within France Location within Normandy
- Coordinates: 49°07′47″N 0°31′19″E
- Country: France
- Region: Normandy
- Department: Eure
- Arrondissement: Bernay
- Canton: Bernay

Government
  - Mayor (2024–2026): Bertrand Launay
- Area^{1}: 3.14 km^{2} (1.21 sq mi)
- Elevation: 175 m (574 ft)
- Highest elevation: 175 m (574 ft)
- Lowest elevation: 166 m (545 ft)
- Population (2023): 174
  - Density: 55.4/km^{2} (144/sq mi)
- Time zone: UTC+01:00 (CET)
  - Summer (DST): UTC+02:00 (CEST)
- INSEE/Postal code: 27381 /27300
- ^{1} French Land Register data, which excludes lakes, ponds, glaciers > 1 km^{2} (0.386 sq mi or 247 acres) and river estuaries.

Malouy (French pronunciation: [malwi]) is a commune in the Eure department in Normandy in northern France.

== Population ==
Historical population
Year	Pop.	±% p.a.
1968	100	—
1975	95	−0.73%
1982	119	+3.27%
1990	125	+0.62%
1999	98	−2.67%
2007	113	+1.80%
2012	145	+5.11%
2017	160	+1.99%
2023	174	+1.41%
Source: INSEE

== See also ==
- Communes of the Eure department
