= Courbépine =

- Commune
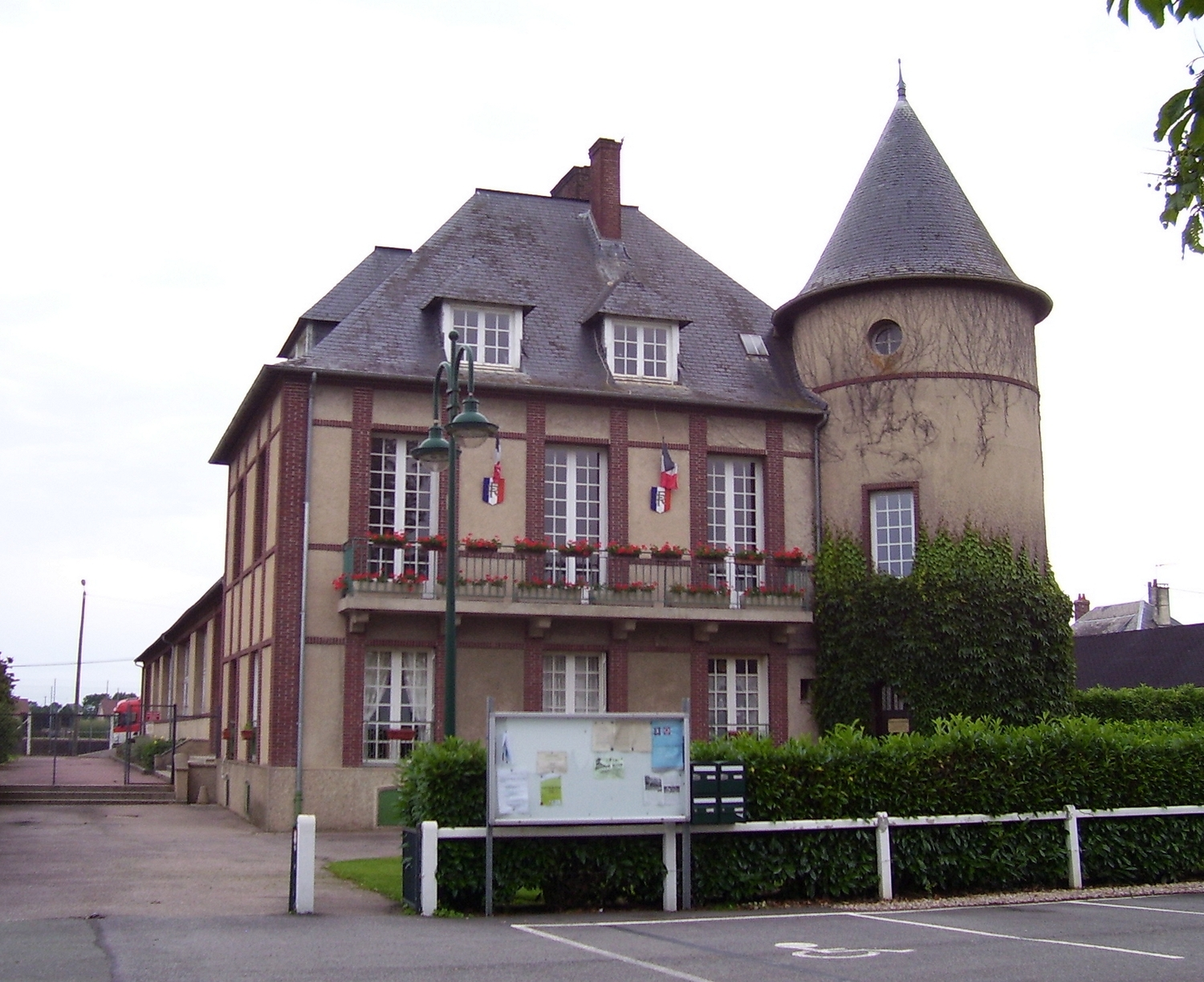
- Town hall

- Coat of arms
- Location of Courbépine
- Location within France Location within Normandy
- Coordinates: 49°07′40″N 0°33′43″E
- Country: France
- Region: Normandy
- Department: Eure
- Arrondissement: Bernay
- Canton: Bernay

Government
  - Mayor (2020–2026): Bruno Prive
- Area^{1}: 11.91 km^{2} (4.60 sq mi)
- Elevation: 168 m (551 ft)
- Highest elevation: 178 m (584 ft)
- Lowest elevation: 149 m (489 ft)
- Population (2023): 733
  - Density: 61.5/km^{2} (159/sq mi)
- Time zone: UTC+01:00 (CET)
  - Summer (DST): UTC+02:00 (CEST)
- INSEE/Postal code: 27179 /27300
- ^{1} French Land Register data, which excludes lakes, ponds, glaciers > 1 km^{2} (0.386 sq mi or 247 acres) and river estuaries.

Courbépine (French pronunciation: [kuʁbepin]) is a commune in the Eure department in northern France.

== Population ==
Historical population
Year	Pop.	±% p.a.
1968	446	—
1975	553	+3.12%
1982	576	+0.58%
1990	606	+0.64%
1999	619	+0.24%
2007	660	+0.80%
2012	723	+1.84%
2017	727	+0.11%
2023	733	+0.14%
Source: INSEE

== See also ==
- Communes of the Eure department
