= Le Noyer-en-Ouche =

- Commune
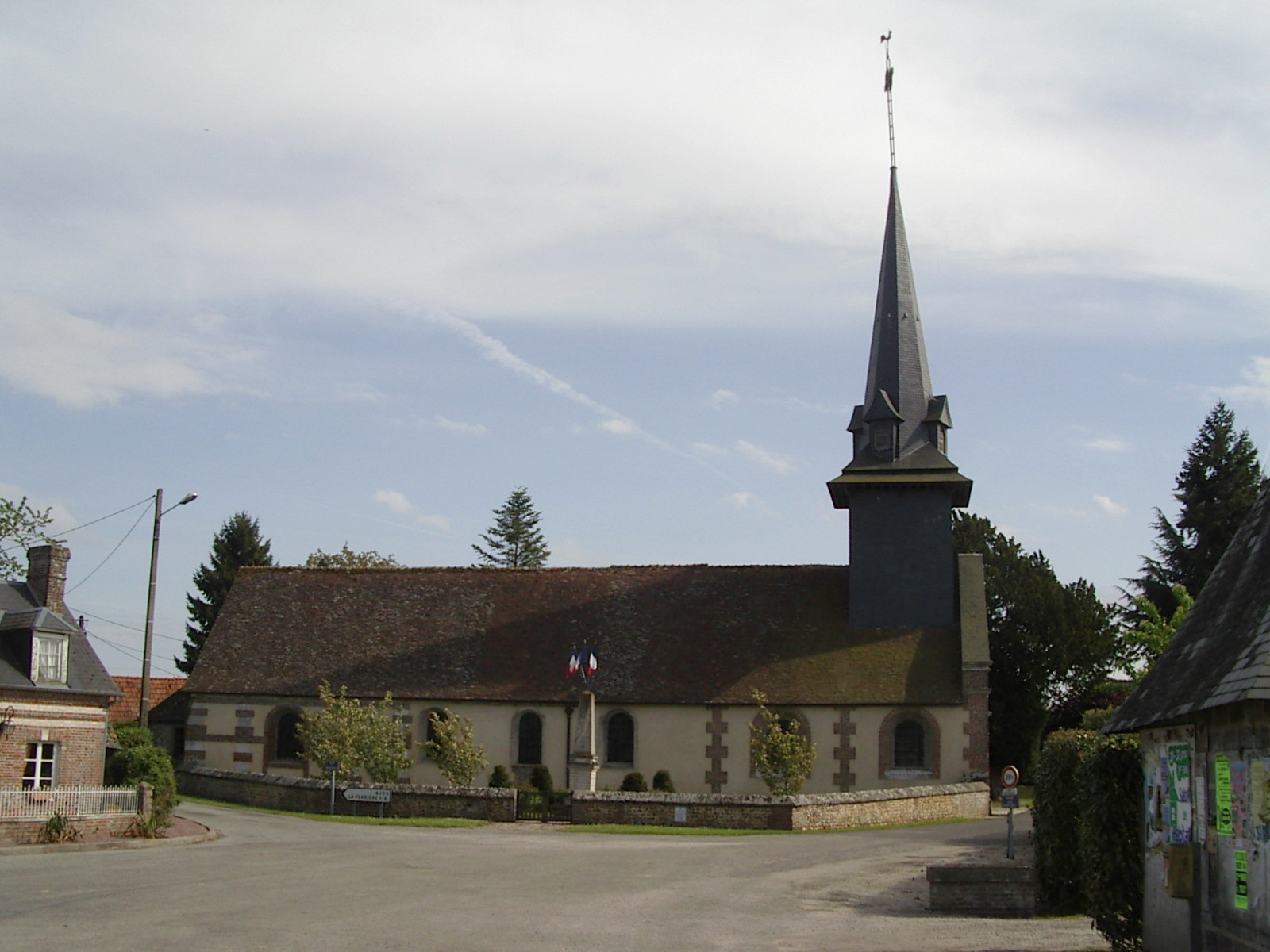
- The church in Le Noyer-en-Ouche
- Location of Le Noyer-en-Ouche
- Location within France Location within Normandy
- Coordinates: 49°00′21″N 0°46′24″E
- Country: France
- Region: Normandy
- Department: Eure
- Arrondissement: Bernay
- Canton: Bernay

Government
  - Mayor (2022–2026): Josette Musset
- Area^{1}: 10.9 km^{2} (4.2 sq mi)
- Elevation: 168 m (551 ft)
- Highest elevation: 183 m (600 ft)
- Lowest elevation: 110 m (360 ft)
- Population (2023): 193
  - Density: 17.7/km^{2} (45.9/sq mi)
- Time zone: UTC+01:00 (CET)
  - Summer (DST): UTC+02:00 (CEST)
- INSEE/Postal code: 27444 /27410
- ^{1} French Land Register data, which excludes lakes, ponds, glaciers > 1 km^{2} (0.386 sq mi or 247 acres) and river estuaries.

Le Noyer-en-Ouche (French pronunciation: [lə nwaje ɑ̃.n‿uʃ], literally Le Noyer in Ouche) is a commune in the Eure department in Normandy in north-western France.

== Geography ==
The commune along with another 69 communes shares part of a 4,747 hectare, Natura 2000 conservation area, called Risle, Guiel, Charentonne.

== Population ==
Between 1795 and 1800 Le Noyer-en-Ouche absorbed the former communes Chatel-la-Lune and Chatellier-Saint-Pierre.

Historical population

Year	Pop.	±% p.a.
1800	488	—
1861	546	+0.18%
1911	327	−1.02%
1962	286	−0.26%
1968	232	−3.43%
1975	234	+0.12%
1982	147	−6.43%

Year	Pop.	±% p.a.
1990	177	+2.35%
1999	200	+1.37%
2007	185	−0.97%
2012	217	+3.24%
2017	228	+0.99%
2023	193	−2.74%

Source: EHESS and INSEE

== See also ==
- Communes of the Eure department
