= Corneville-la-Fouquetière =

- Commune
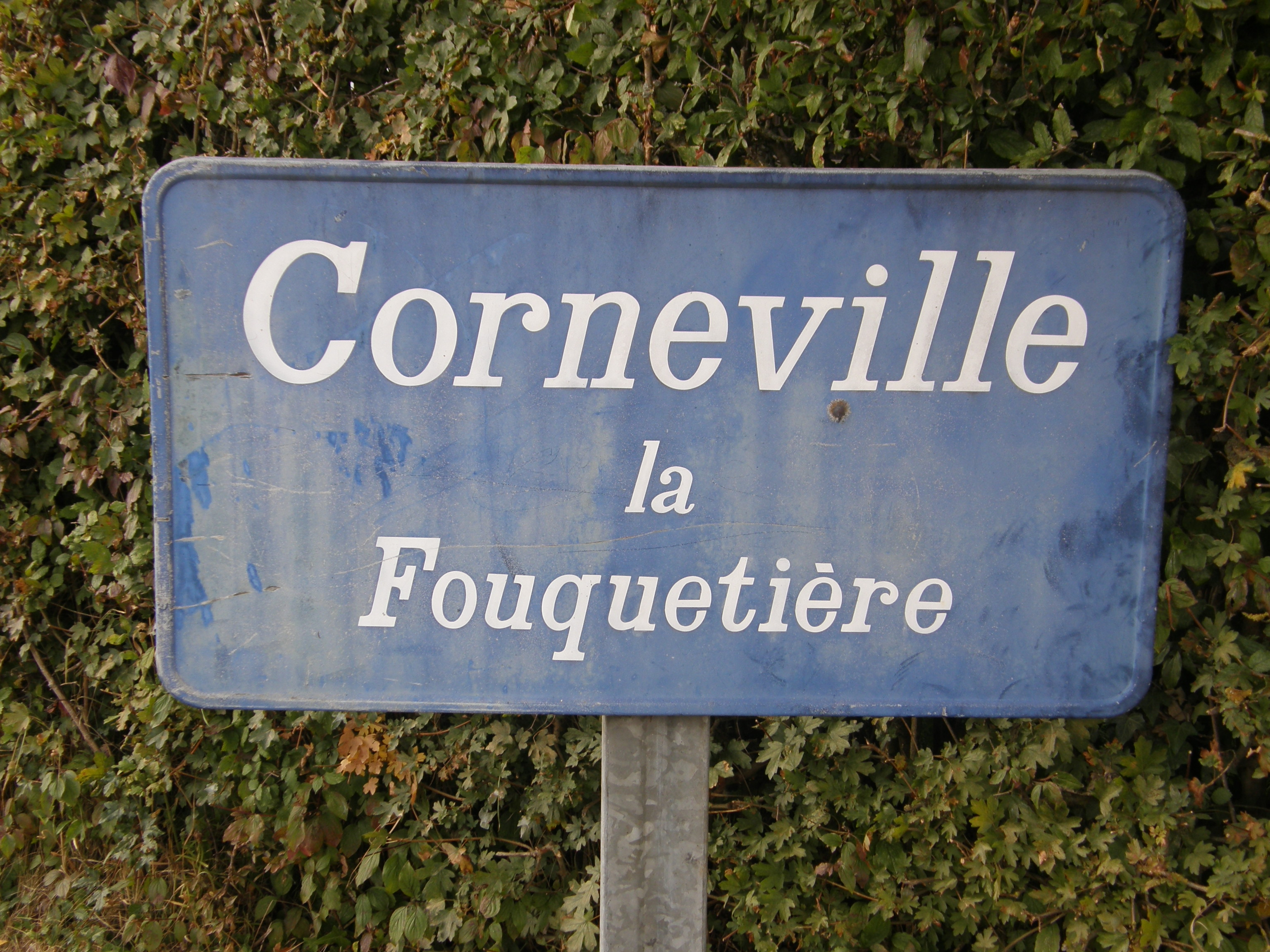
- An entry sign into Corneville-la-Fouquetière
- Location of Corneville-la-Fouquetière
- Location within France Location within Normandy
- Coordinates: 49°04′00″N 0°42′22″E
- Country: France
- Region: Normandy
- Department: Eure
- Arrondissement: Bernay
- Canton: Bernay

Government
  - Mayor (2020–2026): Joël Descamps
- Area^{1}: 3.99 km^{2} (1.54 sq mi)
- Elevation: 131 m (430 ft)
- Highest elevation: 163 m (535 ft)
- Lowest elevation: 114 m (374 ft)
- Population (2023): 121
  - Density: 30.3/km^{2} (78.5/sq mi)
- Time zone: UTC+01:00 (CET)
  - Summer (DST): UTC+02:00 (CEST)
- INSEE/Postal code: 27173 /27300
- ^{1} French Land Register data, which excludes lakes, ponds, glaciers > 1 km^{2} (0.386 sq mi or 247 acres) and river estuaries.

Corneville-la-Fouquetière (French pronunciation: [kɔʁnəvil la fuktjɛʁ]) is a commune in the Eure department in Normandy, northern France.

== Population ==
Historical population
Year	Pop.	±% p.a.
1968	71	—
1975	55	−3.58%
1982	62	+1.73%
1990	76	+2.58%
1999	83	+0.98%
2007	101	+2.48%
2012	113	+2.27%
2017	121	+1.38%
2023	121	+0.00%
Source: INSEE

== See also ==
- Communes of the Eure department
