= Fontaine-l'Abbé =

- Commune
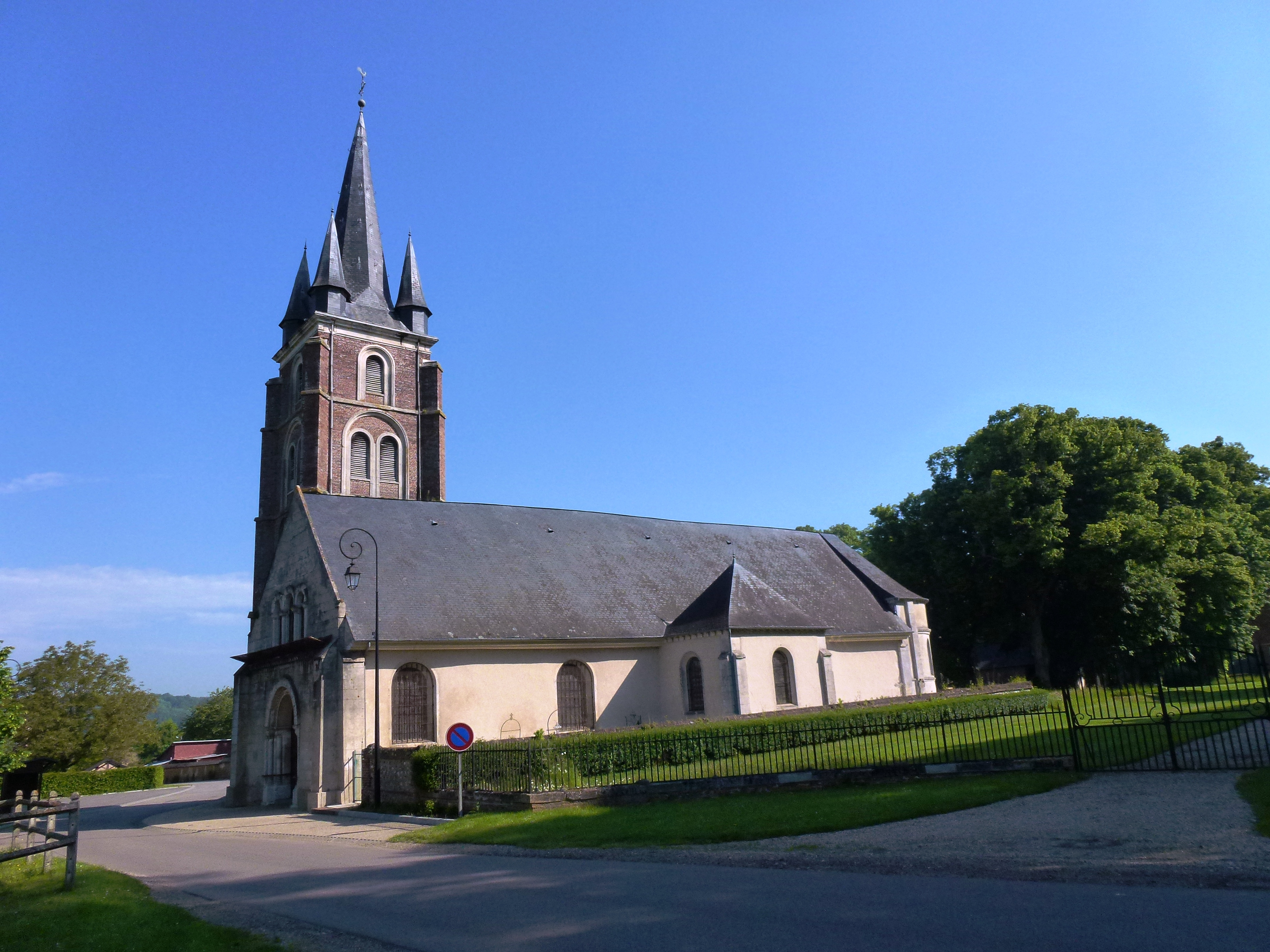
- The church in Fontaine-l'Abbé
- Location of Fontaine-l'Abbé
- Location within France Location within Normandy
- Coordinates: 49°05′31″N 0°41′38″E
- Country: France
- Region: Normandy
- Department: Eure
- Arrondissement: Bernay
- Canton: Bernay

Government
  - Mayor (2020–2026): André Van Den Driessche
- Area^{1}: 13.23 km^{2} (5.11 sq mi)
- Elevation: 85 m (279 ft)
- Highest elevation: 159 m (522 ft)
- Lowest elevation: 76 m (249 ft)
- Population (2023): 551
  - Density: 41.6/km^{2} (108/sq mi)
- Time zone: UTC+01:00 (CET)
  - Summer (DST): UTC+02:00 (CEST)
- INSEE/Postal code: 27251 /27470
- ^{1} French Land Register data, which excludes lakes, ponds, glaciers > 1 km^{2} (0.386 sq mi or 247 acres) and river estuaries.

Fontaine-l'Abbé (French pronunciation: [fɔ̃tɛn labe]) is a commune in the Eure department in the Normandy region in northern France.

== Geography ==
The commune along with another 69 communes shares part of a 4,747 hectare, Natura 2000 conservation area, called Risle, Guiel, Charentonne.

== Population ==
Historical population
Year	Pop.	±% p.a.
1968	476	—
1975	532	+1.60%
1982	510	−0.60%
1990	564	+1.27%
1999	549	−0.30%
2007	574	+0.56%
2012	580	+0.21%
2017	527	−1.90%
2023	551	+0.74%
Source: INSEE

== See also ==
- Communes of the Eure department
