= Saint-Victor-de-Chrétienville =

- Commune
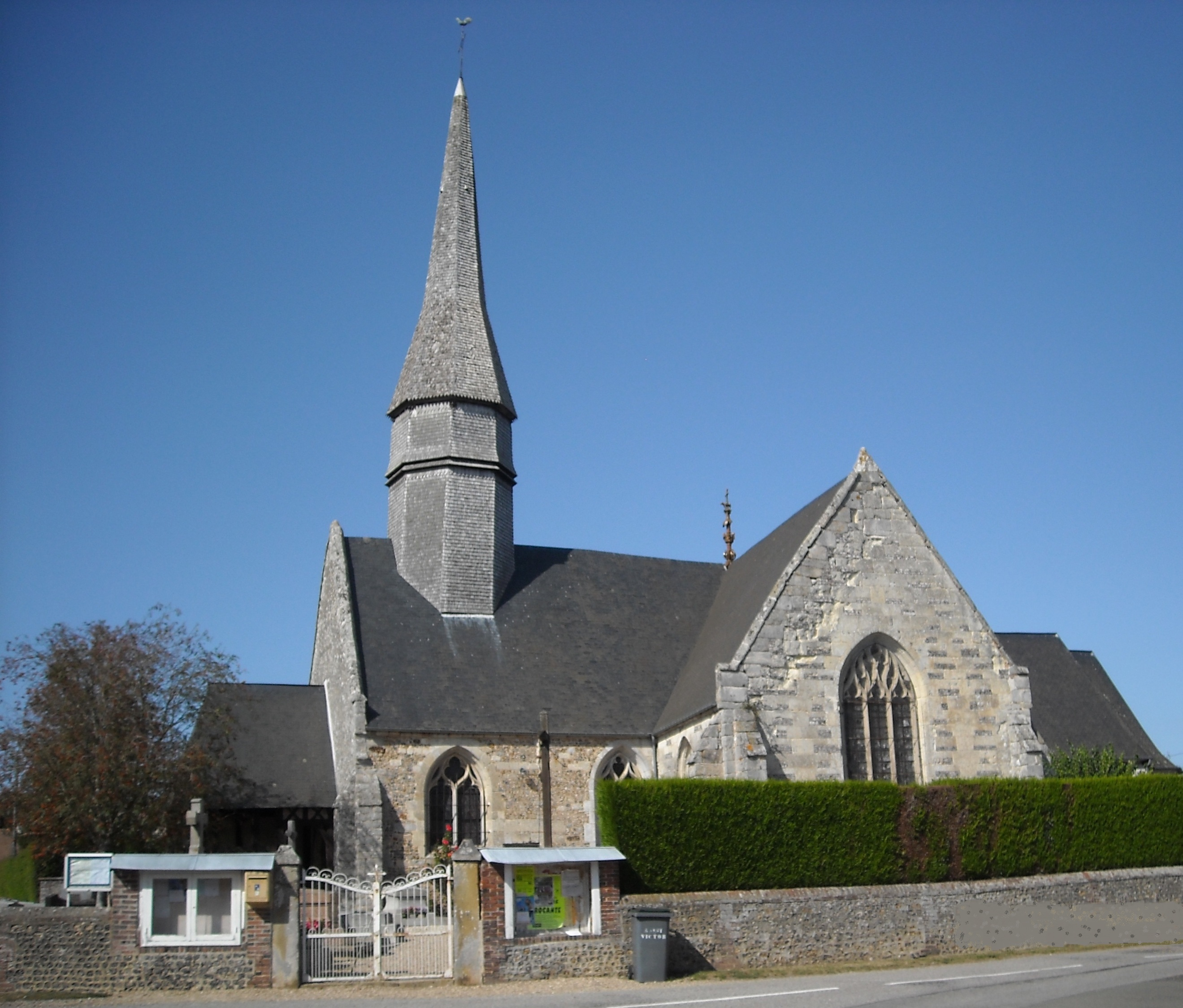
- The church in Saint-Victor-de-Chrétienville
- Location of Saint-Victor-de-Chrétienville
- Location within France Location within Normandy
- Coordinates: 49°04′28″N 0°31′04″E
- Country: France
- Region: Normandy
- Department: Eure
- Arrondissement: Bernay
- Canton: Bernay

Government
  - Mayor (2020–2026): Georges Mézière
- Area^{1}: 5.81 km^{2} (2.24 sq mi)
- Elevation: 161 m (528 ft)
- Highest elevation: 187 m (614 ft)
- Lowest elevation: 160 m (520 ft)
- Population (2023): 449
  - Density: 77.3/km^{2} (200/sq mi)
- Time zone: UTC+01:00 (CET)
  - Summer (DST): UTC+02:00 (CEST)
- INSEE/Postal code: 27608 /27300
- ^{1} French Land Register data, which excludes lakes, ponds, glaciers > 1 km^{2} (0.386 sq mi or 247 acres) and river estuaries.

Saint-Victor-de-Chrétienville (French pronunciation: [sɛ̃ viktɔʁ də kʁetjɛ̃vil]) is a commune in the Eure department in Normandy in northern France.

== Population ==
Historical population
Year	Pop.	±% p.a.
1968	189	—
1975	220	+2.19%
1982	300	+4.53%
1990	346	+1.80%
1999	376	+0.93%
2007	426	+1.57%
2012	456	+1.37%
2017	456	+0.00%
2023	449	−0.26%
Source: INSEE

== See also ==
- Communes of the Eure department
