= Saint-Léger-de-Rôtes =

Saint-Léger-de-Rôstes
- Commune
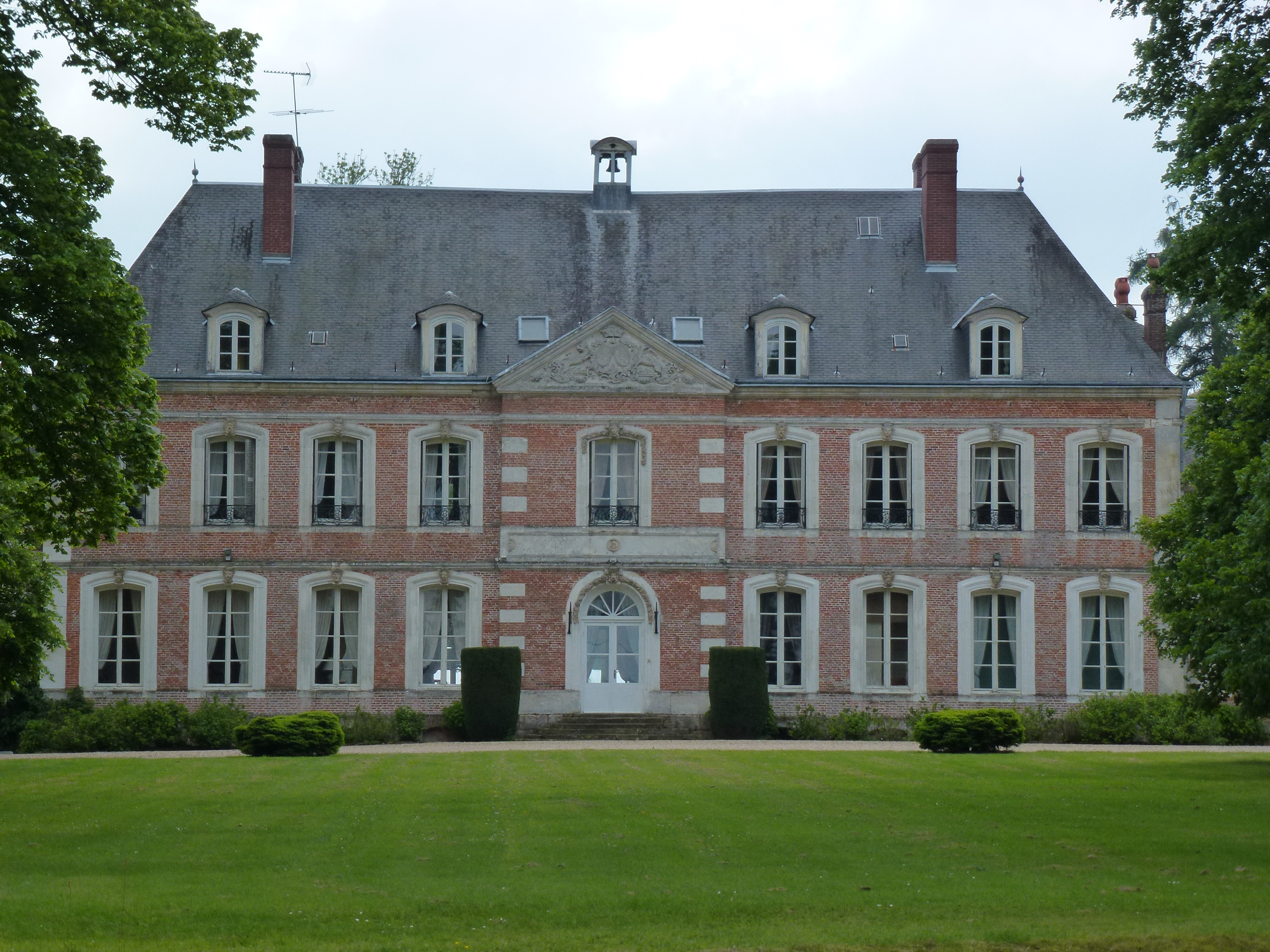
- Chateau
- Location of Saint-Léger-de-Rôstes
- Location within France Location within Normandy
- Coordinates: 49°06′38″N 0°38′56″E
- Country: France
- Region: Normandy
- Department: Eure
- Arrondissement: Bernay
- Canton: Bernay

Government
  - Mayor (2020–2026): Olivier Piquenot
- Area^{1}: 6.46 km^{2} (2.49 sq mi)
- Elevation: 152 m (499 ft)
- Highest elevation: 154 m (505 ft)
- Lowest elevation: 104 m (341 ft)
- Population (2023): 441
  - Density: 68.3/km^{2} (177/sq mi)
- Time zone: UTC+01:00 (CET)
  - Summer (DST): UTC+02:00 (CEST)
- INSEE/Postal code: 27557 /27300
- ^{1} French Land Register data, which excludes lakes, ponds, glaciers > 1 km^{2} (0.386 sq mi or 247 acres) and river estuaries.

Saint-Léger-de-Rôtes (French pronunciation: [sɛ̃ leʒe də ʁot]) is a commune in the Eure department in Normandy in northern France.

== Population ==
Historical population
Year	Pop.	±% p.a.
1968	354	—
1975	405	+1.94%
1982	444	+1.32%
1990	465	+0.58%
1999	426	−0.97%
2007	421	−0.15%
2012	405	−0.77%
2017	436	+1.49%
2023	441	+0.19%
Source: INSEE

== See also ==
- Communes of the Eure department
