= Plasnes =

- Commune
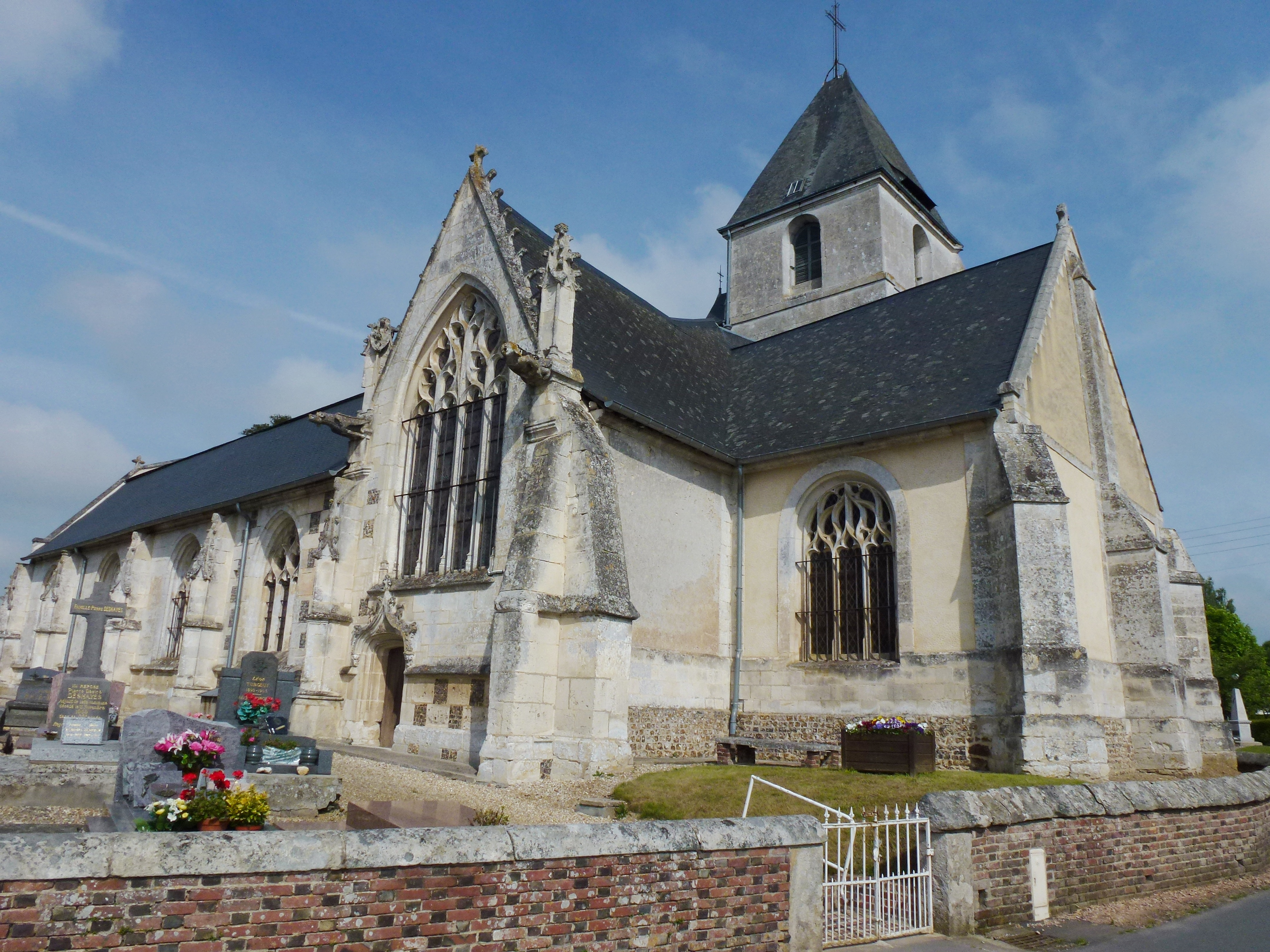
- The church in Plasnes

- Coat of arms
- Location of Plasnes
- Location within France Location within Normandy
- Coordinates: 49°08′14″N 0°37′30″E
- Country: France
- Region: Normandy
- Department: Eure
- Arrondissement: Bernay
- Canton: Bernay

Government
  - Mayor (2022–2026): Guillaume Boulaye
- Area^{1}: 16.06 km^{2} (6.20 sq mi)
- Elevation: 160 m (520 ft)
- Highest elevation: 178 m (584 ft)
- Lowest elevation: 113 m (371 ft)
- Population (2023): 729
  - Density: 45.4/km^{2} (118/sq mi)
- Time zone: UTC+01:00 (CET)
  - Summer (DST): UTC+02:00 (CEST)
- INSEE/Postal code: 27463 /27300
- ^{1} French Land Register data, which excludes lakes, ponds, glaciers > 1 km^{2} (0.386 sq mi or 247 acres) and river estuaries.

Plasnes (French pronunciation: [plan]) is a commune in the Eure department in Normandy in northern France.

== Population ==
Historical population
Year	Pop.	±% p.a.
1968	402	—
1975	479	+2.54%
1982	536	+1.62%
1990	577	+0.93%
1999	618	+0.77%
2007	610	−0.16%
2012	691	+2.52%
2017	713	+0.63%
2023	729	+0.37%
Source: INSEE

== See also ==
- Communes of the Eure department
