= Marie Delaporte =

French actress

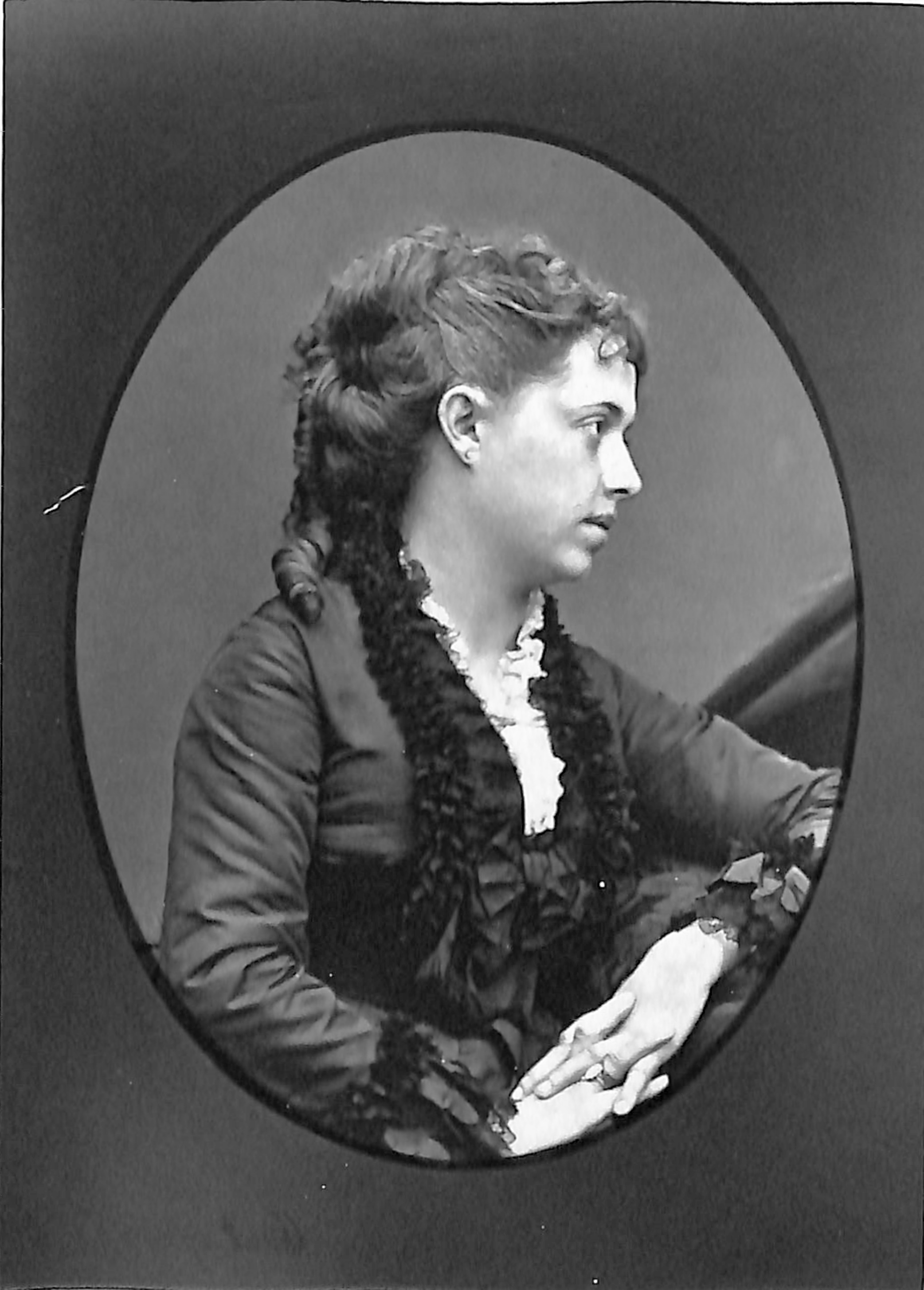
- Marie Delaporte dite Minette, 2 January 1870
- Born: 27 September 1838; Paris, France
- Died: 1910
- Occupation: Actress

Marie Delaporte (27 September 1838 – 1910) was a French actress who played for many years in Paris and Saint Petersburg. She was known for her modesty, grace and decency.

== Life ==
Marie Delaporte was born in Paris on 27 September 1838. Her parents were shopkeepers. She entered the Conservatoire de Paris in 1853. She studied under Joseph Isidore Samson and obtained the first place in 1854. She made her debut at the Théâtre du Gymnase in Paris on 6 May 1855 with the Mariage de Victorine, as Victorine. She was intelligent, cheerful and sentimental, and performed for 13 years at this theatre, with a piquant naivety, grace and decency. Her last role at the Gymnase was in the Roman d'une honnête Femme which opened on 16 November 1867. She played in works by George Sand, Eugène Scribe, Alexandre Dumas fils, Octave Feuillet, Victorien Sardou and Théodore Barrière throughout the Second French Empire. In 1867 she co-starred with Madame Pasca (Alix-Marie-Angèle Séon) in the play Les Idées de Madame Aubray by Dumas fils.

In 1867 the Comédie-Française offered Marie Delaporte the position of sociétaire. She declined that but accepted the position of pensionnaire (paid actor). She fell ill and had to stay away from the stage for a year. She then received a magnificent offer from Russia of 55,000 francs per year with five months off. The director of the Gymnase released her from her contract. In Saint Petersburg Delaporte found her compatriots Dupais and Dieudonné. Marie Delaporte spent seven years at the Mikhailovsky Theatre in Saint Petersburg during that theatre's apogee. She was accepted by the society of that city, and by literary men such as Count Vladimir Sollogub. There is a story that at one time Madame Pasca was to play Mathilde in the Supplice d'une femme, but she was sick and unable to appear. Delaporte played the part in her place. She learned the part in three days, and performed it wonderfully.

Marie Delaporte did not return to the Gymnase until 22 September 1874, when she created the role of Gilberle. After another year in Russia she returned to star at the boulevard Bonne-Nouvelle on 25 August 1875 in a reprise of Froufrou, a role that was originally created for Mme Desclée. In June 1876 Marie Delaporte was in London with M. Andrieu, and appeared in private performances of L'Autre Motif by Édouard Pailleron and various pieces suitable for one or two performers. Her last appearances seem to have been at the Vaudeville from 23–30 December 1877 in Une Séparation and on 1 March 1878 in the Bourgeois de Pont-Arcy. She later taught diction at the École Normale Supérieure. She lived in Paris from 1884 to 1904. In 1884 she was named an Officer of the Academy, and in 1899, at the age of 60, she was given a pension of 500 francs by the Société des artistes.

== Sources ==
- Gauchez, L. (1884), "Notre Bibliotheque XCIV", in Eugène Véron and Paul Leroi (ed.), Courrier de l'art, Librairie de l'art
- James, Henry (2016-01-26), Henry James: Autobiographies: A Small Boy and Others / Notes of a Son and Brother / The Middle Years / Other Writings: Library of America #274, Library of America, ISBN 978-1-59853-472-6
- Lyonnet, Henry (1912), Dictionnaire des comédiens français, ceux d'hier : biographie, bibliographie, iconographie (in French), Genève: Bibliothèque de la Revue universelle internationale illustrée
- Marie Delaporte (1838-18..) (in French), BnF: Bibliotheque nationale de France
- The Athenaeum, British Periodicals Limited, 1876
