= Plainville, Eure =

Plainville
- Commune
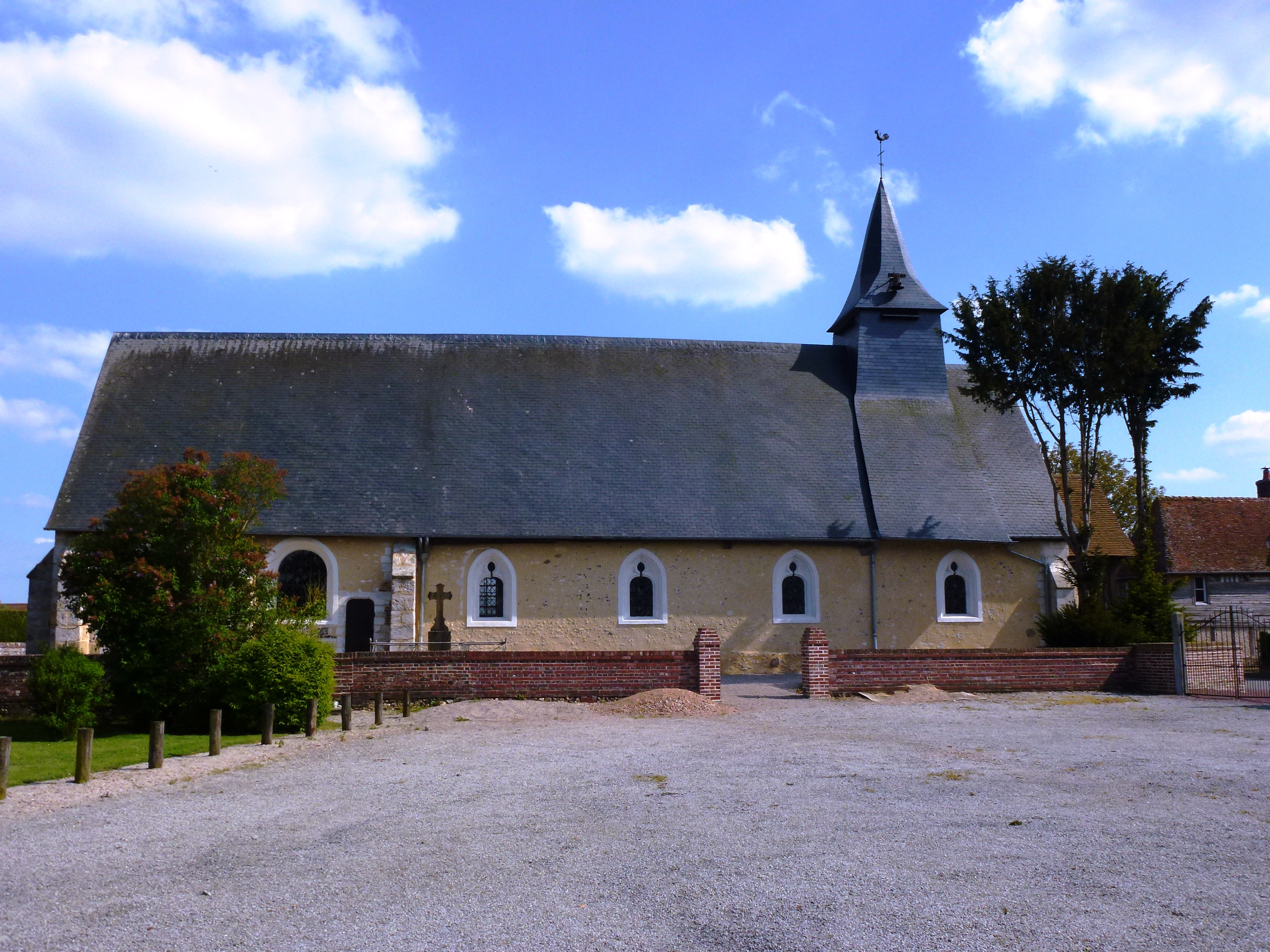
- The church in Plainville
- Location of Plainville
- Location within France Location within Normandy
- Coordinates: 49°05′08″N 0°30′00″E
- Country: France
- Region: Normandy
- Department: Eure
- Arrondissement: Bernay
- Canton: Bernay

Government
  - Mayor (2020–2026): Jean-Louis Vila
- Area^{1}: 6.41 km^{2} (2.47 sq mi)
- Elevation: 182 m (597 ft)
- Highest elevation: 185 m (607 ft)
- Lowest elevation: 150 m (490 ft)
- Population (2023): 204
  - Density: 31.8/km^{2} (82.4/sq mi)
- Time zone: UTC+01:00 (CET)
  - Summer (DST): UTC+02:00 (CEST)
- INSEE/Postal code: 27460 /27300
- ^{1} French Land Register data, which excludes lakes, ponds, glaciers > 1 km^{2} (0.386 sq mi or 247 acres) and river estuaries.

Plainville (French pronunciation: [plɛ̃vil]) is a commune in the Eure department in Normandy in northern France.

== Population ==
Historical population
Year	Pop.	±% p.a.
1968	146	—
1975	129	−1.75%
1982	166	+3.67%
1990	171	+0.37%
1999	205	+2.04%
2007	188	−1.08%
2012	189	+0.11%
2017	195	+0.63%
2023	204	+0.75%
Source: INSEE

== See also ==
- Communes of the Eure department
