= Menneval =

- Commune
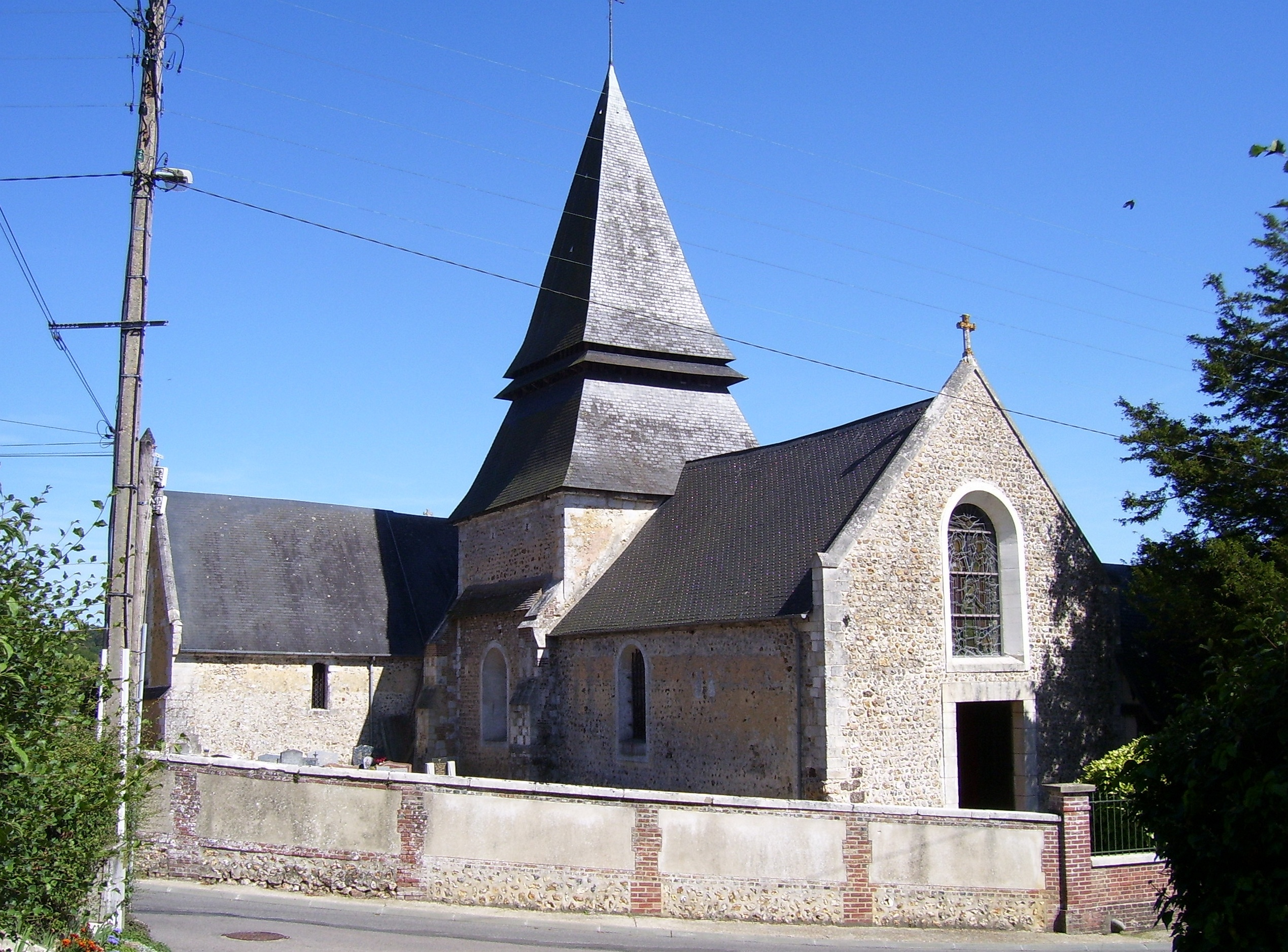
- The church in Menneval

- Coat of arms
- Location of Menneval
- Location within France Location within Normandy
- Coordinates: 49°05′53″N 0°37′29″E
- Country: France
- Region: Normandy
- Department: Eure
- Arrondissement: Bernay
- Canton: Bernay

Government
  - Mayor (2020–2026): Françoise Canu
- Area^{1}: 6.63 km^{2} (2.56 sq mi)
- Elevation: 150 m (490 ft)
- Highest elevation: 164 m (538 ft)
- Lowest elevation: 90 m (300 ft)
- Population (2023): 1,527
  - Density: 230/km^{2} (597/sq mi)
- Time zone: UTC+01:00 (CET)
  - Summer (DST): UTC+02:00 (CEST)
- INSEE/Postal code: 27398 /27300
- ^{1} French Land Register data, which excludes lakes, ponds, glaciers > 1 km^{2} (0.386 sq mi or 247 acres) and river estuaries.

Menneval (French pronunciation: [mɛnval]) is a commune in the Eure department in Normandy in northern France.

== Geography ==
The commune along with another 69 communes shares part of a 4,747 hectare, Natura 2000 conservation area, called Risle, Guiel, Charentonne.

== Population ==
Historical population
Year	Pop.	±% p.a.
1968	1,073	—
1975	1,135	+0.81%
1982	1,325	+2.24%
1990	1,338	+0.12%
1999	1,322	−0.13%
2007	1,423	+0.92%
2012	1,414	−0.13%
2017	1,430	+0.23%
2023	1,527	+1.10%
Source: INSEE

== See also ==
- Communes of the Eure department
