= Canton of Bernay =

Canton in Normandy, France

Coordinates: 49.09°N 0.60°E

The canton of Bernay is an administrative division of the Eure department, northern France. It was created at the French canton reorganisation which came into effect in March 2015. Its seat is in Bernay.

It consists of the following communes:

1. Bernay
2. Caorches-Saint-Nicolas
3. Corneville-la-Fouquetière
4. Courbépine
5. Fontaine-l'Abbé
6. Malouy
7. Menneval
8. Mesnil-en-Ouche
9. Le Noyer-en-Ouche
10. Plainville
11. Plasnes
12. Saint-Léger-de-Rôtes
13. Saint-Martin-du-Tilleul
14. Saint-Victor-de-Chrétienville
15. Serquigny
16. Treis-Sants-en-Ouche
17. Valailles
