= Peter de Montfort =

English magnate, soldier and diplomat

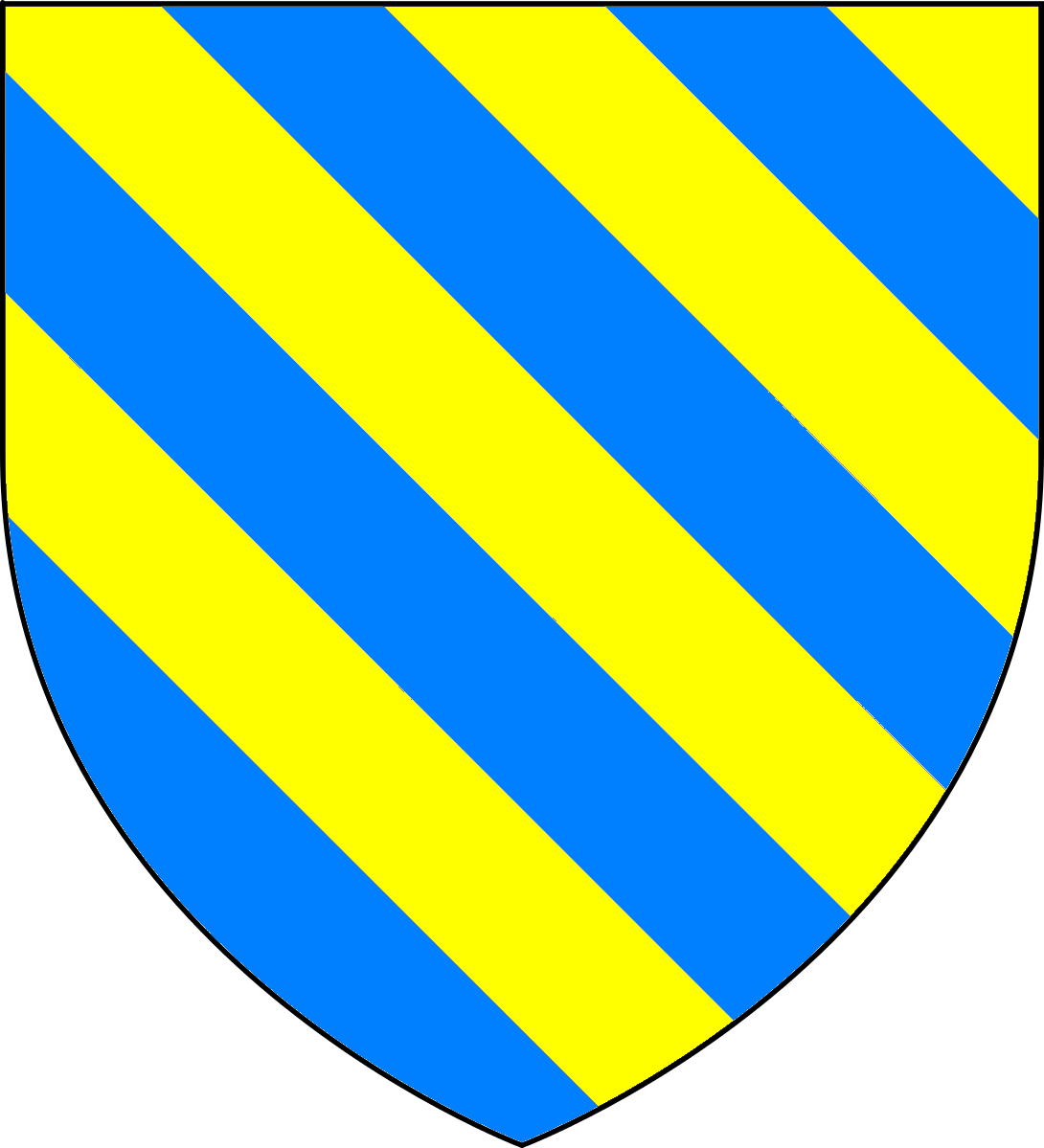
- Arms of Peter de Montfort: Bendy of eight Or and azure, as shown on the Dering Roll (1270/80)

Prolocutor of the English Parliament
- In office 1258–1264
- Monarch: Henry III

Personal details
- Born: c. 1205
- Died: 4 August 1265 (aged 59–60) Battle of Evesham
- Spouse: Alice Audley
- Children: Peter de Montfort; Robert de Montfort
- Parents: Thurstan de Montfort (father); daughter of William I de Cantilupe (mother)

Peter de Montfort (or Piers de Montfort) (c. 1205 – 4 August 1265) of Beaudesert Castle was an English magnate, soldier and diplomat. He is the first person recorded as having presided over Parliament as a parlour or prolocutor, an office now known as Speaker of the House of Commons. He was one of those elected by the barons to represent them during the constitutional crisis with Henry III in 1258. He was later a leading supporter of Simon de Montfort, 6th Earl of Leicester against the King. Both he and Simon de Montfort were slain at the Battle of Evesham on 4 August 1265.

== Life ==
Peter de Montfort was the son of Thurstan de Montfort (d.1216) by a daughter of William I de Cantilupe (d.1239) of Aston Cantilupe, Warwickshire, Steward of the Household to King John.

Montfort's principal estate was at Beaudesert Castle near Henley-in-Arden, Warwickshire, said to have been built by an earlier Thurstan de Montfort (died c.1170) on land granted by his great-uncle, Henry de Newburgh, Earl of Warwick; in 1141 Thurstan de Montfort had from the Empress Maud a charter for a market to be held at the castle every Sunday. It is thought to have been Peter de Montfort who walled the inner bailey in stone, work said to have been completed in January 1216.

After his father's death, Peter de Montfort's wardship was granted by King John to his grandfather, William I de Cantilupe (d.1239), and during that time Montfort developed a lasting friendship with his uncle, Walter de Cantilupe, Bishop of Worcester from 1238 to 1266. In 1236 he made a pilgrimage to Santiago de Compostela in the company of another of his uncles, William II de Cantilupe (d.1251). In 1242 he attended Henry III on an expedition to Poitou. At some earlier date, he took part in a prohibited tournament at Cambridge, as a result of which the King took his lands from him; they were restored in 1245.

Beaudesert was only nine miles from Kenilworth, which from 1244 on was the base of Simon de Montfort, 6th Earl of Leicester. According to Carpenter, it was likely this proximity which drew Montfort into the Earl's circle. He attested a number of the Earl's charters, and in the early autumn of 1248 was in his retinue while the Earl was Seneschal in Gascony. He had returned to England by 1251, when he was given custody of Horston Castle in Derbyshire, but by 1253 was back in Gascony.

Montfort accompanied the King's son, the future Edward I, to Spain when he married Eleanor of Castile in the summer of 1254, and on 19 September of that year acted as surety at Bordeaux for the King's debts. For the next two years he was sent on diplomatic missions by Henry III; however his foreign service appears to have ended in 1257, by which time he was a member of the royal council, had received an appointment in the Welsh Marches, and was serving as High Sheriff of Staffordshire and Shropshire.

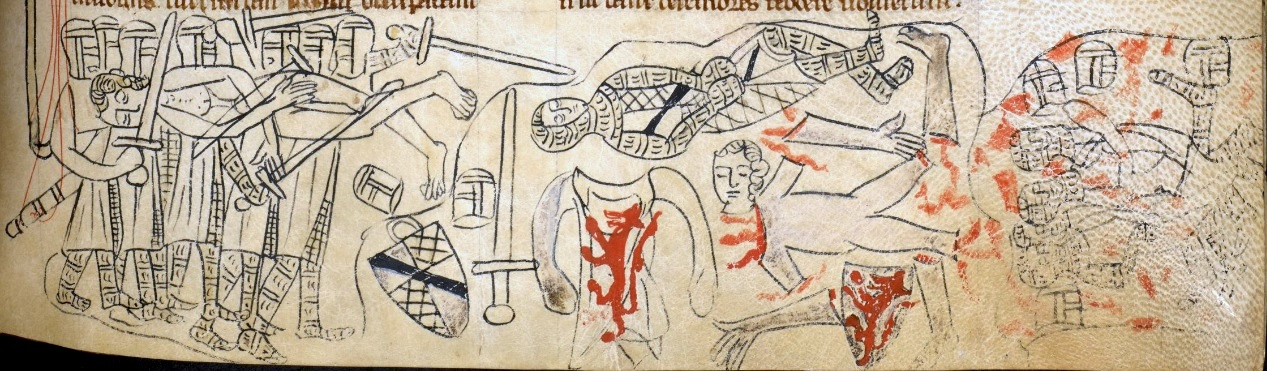
Depiction of death of Simon de Montfort at Evesham, at which battle Peter de Montfort was also slain

In April 1258 he and Simon de Montfort were among the seven magnates who revolted against Henry III (the Second Barons' War). He and the Earl were also among the twelve magnates who drew up plans for reform (the Provisions of Oxford), and were on the council of fifteen members set up to govern England in the King's name. He presided over a Parliament at Oxford in 1258, dubbed the "Mad Parliament" by the King's supporters, and was thus the earliest recorded presiding officer of the Commons, an office later known as Speaker, but then referred to as 'parlour' or 'prolocutor'. In the autumn of 1259 he was with the King and Queen when they travelled to France to arrange a peace with Louis IX. In the same year he was named an executor of Simon de Montfort's will.

On 12 April 1261, shortly before his death, Pope Alexander IV issued a papal bull which absolved Henry III of the oath he had taken to keep the Provisions of Oxford; when the King made this known in June of that year, Peter de Montfort was one of three arbitrators elected by the barons to negotiate with the King on their behalf. According to Cokayne, Montfort 'was now beginning to associate himself definitely with the baronial party', and as a result, the Sheriff of Warwickshire was ordered to prevent him from fortifying Beaudesert Castle. He took part with other barons in attacking Worcester, which fell on 28 February 1263 after several assaults. A temporary peace between the King and the barons was arranged in July of that year, and Montfort was given charge of Corfe Castle and Shirburn Castle.

Simon de Montfort had left England after Henry III's return to power, but was back in the country in April 1263. In March 1264 civil war again broke out, and Peter de Montfort sided with Simon de Montfort against the King. On 2 April 1264 he had a safe conduct to Brackley to meet with Henry III's envoys; however on the following day he and his two sons, Peter and Robert, were at Northampton Castle when the Keeper surrendered it to Simon de Montfort the Younger. On 5 April the castle was retaken by the King, and Peter de Montfort and his sons were taken prisoner and transported to Windsor. They were released after Simon de Montfort's victory at the Battle of Lewes.

During the subsequent dominance of Simon de Montfort, Peter de Montfort became one of a nine-member council forced upon the King in June 1264. Thereafter he played a principal role in the government of the country. On 11 September he was appointed one of the envoys who negotiated the reformation of the English government in the presence of Louis IX of France and the Papal Legate. On 16 November he and his heirs were granted the manor of Garthorpe, Leicestershire. On 20 December he was granted custody of Whittington Castle and Hereford Castle. He accompanied Simon de Montfort when the latter journeyed into Wales, and was joint keeper of the royal seal during that time.

He was with Simon de Montfort in his final campaign, and was slain with him at the Battle of Evesham on 4 August 1265. His two sons, Peter and Robert, who also took part in the battle, were both wounded and taken prisoner.

His place of burial is unknown. He was survived by his wife, Alice. His heirs in the male line died out in 1367.

Peter de Montfort's arms were Bendy of eight, Or and azure, although a seal of Peter de Montfort shows only bendy of six.

== Marriage and issue ==
Montfort married Alice Audley, daughter of Henry Audley, by whom he had two sons, Peter and Robert.

His eldest son, Peter de Montfort (d. before 4 March 1287), succeeded him. On 28 June 1267 he was pardoned by Henry III for 'all trespasses at the time of the disturbance in the kingdom', and eventually recovered part of his father's lands. He married Maud de la Mare, daughter of Sir Henry de la Mare (d.1257), of Ashtead, Surrey, by whom he had a son, John, and two daughters, Elizabeth and Alice:

- John de Montfort, Baron Montfort (d. before 11 May 1296). In 1280 his father granted his marriage to Edward I's wife, Eleanor of Castile. John de Montfort was summoned to Parliament on 24 June 1296 by writ directed Iohanni de Monte Forti, 'whereby he is held to have become Lord Montfort'. Before 28 March 1287 he married Alice de la Plaunche, the daughter of William de la Plaunche, by whom he had a son and heir, John de Montfort, 2nd Baron Montfort (1291 – 24 June 1314), who took part in the death of King Edward II's favourite, Piers Gaveston, for which he was eventually pardoned. He was slain at the Battle of Bannockburn, dying unmarried and without issue, and was succeeded by his younger brother, Peter de Montfort, 3rd Baron Montfort (d. before 24 January 1370), who also died without legitimate male issue, at which time any barony created by writ fell into abeyance among his two sisters.
- Elizabeth de Montfort, who married William Montagu, 2nd Baron Montagu, by whom she was the mother of four sons and seven daughters, including William Montagu, 1st Earl of Salisbury; Simon Montagu, successively Bishop of Worcester and Bishop of Ely; Elizabeth Montagu, Prioress of Holywell Priory; and Maud and Isabel Montagu, successively Abbesses of Barking Abbey.
- Alice de Montfort, who married firstly Warin de Lisle (d. before 7 December 1296), by whom she was the mother of Robert de Lisle, 1st Baron Lisle (d. 4 January 1343), and secondly Robert FitzWalter, 1st Baron FitzWalter.

== Notes ==
Political offices
Preceded by unknown	Presiding officer of the Commons; 1258–1265	Succeeded by unknown
