= Holywell Priory =

Coordinates: 51.525066°N 0.07995°W

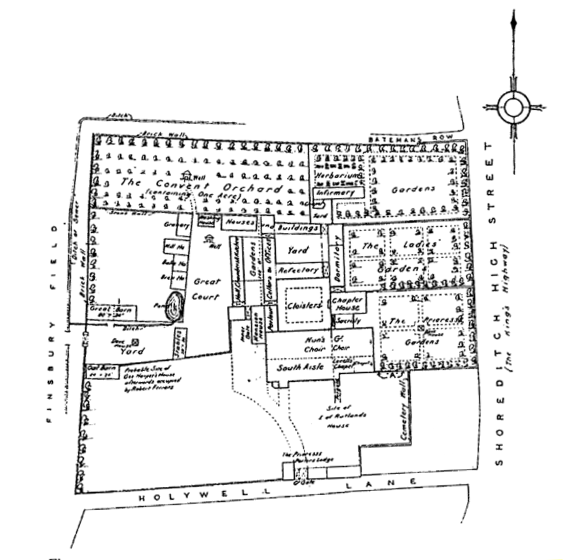
A map made in 1920, showing the details of the priory as they might have been in 1544 (from an agreement between Alice Hampton and the Prioress concerning her use of the Priory)

Holywell Priory or Haliwell, Halliwell, or Halywell (various spellings), was a religious house in Shoreditch, formerly in the historical county of Middlesex and now in the London Borough of Hackney. Its formal name was the Priory of St John the Baptist.

The Priory stood at Holywell Lane on the west side of Shoreditch towards Hoxton, its precinct lying within the area now bounded by Batemans Row, Shoreditch High Street, Holywell Lane, and Curtain Road.

== Foundation ==
It is sometimes said in secondary literature to be a Benedictine foundation, made by a Bishop of London, but it was certainly a house of Augustinian women, established in the twelfth century by Robert FitzGeneran (or Gelran), the second known holder of the prebend of Holywell or Finsbury in St. Paul's Cathedral (the prebend also passed to the Priory), his name occurring from 1133 to 1150. The founder made an endowment gift of three acres across the moor on which the Halliwell, or Holywell spring had its source.

In 1318 came a gift of six oaks from the forest of Essex from Edward II. However, the crown paid little attention to the priory, at least as far as royal patronage was concerned. More generally, there were few benefactions from magnates before the reign of Henry VII when as almost the last great benefactor, Sir Thomas Lovell, Chancellor of the Exchequer appeared on the scene and virtually refounded the house. He caused extensive building work at the priory, including the construction of a chapel in which he was buried in 1524.

The size of the community doubtless varied over the years. In 1379 there were eleven professed nuns in the priory. At the election of the Prioress Elizabeth Prudde in 1472, it is recorded that seven nuns and ten novices were present. At the election in 1534 of the last prioress, Sybil Newdigate, there were 13 professed nuns and 4 novices present.

Apart from paid lay employees, there were also lay brothers attached to the priory. They may never have been very numerous. In 1314 a complaint was lodged about two brothers misappropriating property at Shoreditch. From an earlier period, we know the name of one of the brothers, Peter, whose father was Odo, a smith who in 1275 gave rents in London to the priory for his son.

== Known prioresses ==
The list given here is incomplete. The dates given refer to mentions in the historical record as prioress or to the period covered by several mentions, presuming continuity of office.

- Magdalena (about 1185 or 1210)
- Clementia (1193–1204)
- Maud (1224)
- Agnes (1239–1240)
- Juliana or Gillian (1248–1261)
- Benigna (reign of Henry III)
- Isabel (1261)
- Christina or Christine of Kent (1269–1284)
- Alice (1293)
- Christine (1314)
- Albreda or Aubrey (about 1320)
- Lucy of Colney (1328–1330)
- Mary of Stortford (1330–1334)
- Theophania (1335–1336)
- Elizabeth Montacute (1337–1357)
- Ellen or Elena Gosham (1362–1363, mentioned as the "late prioress" in 1375)
- Isabella Norton (1387–1392)
- Edith Griffith (1400–1409)
- Elizabeth Arundel (1428–1432)
- Clementia or Clemence Freeman (1432–1444)
- Joan Sevenok or Sevenoak (1462–1472)
- Elizabeth Prudde (1472–1474)
- Joan Lynde (1515–1534)
- Sybil Newdigate (1534–1539), the last Prioress.

== A particular case: Prioress Elizabeth Montacute ==
Elizabeth Montacute also Montagu, originally de Mont Aigu (of the sharp mountain) and Latinised to de Monte Acuto, seems to have served as Prioress of Holywell at least in the years 1340–1357.

Dame Elizabeth was particularly well connected. She was the third daughter of William Montagu, 2nd Baron Montagu of the first creation (died 1319) and Elizabeth Montfort (died 1354), daughter of the knight Sir Peter de Montfort, who survived her first husband and married Sir Thomas Furnivall of Sheffield, without royal licence, for which the groom was fined £200. On her death in 1354, the now widowed Lady Furnivall was buried in the Priory of St Frideswide, Oxford (now Christ Church Cathedral, Oxford), where her tomb still exists in the Latin chapel.

The four brothers and six sisters of the nun, Dame Elizabeth, included William (1301–1344), who succeeded his father as 3rd Baron Montagu, and later became 1st Earl of Salisbury, and who was the "most intimate personal friend" of King Edward III, and Edward de Montacute, 1st Baron Montacute of the second creation (died 1361), who married Alice of Norfolk, a granddaughter of Edward I. A third brother, Simon (died 1345), was successively Bishop of Worcester and Bishop of Ely. Dame Elizabeth's sisters were Alice, Katherine, Mary and Hawise, all of whom married at least once; and Maud and Isabel, who both became successively Abbess of Barking Abbey from 1341 to 1352.

Apart from these family connections, the historical record mentions two incidents connected with Elizabeth de Montagu's life as a nun. The first is more personal. When exactly Elizabeth entered the priory of Holywell as a nun, is not clear. In 1334 a Westminster Abbey made a grant to Holywell Priory of a yearly pension of 100 shillings to cover Elizabeth's food and clothing, alleging four considerations: that Elizabeth had no personal means from which to provide for her own sustenance; that Holywell Priory had insufficient funds to cover the expense; that the abbey had received many benefactions from her family, especially from her brother Simon, Bishop of Worcester, and that the abbey had formerly paid the same amount to the bishop. Odd as this sounds, it is true that Elizabeth's father had died in 1319, her mother had married again before 8 June 1322 and was widowed a second time before 18 April 1332. It is possible that there may have been a technical requirement for the payment of a dowry for a nun entering the Priory community, which her brother, as a churchman, arranged to be paid in some roundabout fashion. It sounds likely that at this juncture she had only recently entered the monastery. The prioress and nuns gave permission for Elizabeth to receive the pension and dispose of it herself. Moreover, the following year it was confirmed by both the Bishop of London and the King, and records show it being paid not only in 1335 but also in 1351.

In any case, Elizabeth's situation was not so precarious as the matter of the pension might make it sound, for by Michaelmas 1340 she is mentioned as Prioress of Holywell in a lawsuit. It is as Prioress, too, that she was present at the blessing of her sister, Maud, as Abbess of Barking, on 29 April 1341, along with her brother Bishop Simon.

Finally, perhaps the intricate interconnections between social and economic status, dynastic marriages and convent life explain why, in response to a complain lodged by "Elizabeth, prioress of Halewell", King Edward III on 26 January 1357 ordered an investigation into an incident when a group of men broke violently into the Priory and abducted Joan, the daughter of John of Coggeshall (or Coggeshale), who had been committed to the Prioress's safekeeping by Henry Galeys, Elizabeth having pledged to restore Joan unmarried. It appears that the intruders had caused the woman to undergo a form of marriage. The case may not be concerned so much with romantic elopement as with sordid exploitation of a woman in order to secure economic gain. The names John of Coggeshall (or Coggeshale) and Henry Galeys (or Waleys) seems to lead us into the trade and financial dealings of the medieval city of London. Anyhow, this appears to be the last mention of Elizabeth in the surviving historical records.

== Elizabeth Prudde ==
We know some details of the priory from an agreement made between Alice Hampton and the prioress Elizabeth Prudde in 1492. Alice was the only known unmarried vowess; she was rich and had influence in London. She had inherited her uncle's riches but also his influence. She paid the prioress eight pounds of pepper a year. In exchange for this she was allowed to use her well and washing facilities and to make changes to the building's structures. She arranged for her living area to have a view of the church altar and for a locked entrance to her garden. She had her own exit and a dedicated pew in the Lady Chapel, however she lived in two rooms that were just over 18 feet by ten feet.

== The last prioress, Sybil Newdigate ==
The last Prioress of Holywell, Dame Sybil Newdigate, was the daughter of John Newdigate (died 1528), a Sergeant-at-law, and his wife Amphyllis (or Amphelisia) (née Neville) (died 1544). We have access to some details about the family from the Newdigate Cartulary.

Dame Sybil was herself born on the Eve of St Thomas, 2 July 1509 at Harefield, Middlesex, and was the youngest daughter and 12th child of her parents' fourteen children. Her Godfather was the priest Robert Malber and she had two Godmothers, Sybil Bynchestre (Binchester) and Isabell Antony. Her sponsor at Confirmation was John Bynchestre. Although the family had known social success, the 1530s brought some grim moments, and not just the dissolution of Holywell Priory. Among Sybil's brothers and sisters was Sebastian, almost nine years her elder, who as a young man was a courtier and member of Henry VIII's Privy Chamber, on close personal terms with the King. However, he later entered the Carthusian Priory or Charterhouse in London as a monk, being also ordained a deacon (on 3 June 1531) and prior to his death, a priest. He was arrested on 25 May 1535 for refusal to accept the King's assumption of supremacy over the English church, and underwent harsh imprisonment, during which he was twice visited by the King but resisted Henry's blandishments. Condemned to death for treason, on 19 June he was dragged to Tyburn on a hurdle, and hanged, drawn and quartered. Regarded as a martyr for the Catholic faith, Sebastian was beatified by Pope Leo XIII on 9 December 1886.

Five years after the Dissolution, Dame Sybil, then aged 35, is mentioned in the will of her brother George Newdigate, dated 13 August 1544. George left £10 a year to be paid by his widow "to my Sister Sybell". If his widow were to die during the minority of his children, his "landes, annuities and Rentes do remayne to my syster, Sibell Newdegate, and she to have the dysposing of them to thuse of my children, and if they dye the remaynder to her only, whome I make overseer of this my last will and testament". George was three years older than Sybil, and was the sibling born to their parents immediately before her, on 26 April 1506. Sybil is known to have been alive still in 1549.

== Dissolution ==
It is documented that when Holywell Priory was formally dissolved on 10 October 1539, the convent then comprised 14 nuns, including the prioress and subprioress. Prioress Sybil Newdigate received a pension of £50, the subprioress, Ellen Claver or Claire or Cavour, £6 13 shillings and 4 pence, and twelve nuns pensions varying from 53 shillings and 4 pence, and to 93 shillings and 4 pence each. The other nuns are named as Margerye Frauncis, Alice Martyn, Alice Goldwell, Kateryn Grene, Kateryn Fogge, Isabell Gine, Beatrix Lewes, Mary Good, Elene Clave, Agnes Bolney, Alice Frelond and Cristyane Skypper. Of these women, sixteen years later, on 24 February 1556, six were still drawing their pension.

== The fate of the priory buildings ==
The loss of this functioning institution must have had notable effects on the social and economic life of the area. The Priory precinct covered about eight acres. Already in the year of the Priory's surrender, one Thomas Pointz mentioned it in a letter he wrote to Thomas Cromwell in the hope of acquiring a suppressed monastic house as a dwelling for his family. However, it would seem that nothing happened, for it was some years after the Dissolution of the community, that the part which had been occupied directly by the nuns was granted by sale on 23 September 1544, to Henry Webb, then a gentleman usher to Queen Catherine Parr. It would seem that there may have been distant family connections by marriage between the Queen and the Webb family. The property that went to Webb is described as including the hall and all the rooms, kitchens and buildings both upstairs and downstairs; extensive other houses and other buildings in several blocks, including the fratry (frater), both upstairs and downstairs; several barns, brewhouses, granaries, stables, workshops, dovecotes, etc., and various plots of land, including several garden areas, among which the prioress's garden and the convent orchard, of one acre. The priory chapel was speedily demolished, as may have been a more or less formal requirement for this kind of purchase from the crown. After Webb's death in 1553 the property passed to his daughter and her husband (Susan and George Peckham) who sold it in 1555, sold it to Christopher Bumsted, who soon mortgaged it to Christopher Allen and his son Giles. After Christopher Allen's death, Bumsted quarrelled with the son, who however manage to gain possession, at least by the time of his own death in 1609, upon which it was quickly sold on to others. The remains of the Priory were popularly known for a time as "King John's Palace", though by the end of the 18th century there was little left to see.

== A Shakespearean connection ==
In 1576, James Burbage, a joiner, actor and impresario, leased land on the former property of Holywell Priory. There he built The Theatre, one of the first purpose-built London play-houses since Roman times. It was probably here that the playing company or actors' company Leicester's Men played from the early days, and in the 1580s the Admiral's Men. From 1594 to 1597, it was the venue for The Lord Chamberlain's Men. It was for them and their successors that Shakespeare wrote and acted for most of his career, and it was at The Theatre that some of Shakespeare's early plays had their première. A dispute arose with the landlord, Giles Allen, when the twenty-one-year-old lease ran out. Failing to reach an agreement for its extension, James Burbage's son, Cuthbert hired Peter Streete to take down the old Theatre and to build a new one using as much of the salvaged material as possible. With the help of others, on the night of 28 December 1598, the structure was dismantled and the materials were transported across the River Thames and reassembled there on Bankside in Southwark, as The Globe, which was functioning by the following September.

== See also ==
- St John the Baptist, Hoxton
- List of monastic houses in Middlesex
- List of monastic houses in England
- Essex village of Holloway Down, now part of Leytonstone
