= Baron Montagu =

Extinct barony in the Peerage of England

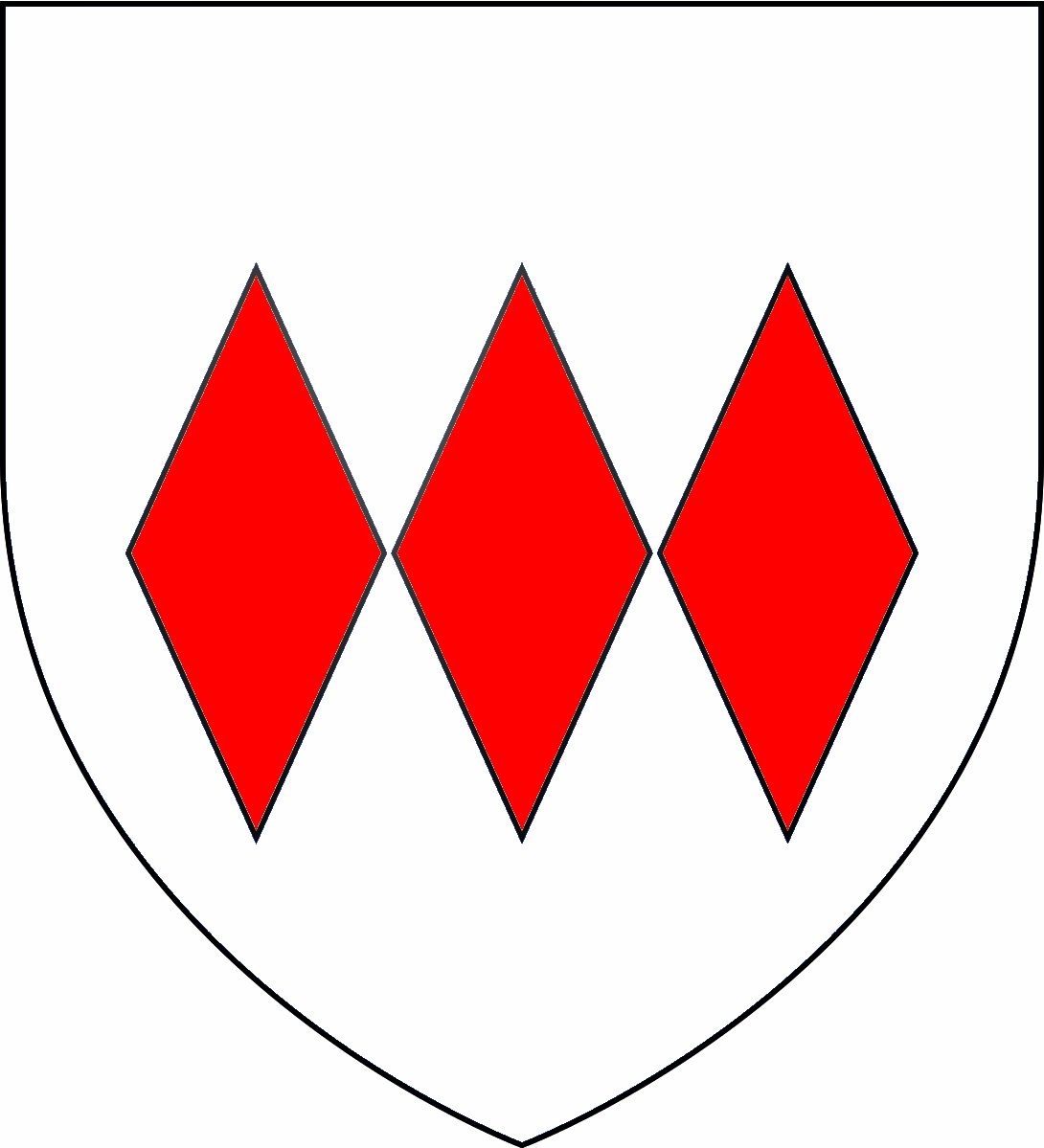
Montagu arms unquartered of Barons Montagu/Montacute

Arms of John Montacute, 3rd Earl of Salisbury(d. 1400): Quarterly, 1st & 4th: Argent, 3 fusils conjoined in fess gules (Montagu); 2nd & 3rd: Or, an eagle displayed vert beaked and membered gules (Monthermer)

The titles Baron Montacute or Baron Montagu were created several times in the Peerage of England for members of the House of Montagu. The family name was Latinised to de Monte Acuto, meaning "from the sharp mountain"; the French form is an ancient spelling of mont aigu, with identical meaning.

== Montacute ==
The first creation was for Simon de Montagu (d. 1316), who was summoned to parliament on 29 December 1299. The third baron was created Earl of Salisbury in 1337. On the death of the third earl, both titles became forfeit under attainder in 1400. Both titles were restored in 1421 for the heir, Thomas Montagu, 4th Earl of Salisbury. On his death, the barony was inherited by his daughter Alice, who was married to Richard Neville. After the death of their eldest son Richard Neville, the Kingmaker, the barony either fell into abeyance or became dormant in 1471. In 1485, it was restored to Edward Plantagenet, but he was attainted and the peerages forfeited again in 1499, when he died. In 1513, his sister Margaret was restored to the barony. When she was restored to the earldom of Salisbury in 1529, her son became the eleventh Baron Montacute, but he also was created Baron Montagu by writ of summons in 1529. Both baronies became forfeited at the attainder of the latter and his mother in 1539.

The second creation was for Edward Montagu, 1st Baron Montagu, son of William Montagu, 2nd Baron Montagu and Elizabeth Montfort. He was summoned to Parliament from 20 November 1348 to 20 November 1360 by writs directed Edwardo de Monte Acuto, 'whereby he is held to have become Lord Montagu'. He died 14 July 1361. His son by his first marriage having predeceased him, his heir was his seven-week-old son by his second marriage, Edward, who survived him by only three months, dying on 4 October 1361, at which time any barony created by writ fell into abeyance, according to modern doctrine, among the surviving daughters of his father. In 1361 the only surviving daughter of Edward de Montagu's first marriage to Alice of Norfolk was Joan de Montagu, then aged 12. She married William de Ufford, 2nd Earl of Suffolk, by whom she had four sons and a daughter, none of whom survived her. At her death before 27 June 1376, 'according to modern doctrine, the barony emerged from abeyance, and vested in her half-sister, Audrey de Montagu, the only surviving daughter of her father's second marriage'.

The third creation was for John de Montacute who was summoned to parliament on 15 February 1357. His successor (his son?) succeeded in the earldom of Salisbury in 1397 with which title it then merged. Either it had the same fate as the first creation, or it has stayed forfeited since 1400, 1471 or 1499.

== Montagu ==
The first creation was for John Neville, the younger brother of the Kingmaker. John Neville was summoned to parliament on 23 May 1461. He was created Marquess of Montagu in 1470. At his death in 1471, both titles became forfeit under his attainder.

As mentioned above, there was a fifth creation in 1529 that became forfeit under attainder.

== Barons Montagu (1299) ==
- Simon de Montagu, 1st Baron Montagu (d. 1316)
- William de Montagu, 2nd Baron Montagu (d. 1319)
- William de Montagu, 3rd Baron Montagu (1301–1344) created Earl of Salisbury in 1337
- William de Montagu, 2nd Earl of Salisbury, 4th Baron Montagu (1328–1397)
- John Montagu, 3rd Earl of Salisbury, 5th Baron Montagu (1350–1400) (forfeit 1400)
- Thomas Montagu, 4th Earl of Salisbury, 6th Baron Montagu (1388–1428) (restored 1421, although styled and summoned to parliament as such from at least 1409)
- Alice Montagu, 5th Countess of Salisbury, 7th Baroness Montagu (1407–1461)
  - Richard Neville, 5th Earl of Salisbury, 7th Baron Montagu (1400–1460) jure uxoris
- Richard Neville, 16th Earl of Warwick, 8th Baron Montagu (1428–1471) (abeyant 1471)
- Edward Plantagenet, 17th Earl of Warwick, 9th Baron Montagu (1474–1499) (restored 1485, attainted and forfeit 1499)
- Margaret Pole, 8th Countess of Salisbury, 10th Baroness Montagu (1473–1541) (restored 1513, forfeit 1539)

== Barons Montacute (1342) ==
- Edward de Montacute, 1st Baron Montacute (d. 1361)
- Joan de Ufford, 2nd Baroness Montacute (1349–1375) (extinct 1375)

== Barons Montagu (1357) ==
- John de Montagu, 1st Baron Montagu (d. 1390). younger son of the 1st Earl of Salisbury, above
- John de Montagu, 2nd Baron Montagu (1350–1400) succeeded to the earldom of Salisbury in 1397 (forfeit 1400)
- Thomas Montagu, 3rd Baron Montagu (1388–1428) (restored 1421, although styled and summoned to parliament as such from at least 1409)
- Alice Montagu, 4th Baroness Montagu (1407–1461)
  - Richard Neville, 4th Baron Montagu (1400–1460) jure uxoris
- Richard Neville, 5th Baron Montagu and jure uxoris 16th Earl of Warwick ("Warwick the Kingmaker") (1428–1471) (abeyant in 1471)
- Edward Plantagenet, 6th Baron Montagu (1475–1499) (abeyance terminated 1485; forfeit 1499)
- Margaret Plantagenet, 7th Baroness Montagu (1474–1541) (restored 1513; forfeit 1539)

== Baron Montagu (1461) ==
- see Marquess of Montagu. Forfeit 1471

== Baron Montagu (1514) ==
- Henry Pole, 1st Baron Montagu (c. 1492–1539) (forfeit 1538)

== Other Montagu titles ==
For titles in the name of Montagu conferred on the later family of Montagu (previously Ladde) and their descendants, see:

- Baron Montagu of Kimbolton (1620; extant) a subsidiary title of the Duke of Manchester
- Baron Montagu of Boughton (1621; extinct 1749), later a subsidiary title of the Earl (1689), then Duke of Montagu (1705)
- Baron Montagu of St Neots (1660; extant) a subsidiary title of the Earl of Sandwich
- Earl of Montagu (1689; extinct 1749)
- Duke of Montagu (1705; extinct 1749)

For titles conferred on the family of Brudenell (name changed to Montagu), descendant of the family of Montagu, see:

- Baron Montagu of Boughton (1762; extinct 1770)
- Duke of Montagu (1766; extinct 1790)
- Baron Montagu of Boughton (1786; extinct 1845). This title passed on the family of Scott.

Title conferred on the family of Douglas-Scott-Montagu, descendant of the family of Brudenell-Montagu:

- Baron Montagu of Beaulieu (1885; extant)

Title conferred on the family of Browne :

- Viscount Montagu (1554; dormant 1797)
