= Edward of Norfolk =

14th century English noble

- Born: c.1313
- Died: before 9 August 1334
- Noble family: Plantagenet
- Spouse: Beatrice Mortimer
- Father: Thomas of Brotherton
- Mother: Alice Hales

Edward of Norfolk or Edward of Brotherton (c.1313 – before 9 August 1334), was the only son of Thomas of Brotherton, and a grandson of King Edward I of England.

== Life ==
Born about 1313, Edward was the only son of Thomas of Brotherton, eldest son of King Edward I by his second marriage to Margaret of France (1279?–1318), the daughter of King Philippe III of France (d.1285). His mother was Alice de Hales (d. in or before 1330), daughter of Sir Roger de Hales of Hales Hall in Loddon in Roughton, Norfolk, by his wife Alice Skogan. He had two sisters:

- Margaret, Duchess of Norfolk (d. 24 March 1399), who married firstly John Segrave, 4th Baron Segrave, by whom she had two sons and two daughters, and secondly Sir Walter Manny.
- Alice of Norfolk (d. 30 January 1352), who married, before 29 August 1338, Sir Edward Montagu (d. 14 July 1361), by whom she had a son and two daughters.

Shortly after 29 May 1328, at Hereford, Edward of Norfolk married Beatrice Mortimer, daughter of Roger Mortimer, 1st Earl of March, by Joan de Geneville (d.1356), daughter and coheiress of Sir Peter de Geneville. The occasion was a double wedding at which the bride's sister, Agnes Mortimer, married Laurence Hastings, later 1st Earl of Pembroke. The celebrations were accompanied by a magnificent tournament, and were attended by Edward III and his mother, Isabella of France, who was by then the mistress of the bride's father, Roger Mortimer. There was no issue of the marriage, and two years after the ceremony Roger de Mortimer was hanged at Tyburn as a common criminal.

Edward of Norfolk died before 9 August 1334, predeceasing his father.

His widow married, before 13 September 1337, Sir Thomas de Brewes (d. 9 or 16 June 1361), son and heir of Sir Peter de Brewes of Tetbury, Gloucestershire, and his wife Agnes de Clifford, by whom she had three sons and three daughters.

After the death of Thomas of Brotherton on 4 August 1338, Edward of Norfolk's elder sister, Margaret, succeeded to the earldom of Norfolk.

== Ancestry ==
Ancestors of Edward of Norfolk

16. John of England
8. Henry III of England
17. Isabella of Angoulême
4. Edward I of England
18. Ramon Berenguer IV, Count of Provence
9. Eleanor of Provence
19. Beatrice of Savoy
2. Thomas of Brotherton, 1st Earl of Norfolk
20. Louis IX of France
10. Philip III of France
21. Margaret of Provence
5. Margaret of France
22. Henry III, Duke of Brabant
11. Marie of Brabant
23. Adelaide of Burgundy
1. Edward of Norfolk
24. Walter de Hales
12. Ralph de Hales
25. Eleanor Berenger
6. Sir Roger de Hales of Hales Hall
26. William le Clauer
13. Dementa le Clauer
27. Katherine le Strange
3. Alice Hales
14. Roger Skogan
7. Alice Skogan
15. Alice
