= Simon Montacute =

14th-century Bishop of Ely and Bishop of Worcester

- Bishop of Ely
- Appointed: 14 March 1337
- Term ended: 20 June 1345
- Predecessor: John Hotham
- Successor: Thomas de Lisle
- Previous post: Bishop of Worcester

Orders
- Consecration: 8 May 1334

Personal details
- Died: 20 June 1345
- Denomination: Catholic

Simon Montacute (died 1345) was a medieval Bishop of Worcester and Bishop of Ely.

Montacute was the third son of William Montagu, 2nd Baron Montagu (d. 18 October 1319), by Elizabeth Montfort (d. August 1354), daughter of Sir Piers Montfort of Beaudesert, Warwickshire. He had two elder brothers, John, who died in August 1317, and William Montagu, 1st Earl of Salisbury, and a younger brother, Edward Montagu, 1st Baron Montagu, who married Alice of Norfolk, daughter of Thomas of Brotherton and granddaughter of Edward I. Among his seven sisters were Elizabeth, Prioress of Halliwell, and Maud and Isabel, successively Abbesses of Barking from 1341 to 1358.

Montacute was nominated to the see of Worcester on 11 December 1333 and consecrated on 8 May 1334. and was then translated to the see of Ely on 14 March 1337. As bishop of Ely, he was involved in the foundation of Peterhouse, Cambridge, being largely responsible for an early set of statutes for the college. He died on 20 June 1345.

== Citations ==
Catholic Church titles
Preceded by Adam de Orlton	Bishop of Worcester; 1333–1337	Succeeded by Thomas Hemenhale
Preceded by John Hotham	Bishop of Ely; 1337–1345	Succeeded by Thomas de Lisle
