= Beaudesert =

Beaudesert may refer to:

== Australia ==
- Beaudesert, Queensland, a town in Queensland, Australia
  - Electoral district of Beaudesert, an Australian electoral district, which includes the town of Beaudesert, Queensland
  - Shire of Beaudesert, a former local government area of Queensland, Australia

== United Kingdom ==
- Beaudesert, Warwickshire, a village and civil parish in Warwickshire, England
  - Beaudesert Castle, an archaeological site in the village of Beaudesert in Warwickshire, England
- Beaudesert (House), the Staffordshire country seat of the Paget family – the Marquess of Anglesey
- Beaudesert Park School, a prep school in Gloucestershire, England
