= Elizabeth de Montfort, Baroness Montagu =

English noblewoman (died 1354)

Elizabeth Montfort
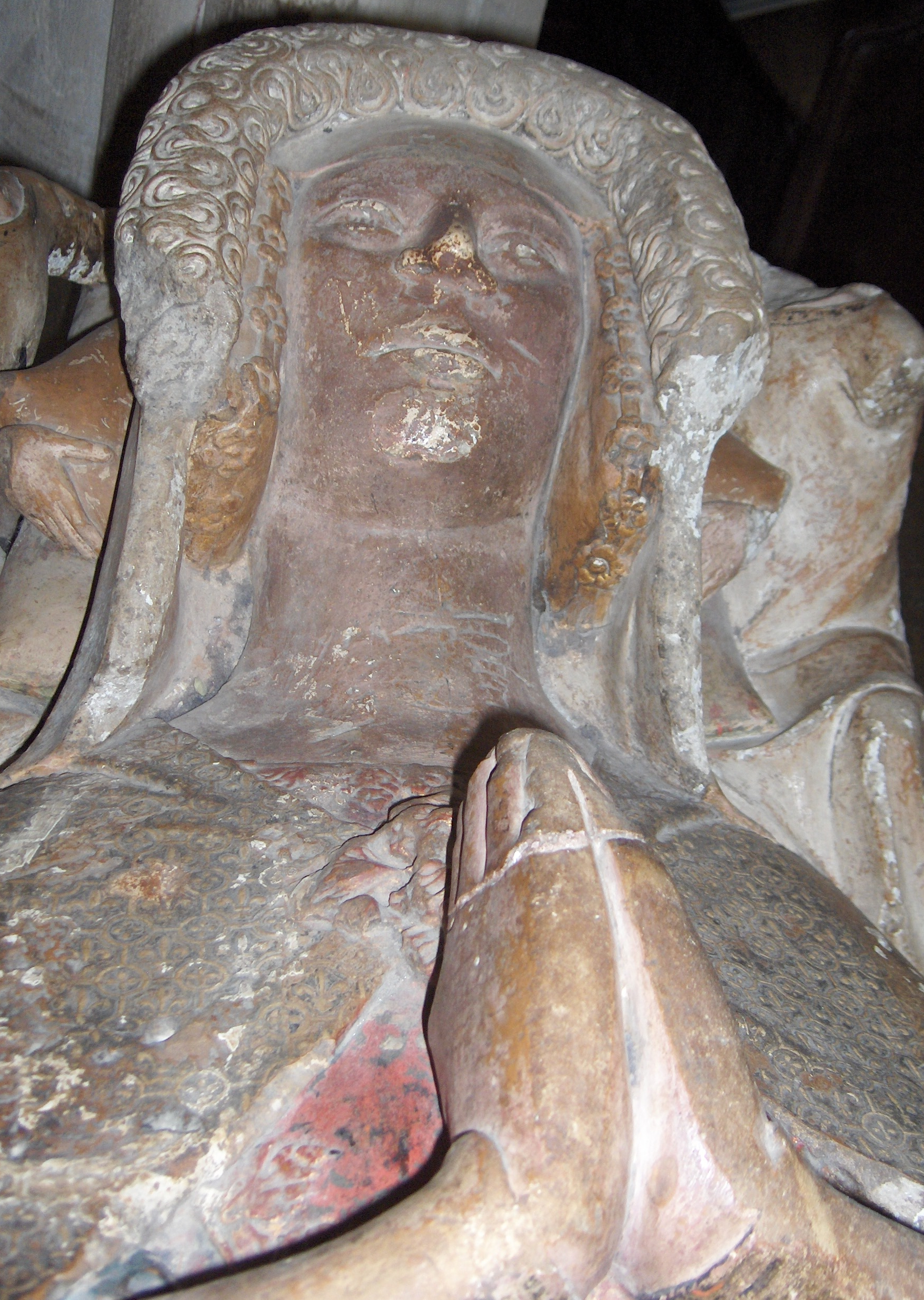
- Effigy of Elizabeth Montfort in Christ Church Cathedral, Oxford
- Died: August 1354
- Buried: Priory of St Frideswide, Oxford
- Spouses: William Montagu, 2nd Baron Montagu; Thomas Furnivall, Baron Furnivall
- Issue: John Montagu; William Montagu; Simon Montagu; Edward Montagu; Alice Montagu; Katherine Montagu; Mary Montagu; Elizabeth Montagu; Hawise Montagu; Maud Montagu; Isabel Montagu
- Father: Sir Peter Montfort
- Mother: Maud de la Mare

Lady Elizabeth de Montfort, Baroness Montagu (died August 1354) was an English noblewoman.

== Life ==
Elizabeth de Montfort was the daughter of Peter de Montfort (d. before 4 March 1287) of Beaudesert Castle in Warwickshire and his wife, Maud de la Mare. Her grandfather was Peter de Montfort (1205–1265), the first Speaker of the House of Commons, whose wife was Alice Audley.

Her marriage to William Montagu was arranged by Eleanor of Castile, the first wife of King Edward I of England. Edward was eager to make peace with the barons after the Second Barons' War, and things were fairly well patched up within a few years. His wife's role in arranging the marriage was part of an elaborate system of arranged marriages designed to reinforce the power of the King and his aristocracy.

Both Elizabeth and her husband came from wealthy families, and they donated some of their money to various causes. Elizabeth was a major benefactor of the Priory of St Frideswide, Oxford, now Christ Church Cathedral at Oxford University. Her tomb now lies between the Latin Chapel, whose construction she funded, and the Dean's Chapel, where she was originally buried under its magnificent painted ceiling (now faded by time).

She also donated a large piece of land to St. Frideswide in exchange for a chantry. This meant that two chantry priests would say daily mass in black robes bearing the Montacute and Montfort coats of arms. This continued until the Reformation. This piece of land, just south of the church is now called Christ Church Meadow. Later, the path through this was named Christ Church Walk and is now a very popular attraction in Oxford.

== Marriages and issue ==
She married firstly, about 1292, William Montagu, 2nd Baron Montagu, by whom she had four sons and seven daughters:

- John Montagu, eldest son and heir, who in 1317 married his father's ward, Joan de Verdun (d. 2 October 1334), daughter and heir of Theobald de Verdun by Maud Mortimer, daughter of Edmund Mortimer, 2nd Baron Mortimer, in the royal chapel at Windsor Park, Berkshire, by whom he had no issue. He predeceased his father, and was buried at Lincoln Cathedral on 14 August 1317. His widow, Joan, married, on 24 February 1318, Sir Thomas Furnivall (d. October 1339), by whom she had three sons and two daughters.
- William Montagu, 1st Earl of Salisbury (1301–1344), who succeeded as 3rd Baron Montagu.
- Simon Montagu (d.1345), who was successively Bishop of Worcester and Bishop of Ely.
- Edward Montagu (d. 14 July 1361), who married firstly, before 29 August 1338, Alice of Norfolk (d. before 30 January 1352), daughter and coheir of Thomas of Brotherton, and granddaughter of Edward I, by whom he had a son and four daughters. Alice of Norfolk is said to have died as the result of an assault by her husband and his retainers. He married secondly a wife named Joan, whose parentage is unknown, by whom he had a son and two daughters.
- Alice Montagu, eldest daughter, who married, before 27 January 1333, as his first wife, Sir Ralph Daubeney (3 March 1305 – c.1378), by whom she was the mother of Sir Giles Daubeney (d. 24 June 1386).
- Katherine Montagu, who married Sir William Carrington.
- Mary Montagu, who married Sir Richard Cogan (d.1368) of Bampton, Devon.
- Elizabeth Montagu, Prioress of Halliwell.
- Hawise Montagu, who married Sir Roger Bavent (d. 23 April 1355), by whom she had a daughter, Joan, who married Sir John Dauntsey (d.1391).
- Maud Montagu, Abbess of Barking from 1341 to 1352.
- Isabel Montagu, Abbess of Barking from 1352 to 1358.

She married secondly Thomas de Furnivall, 1st Baron Furnivall (d. before 18 April 1332), who was pardoned and fined £200 on 8 June 1322 for marrying her without royal licence.
