= William Montagu, 2nd Baron Montagu =

English peer, soldier and courtier

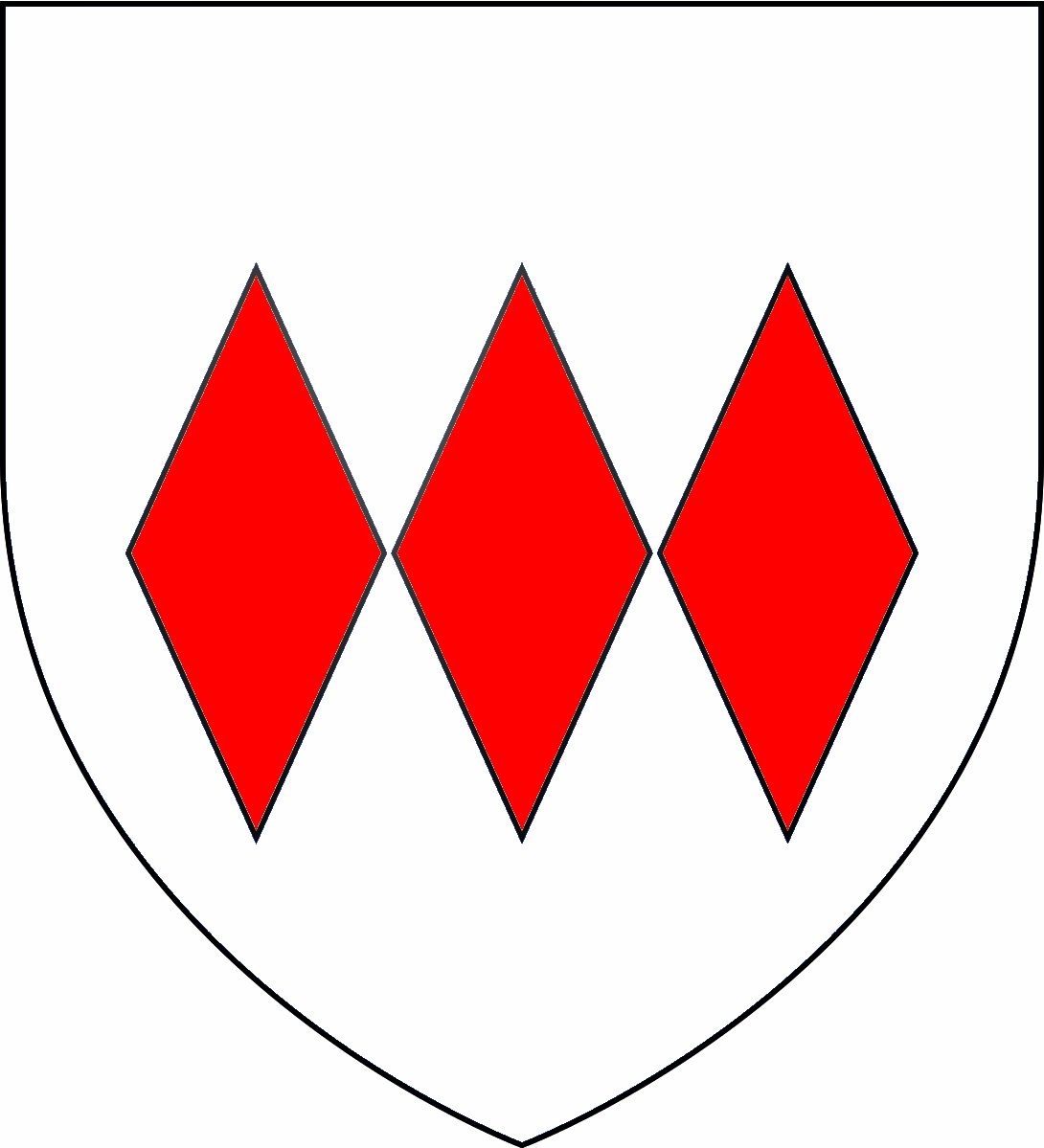
- Arms of Montagu: Argent, three fusils conjoined in fess gules
- Born: c.1275
- Died: 18 October 1319; Gascony
- Spouse: Elizabeth de Montfort
- Issue: John Montagu; William Montagu, 1st Earl of Salisbury; Simon Montagu; Edward Montagu, 1st Baron Montagu; Alice Montagu; Katherine Montagu; Mary Montagu; Elizabeth Montagu; Hawise Montagu; Maud Montagu; Isabel Montagu
- Father: Simon Montagu
- Mother: Hawise St Amand, or Isabel (surname unknown)

William Montagu, 2nd Baron Montagu (c. 1275 – 18 October 1319) (alias de Montagu, de Montacute, Latinized to de Monte Acuto ("from the sharp mountain")), was an English peer, and an eminent soldier and courtier during the reigns of Edward I and Edward II. He played a significant role in the wars in Scotland and Wales, and was appointed steward of the household to Edward II. Perhaps as a result of the influence of his enemy, Thomas, 2nd Earl of Lancaster, Edward II sent him to Gascony as Seneschal in 1318. He died there in October of the following year.

== Origins ==
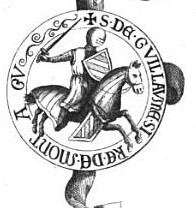
Seal of William Montagu, 2nd Baron Montagu, inscribed in Latin: S(IGILLUM) DE GUILLAUME SIRE DE MONTAGU ("seal of William, lord of the manor of Montagu"). The arms displayed by the knight are apparently those of Peter de Montfort (died before 4 March 1287) (Bendy of eight or and azure) (son of Peter de Montfort of Beaudesert Castle), the father-in-law of William Montagu, 2nd Baron Montagu

William Montagu was born in about 1275, the son and heir of Simon de Montagu, 1st Baron Montagu (d. 26 September 1316), by either his first wife, Hawise de St Amand (died 1287), daughter of Amaury de St Amand, or his second wife, Isabel, whose parentage is unknown. The Montagu family was of Norman origin, later prominent in the West Country of England. They held extensive lands in Somerset, Dorset and Devon. From his father's inquisition post mortem, he is known to have had two brothers, John Montagu and Simon Montagu.

== Career ==
Montagu spent a great part of his life serving in the wars in Scotland, Wales and on the continent. He distinguished himself in the First War of Scottish Independence, having been summoned for feudal military service in 1301 and placed in charge of shipping for the war in March 1303.

In 1304, he was with King Edward I at the Siege of Stirling Castle. In the same year he and his uncle, Amaury de St Amand, were imprisoned in the Tower of London for an alleged offence for which he was soon acquitted. On 22 May 1306, he and others were knighted by King Edward I (1272–1307), together with the king's son the Prince of Wales and future King Edward II (1307–1327).

In February 1307, he and his father served together in Scotland, and in 1309 he took part in the first tournament at Dunstable in which he bore the arms Argent, three fusils conjoined in fess gules, as recorded in the Dunstable Roll.

In 1311, he was appointed to survey the defences of Hastings Castle and other castles, and on 29 September 1311 was placed in charge of Berkhamstead Castle. In 1314 he was appointed Keeper of Berwick Castle.

In May 1313, he attended King Edward II and his wife Isabella of France when they travelled to France to pay a state visit to King Philip IV, and in the same year and in 1314 served again in Scotland. In February 1316 he played a leading part in suppressing a rebellion in Glamorgan by Llywelyn Bren (died 1318), and, in July 1316, was sent to Bristol to settle grievances between the town's burgesses and Bartholomew de Badlesmere, 1st Baron Badlesmere (died 1322), Constable of Bristol Castle.

In reward for his services, in August 1316, he was granted the marriage of the king's ward Joan de Verdun, daughter and heiress of Theobald de Verdun, whom he married-off the following year to his younger son, John Montagu (d. August 1317).

In November 1316, he was appointed Steward of the Household to King Edward II, a position which was accompanied by the grant, on 13 January 1317, of an annuity of 200 marks which he received until June 1317, when in lieu of the annuity the king granted him for life, as "King's Bachelor", several manors, including Gravesend in Kent and Kingsbury in Somerset.

On 26 September 1317, the King granted him licence to crenellate his mansion house at Cassington in Oxfordshire. He was summoned by writ to Parliament on 20 November 1317, where he was one of the majores barones in the king's party.

In August 1318 he was appointed Keeper of Abingdon Abbey. However, on 20 November 1318, Edward II sent him to Gascony as Seneschal, and he was replaced as Steward of the Household by Bartholomew de Badlesmere. According to Gross, "this was almost certainly a concession to Thomas of Lancaster, who had accused Montagu of combining with Roger Damory to plot against his life, a factor which delayed his reconciliation with the King".

== Marriage and children ==
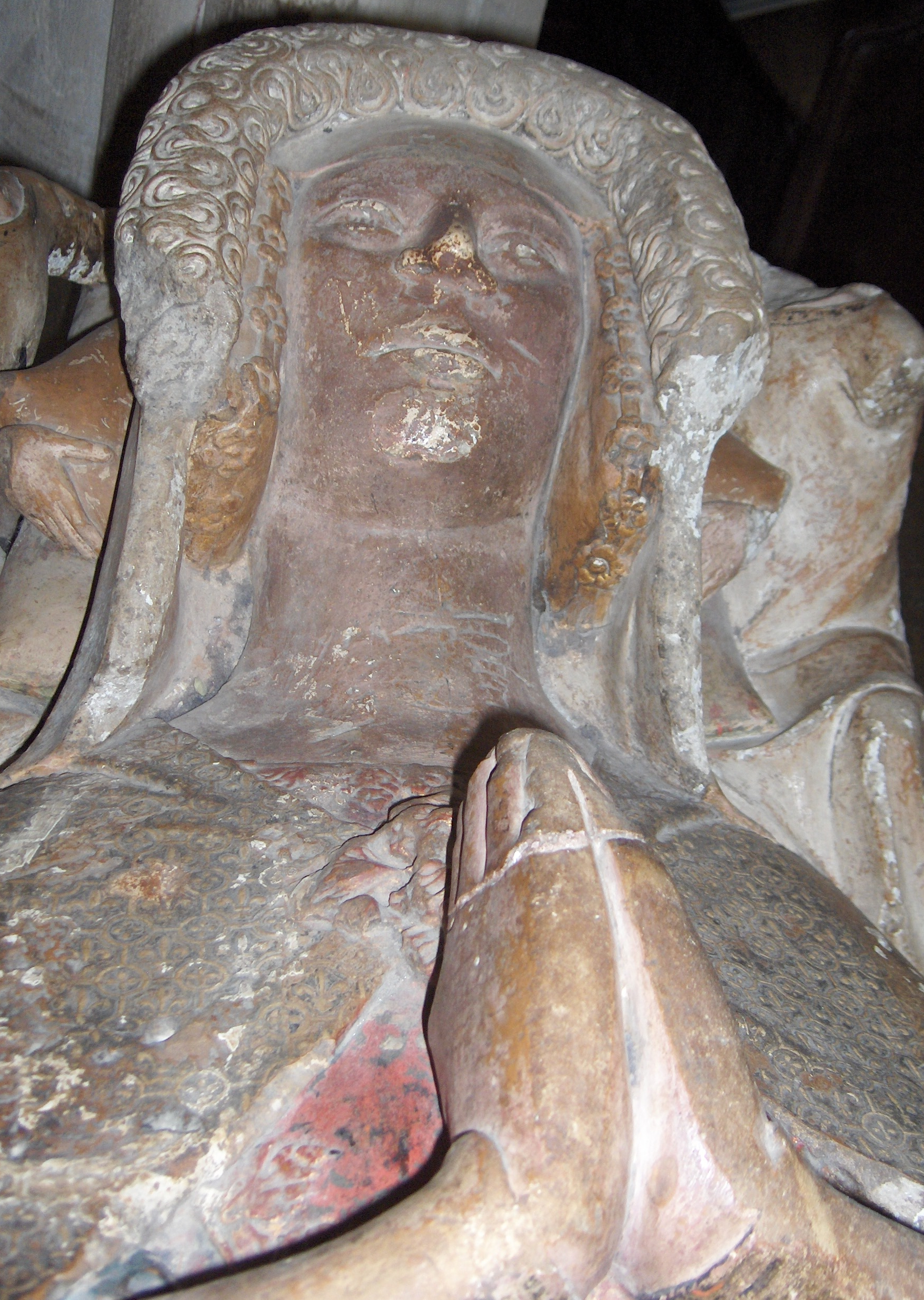
Effigy of Elizabeth de Montfort, wife of William Montagu, in Christ Church Cathedral, Oxford

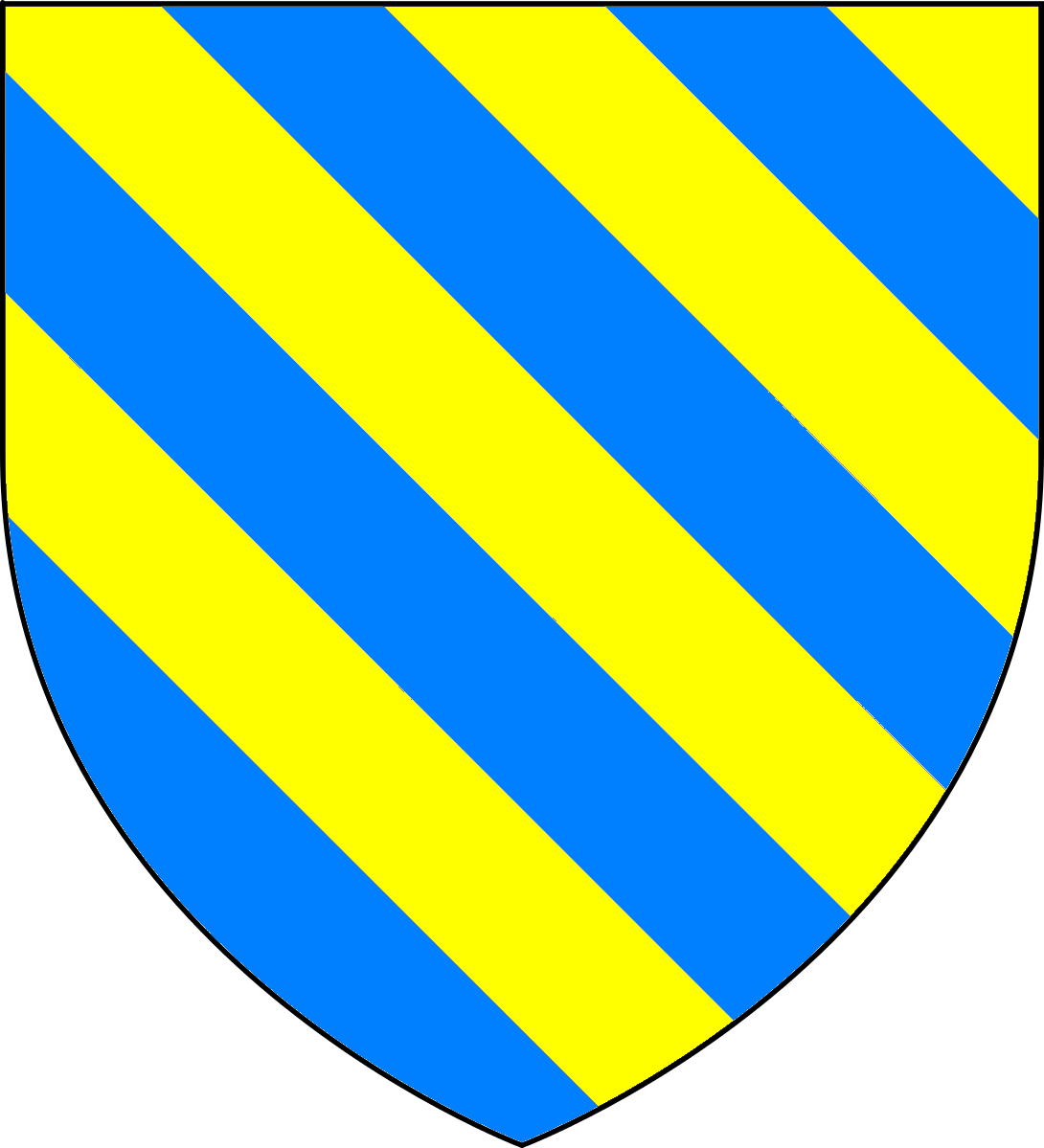
Arms of de Montfort: Bendy of eight or and azure, as shown for Peter de Montfort in the Dering Roll (1270/80)

In about 1292 he married Elizabeth de Montfort (died August 1354), daughter of Peter de Montfort (died before 4 March 1287) (son of Peter de Montfort of Beaudesert Castle by Alice Audley) by his wife Maud de la Mare, daughter and heiress of Sir Henry de la Mare (died 1257), of Ashtead, Surrey, Hinton (in Hurst), Diddenham (in Shinfield), Farley Hill, and Sheepbridge (in Swallowfield), Berkshire, Justice and Seneschal to William Longespée, 2nd Earl of Salisbury, by his wife Joan Neville (daughter of Sir John Neville of Essex by his wife Hawise de Courtenay, daughter of Robert de Courtenay (died 1242), feudal baron of Okehampton in Devon).

Elizabeth de Montfort survived her husband and remarried to Sir Thomas Furnivall (d. before 18 April 1332) of Sheffield, who was pardoned and fined £200 on 8 June 1322 for marrying her, a widow of a tenant-in-chief, without royal licence. Furnivall's son, Thomas Furnivall (d. October 1339), had married Joan de Verdun (d. 2 October 1334), widow of Elizabeth's eldest son, John Montagu. Elizabeth died in August 1354, and was buried in the Priory of St Frideswide, Oxford (now Christ Church Cathedral, Oxford), where her tomb still exists in the Latin chapel.

By his wife Montagu had four sons and seven daughters:

=== Sons ===
- John Montagu (died 1317), eldest son and heir apparent, who predeceased his father. In 1317 in the royal chapel at Windsor Castle he married his father's ward, Joan de Verdun (d. 2 October 1334), daughter and heiress of Theobald de Verdun by Maud Mortimer, daughter of Edmund Mortimer, 2nd Baron Mortimer. The marriage was childless. He died in 1317 having predeceased his father, and was buried at Lincoln Cathedral on 14 August 1317. His widow, Joan de Verdun, remarried, on 24 February 1318, to Sir Thomas Furnivall (d. October 1339), by whom she had three sons and two daughters.
- William Montagu, 1st Earl of Salisbury (1301–1344), eldest surviving son and heir, who succeeded his father as 3rd Baron Montagu, and later became 1st Earl of Salisbury.
- Simon Montacute (died 1345), who was successively Bishop of Worcester and Bishop of Ely.
- Edward Montagu, 1st Baron Montagu (died 14 July 1361), who married twice:
  - Firstly, before 29 August 1338, Alice of Norfolk (died before 30 January 1352), daughter and co-heiress of Thomas of Brotherton, 1st Earl of Norfolk (1300–1338), a younger son of King Edward I, by whom he had a son and four daughters. Alice of Norfolk is said to have died as the result of an assault by her husband and his retainers.
  - Secondly he married a wife named Joan, whose parentage is unknown, by whom he had a son and two daughters.

=== Daughters ===
- Alice Montagu, the eldest daughter, who married, before 27 January 1333, as his first wife, Sir Ralph Daubeney (3 March 1305 – c.1378), by whom she was the mother of Sir Giles Daubeney, 3rd Baron Daubeney (d. 24 June 1386).
- Katherine Montagu, who married Sir William Carrington.
- Mary Montagu, who married Sir Richard Cogan (died 1368), feudal baron of Bampton, in Devon.
- Elizabeth Montagu, Prioress of Holywell Priory.
- Hawise Montagu, who married Sir Roger Bavent (d. 23 April 1355), by whom she had a daughter, Joan Bavent, who married Sir John Dauntsey (died 1391).
- Maud Montagu, Abbess of Barking Abbey from 1341 to 1352.

== Death and burial ==
Montagu died in Gascony on 18 October 1319. His place of burial is unknown. It may be at Bisham Priory.

== Succession ==
Montagu was succeeded by his second son, William Montagu, 1st Earl of Salisbury, who was closely associated with King Edward III, and was created Earl of Salisbury.

== Notes ==
Peerage of England
| Preceded by Simon de Montagu | Baron Montagu; 1316–1319 | Succeeded by William Montagu |
