= Thomas de Lisle =

14th-century Bishop of Ely

- Bishop of Ely
- Elected: 15 July 1345
- Term ended: 23 June 1361
- Predecessor: Simon Montacute
- Successor: Simon Langham

Orders
- Consecration: July 1345

Personal details
- Born: c. 1298
- Died: 23 June 1361
- Denomination: Catholic

Thomas de Lisle (c. 1298–1361) (Latinised to Thomas de Insula ("Thomas from the island") was a medieval Bishop of Ely.

Lisle was elected to Ely on 15 July 1345 and consecrated in July 1345. He had his servants burn down some of the houses belonging to Blanche of Lancaster, a close relative of the King, with whom he had a long-standing quarrel. He was rebuked by Edward III and ordered to pay damages, but after that, he had her servant William Holm murdered in 1355. A court found him guilty of incitement. Edward then confiscated Lisle's possessions and made him beg for forgiveness. Lisle's Period as bishop coincided with the Edwardian War with France, he released priests to accompany the expeditions, however the taxes and demands on the clergy appear to have coincided with poor harvests, in May 1347 in response to the King's demand for wool, the bishop could only offer six sacks of wool.

Lisle died on 23 June 1361.

== Citations ==
Catholic Church titles
Preceded by Simon Montacute	Bishop of Ely; 1345–1361	Succeeded by Simon Langham
