= William Hampton (mayor) =

Member of the Parliament of England

Sir William Hampton
- Born: 138?
- Died: 1480
- Occupation: Fishmonger
- Known for: Lord Mayor of London
- Title: Sir

Sir William Hampton (died 1480) was an English Lord Mayor of London and a member of parliament. He died childless and left his estate to Alice Hampton, vowess and benefactor.

== Life ==
William Hampton was a fishmonger. In 1462 he was a Sheriff of the City of London.

Hampton was knighted for his role as an alderman in defending London against Thomas Neville, the "Bastard of Fauconberg," during his attack of 10–14 May 1471. He had been one of London's four members of parliament in 1461 to 1462, an alderman and he was appointed Lord Mayor of London in September 1472. He had made his money selling fish. From 1454 to 1459 he supplied Henry VI. He had risen to a position where he was not only selling fish but also offering "loans" to Edward IV. The loans were demanded by the king: each of the aldermen gave £10 and the mayor was required to make a contribution of £30. He married twice, but died childless. His money was left to his niece Alice Hampton who became a vowess and benefactor. He was buried at the now lost parish church of St Christopher-le-Stocks.
