= Alice Hampton =

- Born: 14??
- Died: 1516
- Occupation: vowess
- Known for: only single vowess
- Relatives: Sir William Hampton (uncle)

Alice Hampton (14?? – 1516) was a rich English vowess and benefactor. She is considered to be the only vowess who was not married. She became rich when her uncle, William Hampton, died.

== Life ==
Hampton was born in Minchinhampton to Ellen and John Hampton. She was one of eight children and thought to be the eldest daughter. Four of her five brothers died young and the remaining brother became a monk. This made her the heir of both her childless uncle and her father.

In 1483 she was at the Dominican Dartford Priory when her uncle died. Sir William Hampton had been knighted for his role in defending London against the "Bastard of Fauconberg". He had been a member of Parliament and was Lord Mayor of London. He had made his money selling fish and had risen to a position where he was offering loans to Edward IV of England. Alice was unusual in being the only unmarried vowess known. It is surmised that she decided to be a vowess rather than a nun when she realised that she had become wealthy. A vowess was usually a widow or a woman who had with her husband's consent taken a vow of chastity. Vowesses devoted their life to religion and they were subject to only church law.

In the following year she was living in an oratory near the priory when she became so ill from fasting that a letter was sent to the Pope to release her from her commitments to fast. It was agreed on 14 October 1484 that she would be given the privilege of her own confessor who could allow her fasts to be replaced by alternative commitments. In addition she was allowed to take mass in the oratory. She now had considerable autonomy and an income of £15 per year as part of an annuity granted as part of her inheritance.

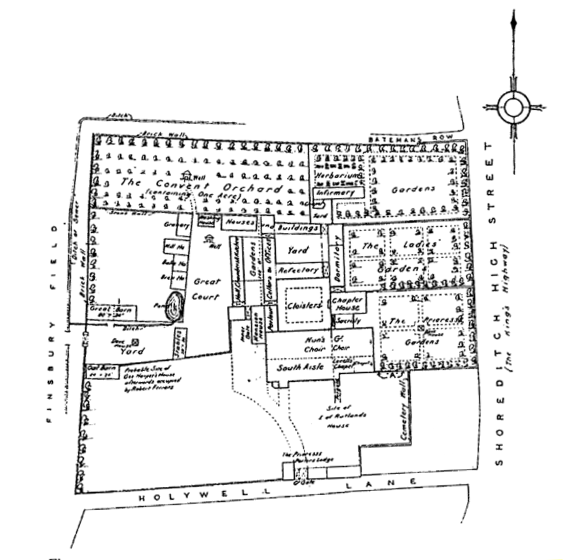
A 1544 map showing the details of the agreement between Alice and the Prioress concerning her use of the Priory

She had inherited not only her uncle's riches but also his influence. By 1492 she was living in London's suburbs at the Augustinian Holywell Priory in Shoreditch where she paid the prioress, Elizabeth Prudde, four pounds of pepper a year. In exchange for this she was allowed to use her well and washing facilities and to make changes to the building's structures. She arranged for her living area to have a view of the church altar and for a locked entrance to her garden. She had her own exit and a dedicated pew in the Lady Chapel; however she lived in two rooms that were just over 18 feet by ten feet.
