= Thomas de Furnivall, 1st Baron Furnivall =

Coat of arms of Thomas de Furnivall, Argent, a bend between six martlets 3 and 3 gules.

Thomas de Furnivall, 1st Baron Furnivall (died 1332), Lord of Sheffield was an English noble. He served in the wars in France and Scotland and was a signatory of the Baron's Letter to Pope Boniface VIII in 1301.

== Biography ==
Thomas was a son of Gerald de Furnivall and Maud FitzJohn. He served in the wars in France and Scotland and was a signatory of the Baron's Letter to Pope Boniface VIII in 1301.

He died in 1332 and was succeeded by his son Thomas.

== Marriage and issue ==
Thomas married Joan, daughter of Hugh le Despenser and Aliva Bassett, they had the following issue:

- Thomas de Furnivall, married Joane de Verdun, had issue.
- Maud de Furnivall, who married firstly John Marmion and secondly Roger la Zouche.
- Katherine de Furnivall, who married William de Thwenge.
- Eleanor de Furnivall, who married Peter de Mauley, had issue.
- Aline de Furnivall.

He married secondly, married Elizabeth, widow of William de Montagu, she was the daughter of Peter de Montfort and Maud de la Mare, they had no issue.
