= Simon Montagu, 1st Baron Montagu =

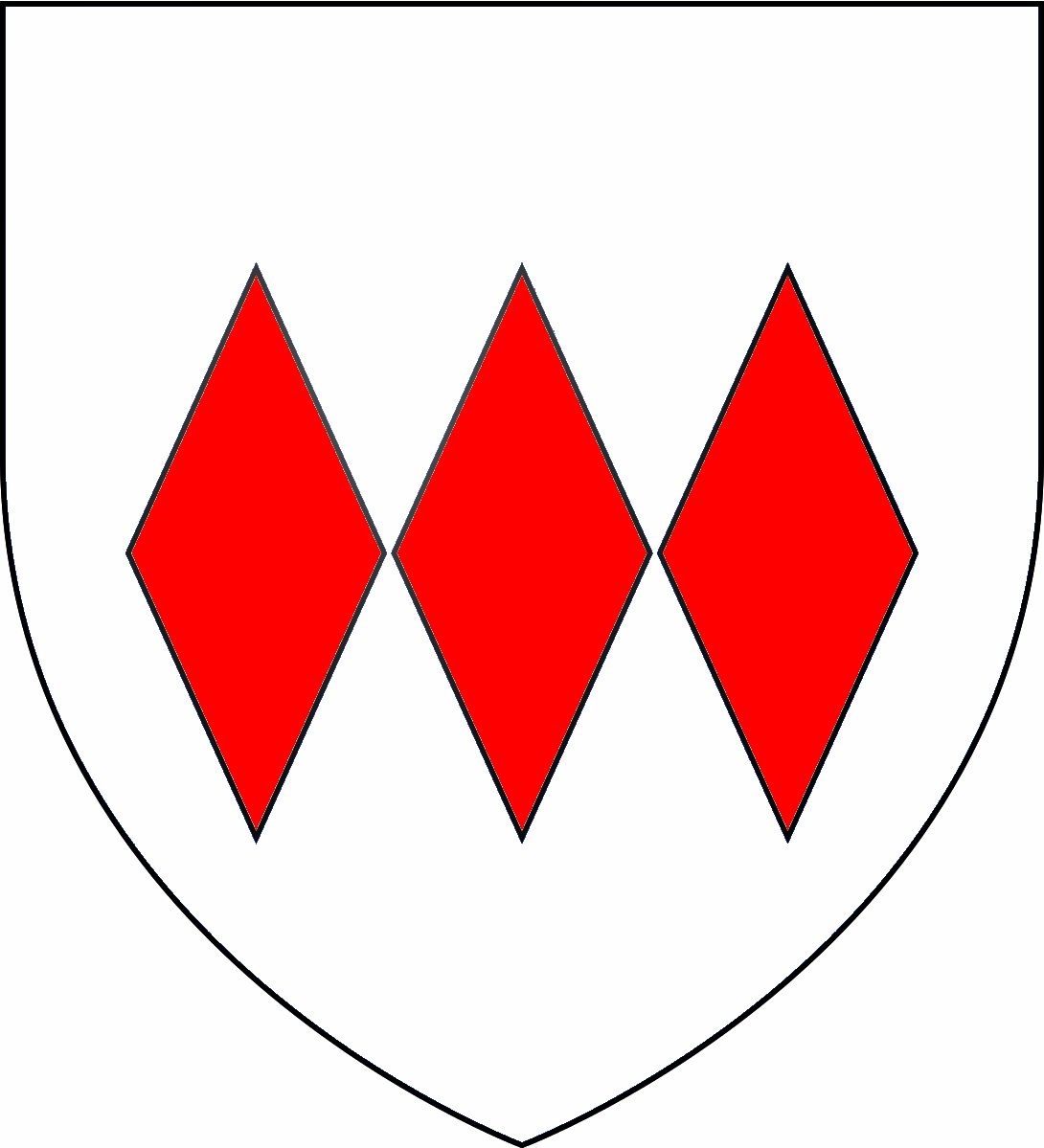
Arms of Montagu: Argent, three fusils conjoined in fess gules

Simon de Montagu, 1st Baron Montagu (died 1316) (alias de Montagu, de Montacute, Latinized to de Monte Acuto ("from the sharp mountain"), from the French mont aigu, with identical meaning,) was summoned to Parliament by writ and thereby became the 1st Baron Montagu. He was the ancestor of the Montagu family, Earls of Salisbury.

== Origins ==
His family originated in Normandy, at the manor of Montaigu-les-Bois, in the arrondissement of Coutances, which remained in the possession of the family until the death of Sebastien de Montaigu in 1715, without children. Two persons named Montagu or similar appear in the Domesday Book of 1086: Ansger and Drogo de Montaigu, both richly endowed with lands, but Ansger died leaving no heir. Drogo's lands were in Somerset, where two of the manors he held in 1086, namely Sutton Montagu and Shipton Montagu, his seat, still retain his name. According to the Duchess of Cleveland (1889): "He had come to England in the train of the Earl of Mortain, and received from him large grants of lands, with the custody of the castle, built either by the Earl or his son William, in the manor of Bishopston, and styled, from its position on a sharp-topped hill, Monte Acuto". (This latter statement seems to forget that the family name derived from the manor of Montaigu-les-Bois in Normandy, not from the shape of the supposed hill in Bishopston, England) In 1211 Drogo's grandson Drogo II de Montagu certified that he held ten and a half knight's fees in the Western counties.

== Life ==
He was son of William de Montacute and Bertha, his wife. Simon first appears during King Edward I of England's great campaign in 1277 against Llywelyn ap Gruffudd in Wales. In 1282 he served in a similar campaign in Wales, when Edward finally crushed Llywelyn, and during the autumn attended the king at Rhuddlan. Simon was summoned to the parliament which met on 30 September 1283 at Shrewsbury for the trial of Llywelyn's brother, Dafydd ap Gruffydd. In 1290 he was apparently confirmed in the possession of Shipton Montacute, Somerset and received additional grants in Dorset Devonshire, Buckinghamshire, and Oxfordshire. On 14 June 1294, he was summoned to meet the king at Portsmouth on 1 September and accompany him to Gascony, but his services were apparently for the time dispensed with. In 1296, however, he was in command of a vessel, and by his bravery broke through the French fleet blockading Bordeaux and revictualled the town, which caused the siege to be raised. Simon remained in Gascony until 1297.

In March 1298 a truce was made with France, and in May, he was summoned as a baron to an assembly of the lay estates at York; on 26 September he was summoned to serve in the war with Scotland, and again in August and December 1299. In 1299 he was made governor of Corfe Castle, Dorset. He attended parliament over the next two years and served in the Scottish war. He was a signatory in 1301 of the Barons' Letter, as 'Simon dominus de Monte Acuto'. In 1304 Aufrica de Connoght, as an alleged heiress of the Magnús Óláfsson, King of Mann and the Isles, quitclaimed these claimed rights to Simon.

In 1306, for his services in Scotland and elsewhere, he was pardoned a debt of 120/. which his father had owed to the exchequer. On 5 April he was asked for an aid on the occasion of the knighting of Prince Edward, at which he was present, and was serving in the Scottish wars until Edward's death on 7 July 1307. He was summoned to attend parliament at the coronation of King Edward II of England and in 1308 was made governor of Beaumaris Castle, Anglesey. Simon served in 1308–1309 against the Scots, and was also appointed justice to try persons guilty of forestalling in London. In 1310 he was constituted Admiral of the Fleet employed against the Scots; and from 1313 was in constant attendance in parliament and in the Scottish war. Simon sought to seize control of the Mann, and in so doing incurred the wrath of Edward II, who pardoned Simon for his actions against the island in 1313. He was stationed in the north to watch the Scottish frontier during the winter campaign of 1315–16, and was summoned to the parliament of Lincoln in January 1316. He died in 1316. His final resting place is Bisham Priory.

== Marriages and children ==
Montagu married twice: firstly to Hawise de St Amand (died 1287), daughter of Amaury de St Amand; and secondly to Isabel, whose parentage is unknown.

He had three sons, by which wife is unknown. His eldest son and heir was William Montagu, 2nd Baron Montagu (c. 1285 – 18 October 1319). His other sons were named John and Simon.

== Sources ==
- Duchess of Cleveland, The Battle Abbey Roll with some Account of the Norman Lineages, 3 volumes, London, 1889
- This article incorporates text from a publication now in the public domain: "Montacute, Simon de". Dictionary of National Biography. London: Smith, Elder & Co. 1885–1900.

Peerage of England
New title	Baron Montagu; 1299–1316	Succeeded by William de Montagu
