= William Montagu, 1st Earl of Salisbury =

English nobleman (1301–1344)

William I of Mann
- Earl of Salisbury; King of Mann
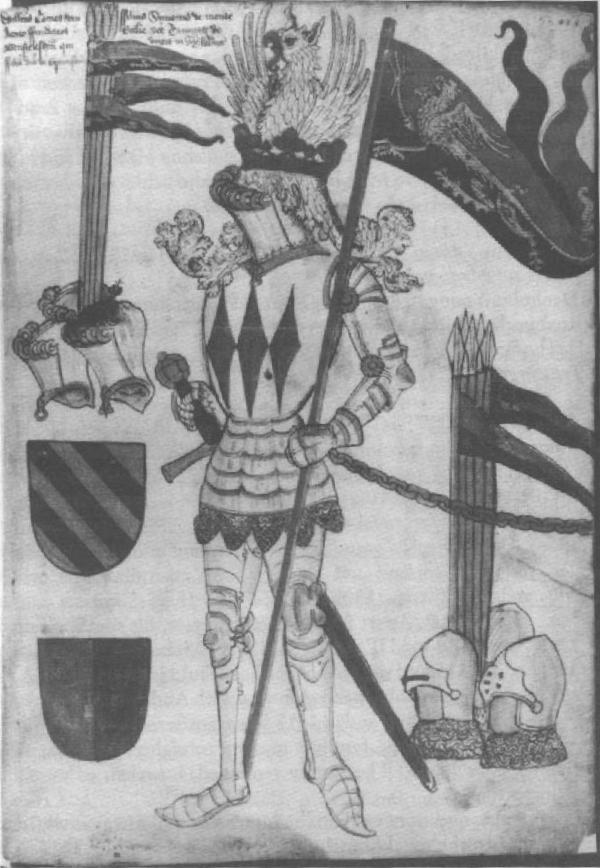
- William Montagu from the Salisbury Roll, c. 1463. He displays the Montagu arms (modern) Argent, three fusils conjoined in fess gules on his breastplate, whilst his maternal arms of de Montfort (Bendy of eight or and azure) are shown on a shield at left.

King of Mann
- Reign: 9 August 1333 – 30 January 1344
- Predecessor: Monarchy established
- Successor: William II
- Born: 1301; Cassington, Oxfordshire
- Died: 30 January 1344; Windsor, Berkshire
- Burial: Bisham Abbey, Berkshire
- Spouse: Catherine Grandison
- Issue: William II of Mann; John Montagu, 1st Baron Montagu; 4 daughters
- Father: William Montagu, 2nd Baron Montagu
- Mother: Elizabeth de Montfort

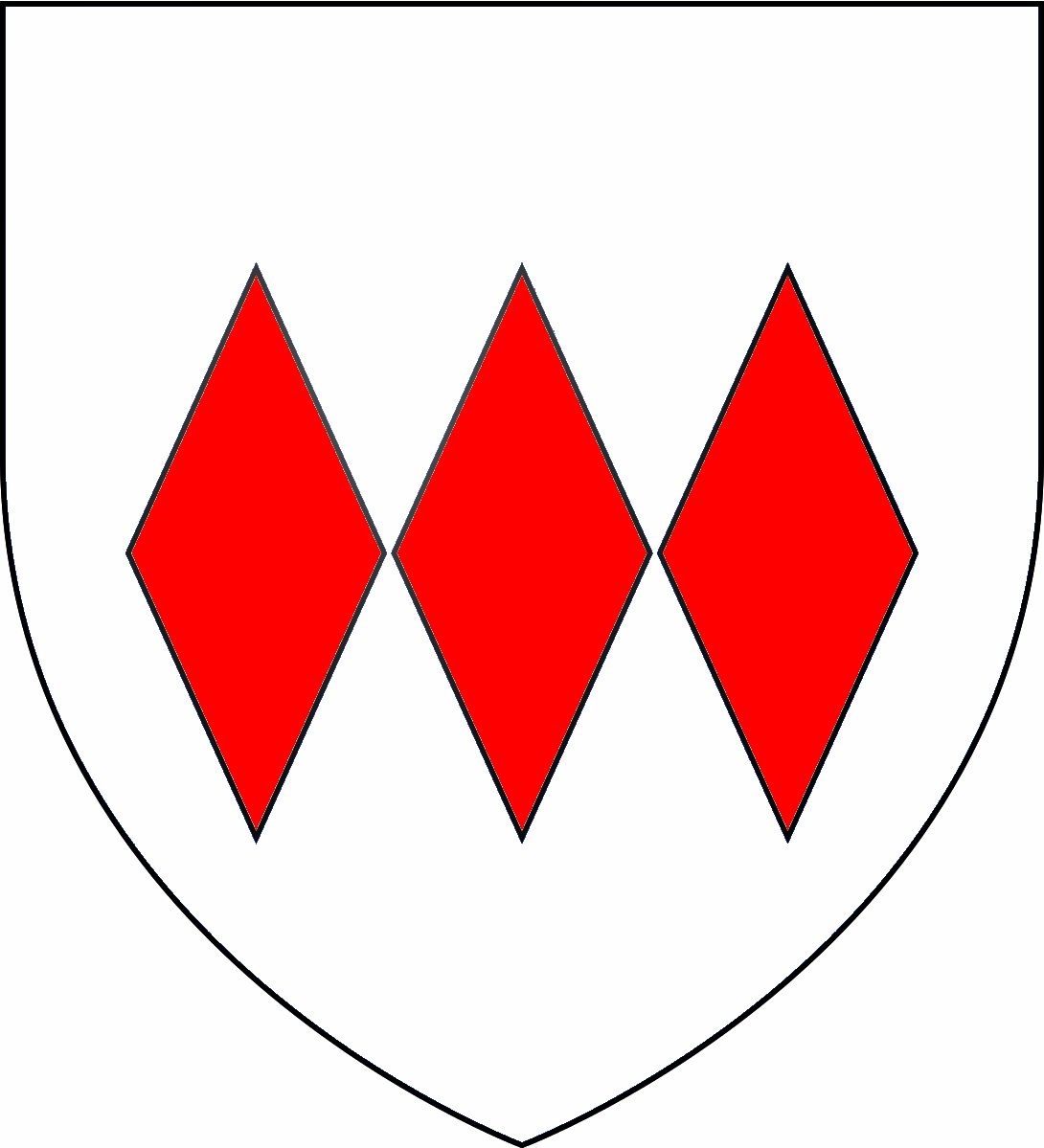
Arms of Montagu (modern): Argent, three fusils conjoined in fess gules

William Montagu, alias de Montacute, 1st Earl of Salisbury, 3rd Baron Montagu, King of Man (1301 – 30 January 1344) was an English nobleman and loyal servant of King Edward III.

He was the first king of an independent Manx Kingdom.

The son of William Montagu, 2nd Baron Montagu, he entered the royal household at an early age and became a close companion of the young Prince Edward. The relationship continued after Edward was crowned king following the deposition of Edward II in 1327. In 1330, Montagu was one of Edward's main accomplices in the coup against Roger Mortimer, who until then had been acting as the king's protector.

In the following years, Montagu served the king in various capacities, primarily in the Scottish Wars. He was richly rewarded, and among other things received the lordship of the Isle of Man. In 1337, he was created Earl of Salisbury, and given an annual income of 1,000 marks to go with the title. He served on the Continent in the early years of the Hundred Years' War, but in 1340 he was captured by the French, and in return for his freedom had to promise never to fight in France again. Salisbury died of wounds suffered at a tournament early in 1344.

Legend has it that Montagu's wife Catherine was raped by Edward III, but this story is almost certainly French propaganda. William and Catherine had six children, most of whom married into the nobility. Modern historians have called William Montague Edward's "most intimate personal friend" and "the chief influence behind the throne from Mortimer's downfall in 1330 until his own death in 1344."

== Family background ==
William Montagu, born at Cassington, Oxfordshire in 1301, was the second but eldest surviving son of William Montagu, 2nd Baron Montagu, and Elizabeth de Montfort, daughter of Sir Peter Montfort of Beaudesert, Warwickshire, by Matilda/Maud de la Mare, daughter and heiress of Henry de la Mare of Ashtead, Surrey, Royal Justice, Seneschal of William Longspree II, Earl of Salisbury.

The Montagu family, a West Country family with roots going back to the Conquest, held extensive lands in Somerset, Dorset and Devon.

The father, William Montagu, distinguished himself in the Scottish Wars during the reign of Edward I, and served as steward of Edward II's household. Some members of the nobility, including Thomas of Lancaster, viewed Montagu with suspicion, as a member of a court party with undue influence on the king. For this reason, he was sent to Aquitaine, to serve as seneschal. Here he died on 18 October 1319. Even though he sat in parliament as a baron, the second lord Montagu never rose above a level of purely regional importance.

== Early service ==
The younger William was still a minor at the time of his father's death, and entered the royal household as a ward of the king in 1320. On 21 February 1323 he was granted his father's lands and title. His service to Edward II took him abroad to the Continent in both 1320 and 1325. In 1326 he was knighted. After the deposition of Edward II in 1327, Montagu continued in the service of Edward's son Edward III. He helped the new king in repelling the Scottish invasion of 1327, and was created knight banneret in 1328.

Montagu enjoyed a close relationship with Edward III, and accompanied him abroad on a diplomatic mission in 1329. That same year he was sent on an embassy to negotiate a marriage alliance with King Philip VI of France. His most important task, however, came in connection with a mission to the Papacy in Avignon. The young king—along with his government—was under the dominance of his mother Isabella and her lover Roger Mortimer, who had been responsible for the deposition of the king's father. Montagu explained the king's situation, and Pope John XXII asked for a special signal that assure him that he was dealing with the king in person. After Montagu's return, Richard Bury, Keeper of the Privy Seal, wrote to inform the pope that only letters containing the words pater sancte (holy father), in Edward's own handwriting, were indeed from the king. Only Edward, Bury and Montagu were party to the scheme.

== Coup against Mortimer ==
When Mortimer discovered the conspiracy against him, Montagu was brought in for interrogation—along with the king—but gave nothing away. Afterward he supposedly advised Edward to move against his protector, because "It was better that they should eat the dog than that the dog should eat them". On 19 October 1330, while Mortimer and Isabella were entrenched in Nottingham Castle, the constable of the castle showed Montagu a secret entrance through a tunnel. Along with William de Bohun, Robert Ufford, and John Neville and others, he entered the castle, where he met up with the king. A short brawl followed before Mortimer was captured. The queen stormed into the chamber shouting "Good son, have pity on noble Mortimer". Edward did not obey his mother's wishes, and a few weeks later Mortimer was executed for treason in London. As a reward for his part in the coup, Montagu was given lands worth £1,000, including the Welsh lordship of Denbigh that had belonged to Mortimer. His family also benefited; his brother Simon Montacute became Bishop of Worcester and later of Ely. Another brother, Edward Montagu, 1st Baron Montagu, married Alice of Norfolk, a co-heir of Thomas of Brotherton, 1st Earl of Norfolk.

== Service under Edward III ==
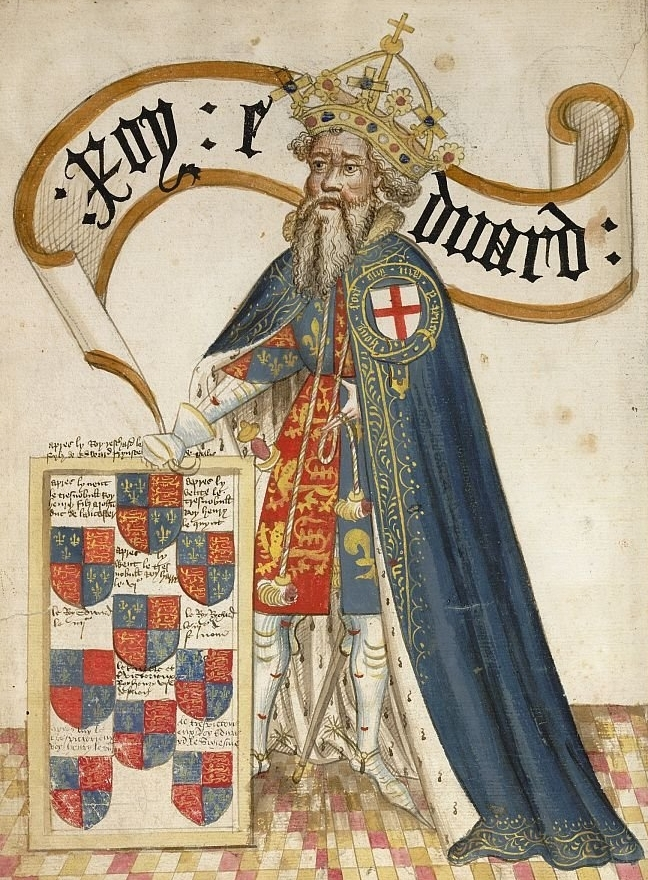
Edward III founded the Order of the Garter in 1348, and included Salisbury's son among the founding members.

In the years to come, Montagu acted as Edward's closest companion. In April 1331, the two went on a secret expedition to France, disguised as merchants so they would not be recognised. In September of the same year, Montagu held a tournament at Cheapside, where he and the king were costumed as Tartars. From 1333 onwards, Montagu was deeply engaged in the Scottish Wars, and distinguished himself at the Siege of Berwick and the Battle of Halidon Hill. It was after this event that his lordship over the Isle of Man was recognised, a right he held from his grandfather. The lordship was at the moment of a purely theoretical nature, however, since the island was still under Scottish control.

In February 1334 Montagu was sent on a commission to Edinburgh, to demand Edward Balliol's homage to Edward. In the great summer campaign of 1335, it was Montagu who provided the largest English contingent, with 180 men-at-arms and 136 archers. He was well rewarded for his contributions: after Edward Balliol ceded the Lowlands, Montagu was granted the county of Peeblesshire. He was also allowed to buy the wardship of Roger Mortimer's son Roger for 1,000 marks, a deal that turned out to be very lucrative for Montagu. At this point, however, the fortunes were turning for the English in Scotland. Montagu campaigned in the north again in 1337, but the Siege of Dunbar in 1338 against Agnes, Countess of Dunbar and Alexander Ramsay of Dalhousie met with failure. Following the abortive attempt in Scotland, Edward III turned his attention to the continent.

== The Hundred Years' War ==
Montagu was created Earl of Salisbury on 16 March 1337. This was one of six comital promotions Edward III made that day, in preparation for what was to become the Hundred Years' War. To allow Montagu to support his new status, the king granted him land and rent of a value of 1,000 marks a year. The money was provided from the royal stannaries of Cornwall. A contemporary poem tells of a vow made by the earl on the eve of the wars—he would not open one of his eyes while fighting in France. The story is probably a satire; the truth was that Montagu had already lost the use of one of his eyes in a tournament.

In April 1337, Montagu was appointed to a diplomatic commission to Valenciennes, to establish alliances with Flanders and the German princes. In July 1338, he accompanied the king on another mission to the continent, again providing the greatest number of soldiers, with 123 men-at-arms and 50 archers. In September of that year he was made Marshal of England. After the death of Thomas of Brotherton, Earl of Norfolk, this office had come into the hands of Norfolk's daughter Margaret. The king did not trust the office with her husband, so he decided instead to bestow it on his trusted companion, Montagu. Edward's policy of building alliances put him in great debt, and when he left the Low Countries to return to England late in 1338, Salisbury had to stay behind as surety to the king's debtors, along with the king's family and the Earl of Derby. The earl had earlier voiced concerns about the costly alliances, but he nevertheless remained loyal to the king's strategy.

While Edward was away, Salisbury was captured by the French at Lille in April 1340, and imprisoned in Paris. Reportedly, King Philip VI of France wanted to execute Salisbury and Robert Ufford, Earl of Suffolk, who was captured with him. Philip was, however, dissuaded by John of Bohemia, who argued that the earls could come in handy in an exchange, should any French noblemen be captured. Though released on parole in September, it was not until May 1342 that he reached a final settlement with the French. Salisbury was freed in a prisoner exchange, but only on the condition that he never fight in France again.

== Final years ==
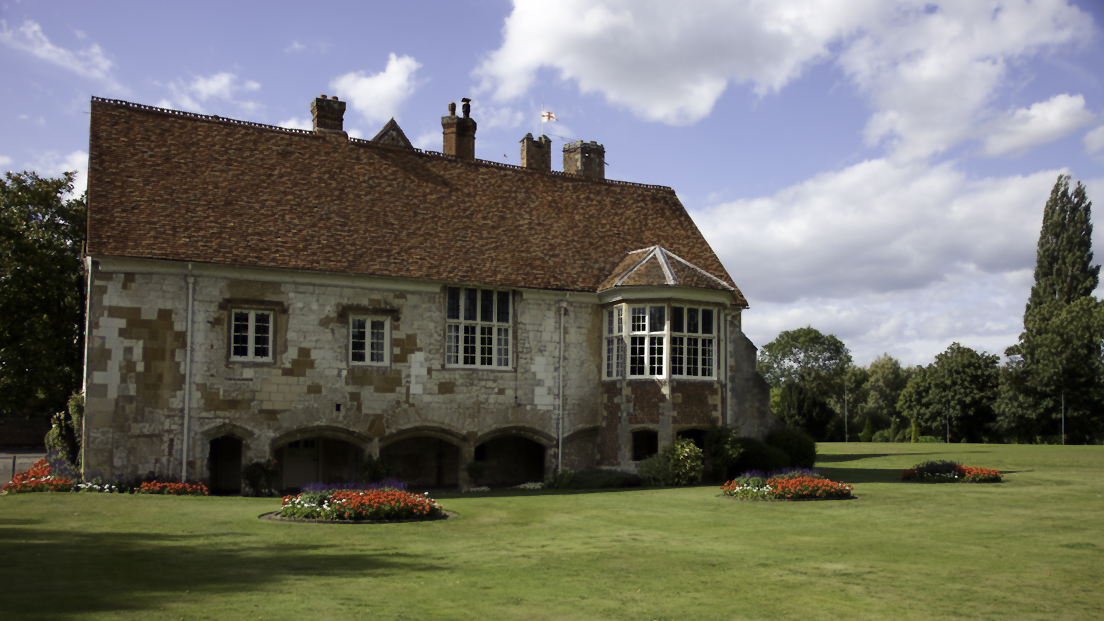
Salisbury's residence of Bisham Manor in Berkshire.

Salisbury had long been frustrated by the failure of the government in England to provide sufficient funds for the war effort. On his return, however, he played little part in the conflict of 1341 between King Edward and Chancellor John Stratford. In May of that year, he was appointed to a committee to hear the king's charges against Stratford, but little came from this. In the same month of May 1341, he had conquered the Isle of Mann from the Scots and was crowned King there. In 1342–43 he fought with Robert of Artois in the Breton War of Succession, and in 1343 helped negotiate the Truce of Malestroit.

His final international commission took place late in 1343, when he accompanied Henry of Grosmont, Earl of Derby, on a diplomatic mission to Castile. Early in 1344 he was back in England, where he took part in a great tournament at Windsor. It was during this tournament, according to the chronicler Adam Murimuth, that he received wounds that would prove fatal. Salisbury died on 30 January 1344. He was buried at Bisham Priory in Berkshire, adjoining his home, Bisham Manor. He had founded the priory himself in 1337, on his elevation to the earldom. King Edward's financial obligations were never paid in full during the earl's lifetime, and at Salisbury's death, the king owed him £11,720. Of this, some £6,374 were written off by his executors in 1346.

== Family ==
In or before 1327 Salisbury married Catherine, daughter of William de Grandison, 1st Baron Grandison. Two anecdotal stories revolve around Catherine Montagu; in one she is identified as the "Countess of Salisbury" from whose dropped garter Edward III named the Order of the Garter. In the other, Edward III falls in love with the countess, and arranges to be alone with her so he can rape her. Neither story is supported by contemporary evidence, and the latter almost certainly is a product of French propaganda.

William and Catherine had six children, most of whom made highly fortunate matches with other members of the nobility. The first Earl of Salisbury made enormous additions to the family fortune; at the time of his father's death, the lands had been valued at just over £300. In 1344, only the annual income of the lands has been estimated to more than £2,300, equivalent to about £2.46 million in present-day terms. Edward was also free with granting franchises to Salisbury, including the return of writs, which gave the earl authority in his lands normally held by the royally appointed sheriff. Salisbury's oldest son William succeeded his father in July 1349, while still a minor, as William Montagu, 2nd Earl of Salisbury. The younger William was one of the founding members of the Order of the Garter, but he never enjoyed the same favour with the king as his father had.

The children of William and Catherine were as follows:

- Elizabeth Montagu, died 1359, married first, Giles de Badlesmere, 2nd Baron Badlesmere, second, Hugh le Despencer, Baron le Despencer (1338) before 27 April 1341, and third, Guy de Bryan, 1st Baron Bryan, after 1349.
- William Montacute, 2nd Earl of Salisbury, born 1328, died 1397, succeeded his father on 11 June 1349.
- Sibyl Montagu, married Sir Edmund FitzAlan, Knt., eldest son of Richard FitzAlan, 10th Earl of Arundel.
- John de Montacute, 1st Baron Montacute, born 1330, died 1390, father of John Montacute, 3rd Earl of Salisbury.
- Philippa Montagu, born 1332, died 1381, married Roger Mortimer, 2nd Earl of March.
- Agnes Montagu, contracted to marry John, eldest son of Roger Grey, 1st Baron Grey de Ruthyn.

== In fiction ==
Salisbury is a character in Les Rois maudits (The Accursed Kings), a series of French historical novels by Maurice Druon. He was portrayed by Serge Maillat in the 1972 French miniseries adaptation of the series.

Peerage of England
Vacant Title last held by Alice de Lacy	Earl of Salisbury; 1337–1344	Succeeded by William Montacute
Preceded by William Montacute	Baron Montacute; 1319–1344	Succeeded by William Montacute
