= Return of writs =

The privilege of return of writs, in medieval England, was a right given to certain liberties or franchises to execute royal writs within the land in question. This in effect meant overpassing the authority normally held by the sheriff as the king's representative in the localities. Examples of such liberties in medieval England include the palatine counties (see county palatine) County Durham, Cheshire and the Duchy of Lancaster.
