= Alice of Norfolk =

English noblewoman

- Born: c. 1324
- Died: c. 30 January 1352 (aged 27–28); Bungay, Suffolk, England
- Spouse: Edward Montagu, 1st Baron Montagu
- Issue: Elizabeth Montagu; Maud Montagu; Joan Montagu
- House: Plantagenet
- Father: Thomas of Brotherton
- Mother: Alice de Hales

Alice of Norfolk or Alice of Brotherton (c. 1324 – c. 30 January 1352) was an English noblewoman. She was the daughter of Thomas of Brotherton, and a granddaughter of King Edward I of England. She married Edward Montagu, 1st Baron Montagu.

== Life ==
Alice of Norfolk, likely born about 1324, was the daughter of Thomas of Brotherton, eldest son of King Edward I by his second marriage to Margaret of France (1279?–1318), the daughter of King Philippe III of France (d.1285). Her mother was Alice de Hales (d. in or before 1330), daughter of Sir Roger de Hales of Hales Hall in Loddon in Roughton, Norfolk, by his wife Alice Skogan. She had an elder brother, Edward of Norfolk, and an elder sister, Margaret, Duchess of Norfolk.

Alice's father died in August 1338. His only son, Edward of Norfolk, having predeceased him, Alice and her elder sister Margaret were their father's heirs. In March 1339, King Edward III ordered William Trussell, escheator, to deliver to Alice and her husband, Edward Montagu, her share of her father's lands.

Alice's husband fought at the Battle of Crecy in 1346, and was summoned to Parliament from 20 November 1348 to 20 November 1360 by writs directed Edwardo de Monte Acuto, "whereby he is held to have become Lord Montagu".

Alice of Norfolk died at Bungay, Suffolk, shortly before 30 January 1352, as the result of an assault by her husband, for which crime he and some of his retainers were indicted. In 1361, one William Dunche of Bungay was pardoned for his part in her death, as well as other felonies.

Her heirs were her surviving daughters, Elizabeth, Maud and Joan. At her death, the marriages of two of her daughters were found to belong to the King, and these two daughters were sent to live with Alice's mother-in-law, Elizabeth (née Montfort), who after the death of her first husband, William Montagu, 2nd Baron Montagu, had married Thomas Furnivall, 1st Baron Furnivall (d. before 18 April 1332).

Alice's husband remarried. By his second wife, Joan, whose surname is unknown, he had a son, Edward (d. 4 October 1361), and two daughters, Elizabeth Montagu (d. before 29 November 1361), who married Sir John de Brewes (d. 3 February 1367), and Audrey Montagu, who married Sir Hugh de Strelley (d. before 16 October 1390).

Edward Montagu died 14 July 1361, his only son and heir by Alice having predeceased him. His heir was his seven-week-old son by his second marriage, Edward Montagu, who survived him by only three months. At his death on 4 October 1361 any barony created by writ fell into abeyance, according to modern doctrine, among the surviving daughters of his father.

Montagu's arms were Argent, three lozenges in fess, on each an eagle displayed with a label of three points.

== Marriage and issue ==
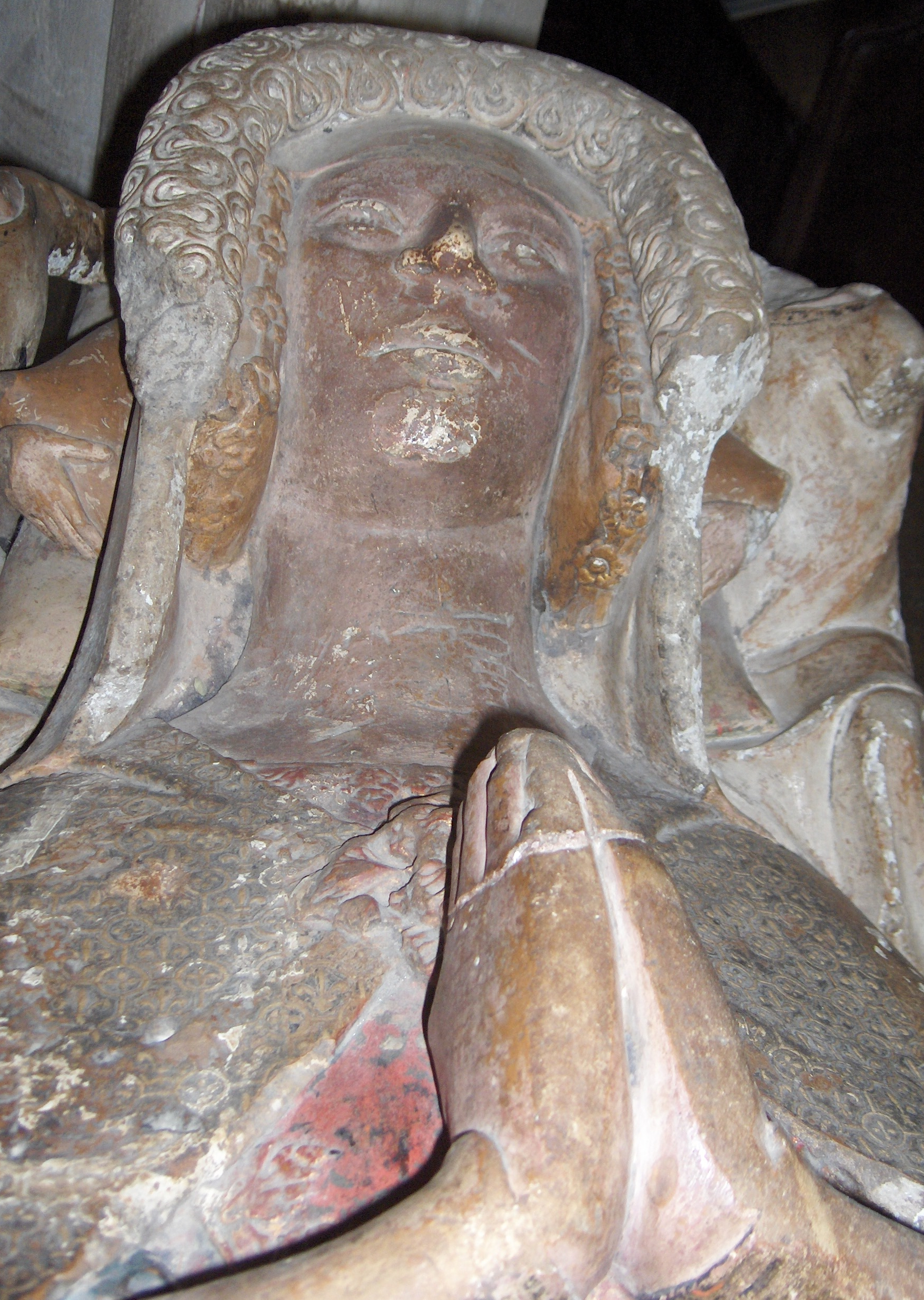
Effigy of Elizabeth Montfort, Alice of Norfolk's mother-in-law, Christ Church Cathedral, Oxford

On 4 February 1333, Thomas of Brotherton contracted Alice in marriage to William Montagu, 2nd Earl of Salisbury (born 20 June 1328), son and heir of William Montagu, 1st Earl of Salisbury, by Katherine Grandison, daughter of William Grandison, 1st Baron Grandison. The marriage contract was later declared void.

Alice married instead, before 29 August 1338, William's uncle, Edward Montagu, 1st Baron Montagu (d. 14 July 1361), youngest son of William Montagu, 2nd Baron Montagu (d. 18 October 1319), by Elizabeth Montfort (d. August 1354), daughter of Sir Piers Montfort of Beaudesert, Warwickshire, by whom she had a son and four daughters:

- Edward Montagu (d. before February 1359), son and heir apparent, who in May 1343 was contracted by his uncle, William Montagu, 1st Earl of Salisbury, to Blanche Mowbray (d. 21 July 1409), daughter of John de Mowbray, 3rd Baron Mowbray, by Joan of Lancaster, daughter of Henry, 3rd Earl of Lancaster.
- Audrey Montagu, who was living in June 1349, but died before February 1359.
- Elizabeth Montagu (c.1344 – before July 1361), who married, before February 1359, Walter Ufford (born 3 October 1333), third son of Robert de Ufford, 1st Earl of Suffolk, and Margaret Norwich, daughter of Sir Walter Norwich (d.1329), Treasurer of the Exchequer, by whom she had no issue.
- Maud Montagu (d. before 5 October 1393), who was elected Abbess of Barking Abbey on 20 April 1377.
- Joan Montagu (2 February 1349 – before 27 June 1376), who married, as his first wife, before 28 October 1362, William de Ufford, 2nd Earl of Suffolk (30 May 1338 – 15 February 1382), by whom she had four sons and a daughter.
