= Edward Montagu, 1st Baron Montagu =

English knight and peer

- Died: 14 July 1361
- Spouses: Alice of Norfolk; Joan (surname unknown)
- Issue: Edward Montagu; Audrey Montagu; Elizabeth Montagu; Maud Montagu; Joan Montagu
- Father: William Montagu, 2nd Baron Montagu
- Mother: Elizabeth Montfort

Edward Montagu (or Edward de Montacute), 1st Baron Montagu (d. 14 July 1361) was an English knight and peer. He fought at the Battle of Crecy. He assaulted his first wife, Alice of Norfolk, who died as a result.

== Life ==
Edward Montagu was the youngest son of William Montagu, 2nd Baron Montagu (d. 18 October 1319), by Elizabeth Montfort (d. August 1354), daughter of Sir Piers Montfort of Beaudesert, Warwickshire. He had three brothers and seven sisters, including William Montagu, 1st Earl of Salisbury, and Simon Montacute, successively Bishop of Worcester and Bishop of Ely (for details concerning his siblings, see the article on his father, William Montagu, 2nd Baron Montagu).

On 19 March 1337, he was granted an annuity of £100 by Edward III for the better support of his knighthood.

His first wife was Alice of Norfolk, daughter of Thomas of Brotherton, and granddaughter of Edward I. In March 1339 the King ordered William Trussell, escheator, to deliver to Montagu and his wife Alice her share of her father's lands.

Montagu fought at the Battle of Crecy in 1346, and was summoned to Parliament from 20 November 1348 to 20 November 1360 by writs directed Edwardo de Monte Acuto, 'whereby he is held to have become Lord Montagu'.

Montagu and his retainers assaulted Alice, causing her death on 30 January 1352. Montagu and some of his followers were indicted for the crime. In 1361, one William Dunche of Bungay was pardoned for his part in her death, as well as other felonies.

Montagu died on 14 July 1361, his only son and heir by Alice having predeceased him. His place of burial is unknown. His heir was his seven-week-old son by his second marriage, Edward Montagu, who survived him by only three months. At his death on 4 October 1361, any barony created by writ fell into abeyance, according to modern doctrine, among the surviving daughters of his father.

His arms were Argent, three lozenges in fess, on each an eagle displayed with a label of three points.

== Marriage and issue ==
Montagu married firstly, before 29 August 1338, Alice of Norfolk, daughter of Thomas of Brotherton, eldest son of Edward I by his second marriage to Margaret (1279?–1318), the daughter of Philippe III of France (d.1285). Her mother was Alice de Hales (d. in or before 1330), daughter of Sir Roger de Hales of Hales Hall in Loddon in Roughton, Norfolk, by his wife, Alice.

By Alice of Norfolk, Montagu had a son and four daughters:

- Edward Montagu (d. before February 1359), son and heir apparent, who in May 1343 was contracted by his uncle, William Montagu, 1st Earl of Salisbury, to Blanche Mowbray (d. 21 July 1409), daughter of John de Mowbray, 3rd Baron Mowbray, by Joan of Lancaster, daughter of Henry, 3rd Earl of Lancaster.
- Audrey Montagu, who was living in June 1349, but died before February 1359.
- Elizabeth Montagu (c.1344 - before July 1361), who married, before February 1359, Walter Ufford (born 3 October 1333), third son of Robert de Ufford, 1st Earl of Suffolk, and Margaret Norwich, daughter of Sir Walter Norwich (d.1329), Treasurer of the Exchequer, by whom she had no issue.
- Maud Montagu (d. before 5 October 1393), who was elected Abbess of Barking Abbey on 20 April 1377.
- Joan Montagu (2 February 1349 - before 27 June 1376), who married, as his first wife, before 28 October 1362, William de Ufford, 2nd Earl of Suffolk (30 May 1338 - 15 February 1382), by whom she had four sons and a daughter.

He married secondly a wife named Joan, whose parentage is unknown, by whom he had a son and two daughters:

- Edward Montagu (d. 4 October 1361).
- Elizabeth Montagu (d. before 29 November 1361), who married Sir John de Brewes (d. 3 February 1367).
- Audrey Montagu, who married Sir Hugh de Strelley (d. before 16 October 1390).
