= Beaudesert Castle =

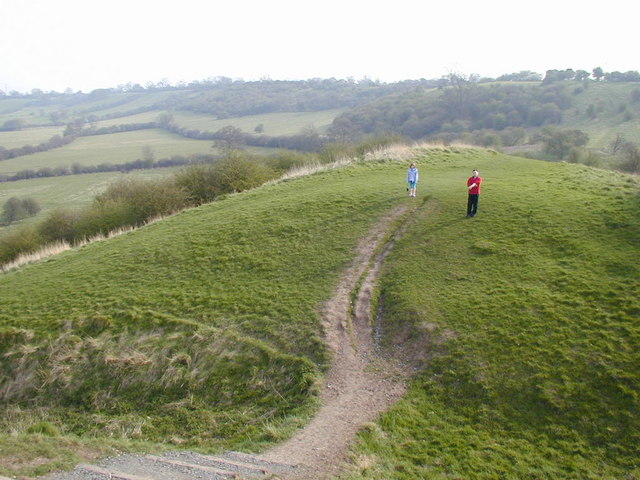

- Location within Warwickshire

General information
- Location: Beaudesert, Warwickshire, England
- Coordinates: 52.292733°N 1.771172°W

Beaudesert Castle was on a high mound overlooking the village of Beaudesert to the east of Henley-in-Arden, Warwickshire (grid reference SP15606613). It is a scheduled monument.

The remains found on the site show that it was originally an Iron Age fort which gave the mount its ancient name, Donnilee. The hilltop and the surrounding area was "sculpted" to form a motte and bailey fortification with its timber Hall following the Norman conquest. It was followed by the construction of a stone castle. According to sources it was Thurston De Montfort who built the stone castle here in 1140 during the reign of Henry II, and it remained the De Montfort seat for more than a hundred years. Peter de Montfort also resided at the castle. The Earl of Warwick took possession of the De Montfort's land in approximately 1369, and subsequently the castle's importance declined. According to some accounts it was repaired in 1411 but later abandoned. During the early years of the War of the Roses, between York and Lancaster, the castle, which was then unoccupied and had fallen into disrepair, was dismantled, and its heavy timbers were, according to some sources, used for the construction of stately houses at Henley. A single stone and earthworks remain today, along with evidence of two fishponds and some remains of the motte and bailey fortification.

The site was investigated by the archaeologists of Time Team in series 9 (2002).

== See also ==
- Castles in Great Britain and Ireland
- List of castles in England
