= Thomas of Brotherton, 1st Earl of Norfolk =

English prince and nobleman (1300–1338)

Thomas of Brotherton
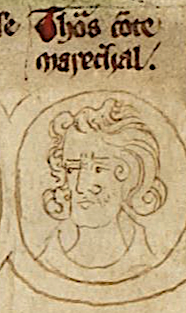
- Thomas depicted on a medieval roll

Earl of Norfolk
- Reign: 1312–1338
- Successor: Margaret, Duchess of Norfolk
- Born: 1 June 1300; Brotherton, Yorkshire
- Died: August/September 1338; Framlingham Castle, Suffolk, England
- Burial: Bury St Edmunds Abbey
- Spouse: Alice de Hales; Mary de Brewes
- Issue: Margaret, Duchess of Norfolk; Edward of Norfolk; Alice of Norfolk
- House: Plantagenet
- Father: Edward I of England
- Mother: Margaret of France

Arms of Thomas of Brotherton, 1st Earl of Norfolk: Royal arms of King Edward I, a label of three points argent for difference

Thomas of Brotherton, 1st Earl of Norfolk (1 June 1300 – August/September 1338), was the fifth son of King Edward I of England (1239–1307), and the eldest child by his second wife, Margaret of France, the daughter of King Philip III of France. He was, therefore, a younger half-brother of King Edward II (reigned 1307–1327) and a full brother of Edmund of Woodstock, 1st Earl of Kent. He occupied the office of Earl Marshal of England.

== Early life ==
Thomas of Brotherton was born 1 June 1300 at the manor house at Brotherton, Yorkshire, son of King Edward I of England and Queen Margaret of France. His mother was on her way to Cawood, where her confinement was scheduled to take place. (Note: He was born in the main house, later demolished in the 1930s due to disrepair, although the new 17th-century wing still exists.) According to Hilton, Margaret was staying at Pontefract Castle and was following a hunt when she went into labour. The chronicler William Rishanger records that during the difficult delivery his mother prayed, as was the custom at the time, to Thomas Becket, and Thomas of Brotherton was thus named after the saint and his place of birth.

King Edward I hastened to the queen and the newborn baby and had Thomas presented with two cradles. His brother Edmund of Woodstock was born in the year after that. They were overseen by wet nurses until they were six years old. Like their parents, they learned to play chess and ride horses. They were visited by nobles and their half-sister Mary of Woodstock, who was a nun. Their mother often accompanied their father on his campaigns to Scotland, but kept herself well-informed on their well-being.

Thomas's father died when he was 7 years old. Thomas's half-brother Edward, became king of England (Edward II) and Thomas was heir presumptive until his nephew, the future King Edward III, was born in 1312. The Earldom of Cornwall had been intended for Thomas, but his brother the King instead bestowed it upon his favourite, Piers Gaveston, in 1306. When Thomas was ten years old, King Edward II assigned to him and his brother Edmund, the estates of Roger Bigod, 5th Earl of Norfolk, who had died without heirs in 1306.

== Career ==
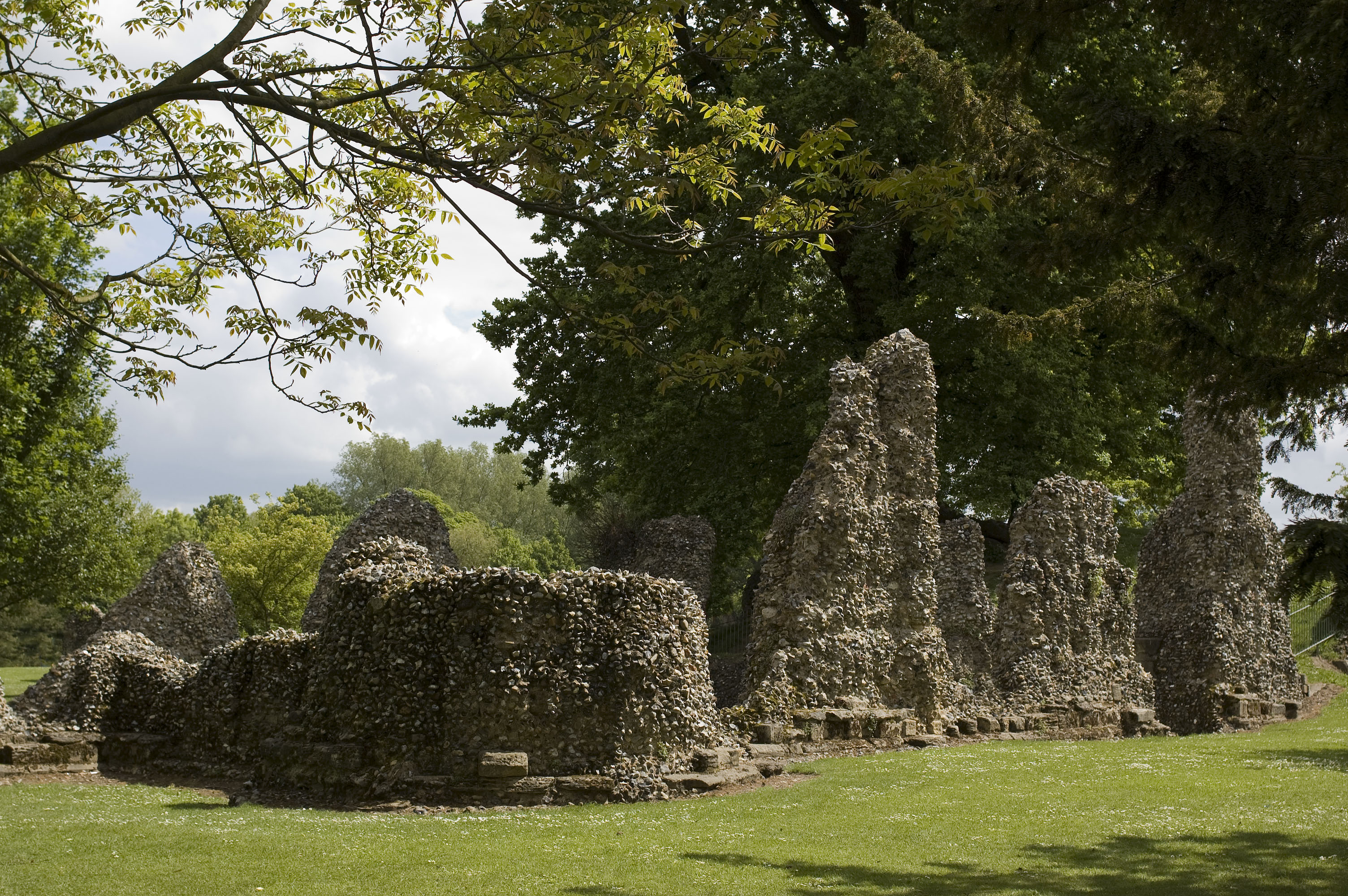
Ruins of the Abbey of Bury St Edmunds where Thomas of Brotherton was buried

In 1312, Thomas was created Earl of Norfolk by Edward II, and on 10 February 1316, he was appointed Earl Marshal. While his brother was away fighting in Scotland, he was left Keeper of England. He was known for his hot and violent temper. He was one of the many victims of the unchecked greed of the king's new favourite, Hugh Despenser the Younger and his father Hugh Despenser the Elder, who stole some of the young earl's lands.

He allied himself with Queen Isabella and Roger Mortimer when they invaded England in 1326, and stood as one of the judges in the trials against both Despensers. When his nephew Edward III reached his majority and took the government into his own hands Thomas, who had helped with the deposition, became one of his principal advisors. It was in the capacity of Lord Marshal that he commanded the right wing of the English army at the Battle of Halidon Hill on 19 July 1333.

Thomas died in August or September 1338, and was buried in the choir of the Abbey of Bury St Edmunds. As he had no surviving sons, Thomas was succeeded by his daughter, Margaret, as Countess of Norfolk. She was later created Duchess of Norfolk for life in 1397.

As a son of Edward I of England, Thomas was entitled to bear the coat of arms of the Kingdom of England, differenced by a label argent of three points.

== Marriages and issue ==
Thomas married, firstly, before 8 January 1326, Alice de Hales (d. bef. 12 October 1330), daughter of Sir Roger de Hales of Hales Hall in Loddon in Roughton, Norfolk, a coroner, by his wife, Alice Skogan, by whom he had a son and two daughters:

- Margaret, Duchess of Norfolk, who married firstly John Segrave, 4th Baron Segrave, and secondly Wauthier de Masny.
- Edward of Norfolk, who married Beatrice Mortimer, daughter of Roger Mortimer, 1st Earl of March, but died without issue before 9 August 1334.
- Alice of Norfolk, who married Edward Montagu, 1st Baron Montagu.

Thomas's wife Alice died by October 1330, when a chantry was founded for her soul in Bosham, Sussex.

Thomas married, secondly, before 4 April 1336, Mary de Brewes (died 11 June 1362), widow of Sir Ralph de Cobham (died 5 February 1326), and daughter of Sir Peter de Brewes (died before 7 February 1312) of Tetbury, Gloucestershire, by Agnes de Clifford (died before 1332), by whom he had no surviving issue.

== Family ==
=== Ancestry ===
Ancestors of Thomas of Brotherton, 1st Earl of Norfolk

8. John, King of England
4. Henry III, King of England
9. Isabella, Countess of Angoulême
2. Edward I, King of England
10. Ramon Berenguer IV, Count of Provence
5. Eleanor of Provence
11. Beatrice of Savoy
1. Thomas, Earl of Norfolk
12. Louis IX, King of France
6. Philip III, King of France
13. Margaret of Provence(Sister of 5)
3. Margaret of France
14. Henry III, Duke of Brabant
7. Maria of Brabant
15. Adelaide of Burgundy

=== Family tree ===
Family tree of the Dukes of Norfolk; Earls of Arundel, East Anglia, Norfolk, Norwich, Nottingham, and Surrey; and Barons Mowbray, Segrave and Stourton

Earl of East Anglia (Earls of Norfolk and Suffolk) (1st creation), before 1069
Ralph the Staller c. 1011–1068; 1st Earl of Norfolk and Suffolk, or of the East Angles c. 1066/67–1068
Earl of Surrey (1st creation), c. 1088
Ralph de Gael c. 1040 – c. 1096; 2nd Earl of Norfolk and Suffolk, or of the East Angles until 1074	Roger Bigod of Norfolk d. 1107	William de Warenne c. 1035–1088; 1st Earl (of) Warenne / Earl of Surrey, Lord of Lewes, Seigneur de Varennes
Earldom forfeit, 1074
Earl of Norfolk (2nd creation), 1141
King Henry I c. 1068–1135	Maud Bigod	Hugh Bigod; 1095–1177; 1st Earl of Norfolk 1141–1177	William de Warenne d. 1138; 2nd Earl (of) Warenne / Earl of Surrey
Earl of Arundel, Earl of Sussex (1st creations), c. 1138
Empress Matilda c. 1102–1167	Geoffrey Plantagenet; 1113–1251; Count of Anjou	Adeliza of Louvain c. 1103–1151	William d'Aubigny c. 1109–1176; 1st Earl of Arundel, Earl of Sussex, Earl of Lincoln	William de Warenne; 1119–1148; 3rd Earl of Surrey
King Henry II; 1133–1189	William d'Aubigny b. c. 1138/1150–1176; 2nd Earl of Arundel, Earl of Sussex	Roger Bigod c. 1144/1150–1221; 2nd Earl of Norfolk 1189–1221 (disputed 1177–1189	William of Blois c. 1137–1159	Isabel de Warenne c. 1130 – 1203; 4th Countess of Surrey suo jure	Hamelin de Warenne c. 1130–1202; Comte de Warenne / Earl of Surrey, jure uxoris
King John; 1166/1167–1216	William d'Aubigny before 1180–1221; 3rd Earl of Arundel, Earl of Sussex	Hugh Bigod; 1186–1225; 3rd Earl of Norfolk 1221–1225	Maud Marshal; 1192–1248	William de Warenne c. 1160s/1170s–1240 5th Earl of Surrey
William d'Aubigny c. 1203–before 1224; 4th Earl of Arundel, Earl of Sussex	Hugh d'Aubigny d. 1243; 5th Earl of Arundel, Earl of Sussex	Isabel d'Aubigny	John Fitzalan; 1200–1240; 3rd Lord of Clun and Oswestry	Roger Bigod c. 1209–1270; 4th Earl of Norfolk 1233–1270	Hugh Bigod c. 1211–1266
King Henry III; 1207–1272	John Fitzalan; 1223–1267; 6th Earl of Arundel, Earl of Sussex, jure matris	John de Warenne; 1231–1304; 6th Earl of Surrey
Baron Segrave of Se(a)grave, 1283
Nicholas Segrave c. 1238–bef. 1295; 1st Baron Segrave	King Edward I 1239–1307	Edmund Crouchback; 1245–1296; Earl of Lancaster	John Fitzalan; 1246–1272; 7th Earl of Arundel, Earl of Sussex, jure matris	Roger Bigod c. 1245–1306; 5th Earl of Norfolk 1270–1306
Earldom extinct, 1270
Baron Mowbray, 1283	Earl of Arundel (2nd (1st by writ) creation), 1289
John Segrave c. 1256–1325; 2nd Baron Segrave	Roger de Mowbray; 1254–1297; 1st Baron Mowbray	Richard Fitzalan; 1267–1302; 1st (or 6th) Earl of Arundel	William de Warenne; 1256–1286
Earl of Norfolk (3rd creation), 1312
Stephen Segrave d. 1325; 3rd Baron Segrave	Thomas of Brotherton; 1300–1338; 1st Earl of Norfolk 1312–1338	John Mowbray; 1286–1322; 2nd Baron Mowbray	Henry c. 1281–1345; Earl of Leicester and Lancaster	Edmund Fitzalan; 1286–1326; 2nd (or 7th) Earl of Arundel	Alice de Warenne; 1287–1388 heir apparent to the Earldom of Surrey	John de Warenne; 1286–1347; 7th Earl of Surrey
Earldom of Arundel (2nd creation) forfeit, 1326
Earldom of Arundel (2nd creation) restored, 1331
John Segrave; 1315–1353; 4th Baron Segrave	Margaret of Brotherton; 1320–1399; 2nd Countess of Norfolk 1338–1399, Duchess of Norfolk "for life" 1397–1399	John Mowbray; 1310–1361; 3rd Baron Mowbray	Joan of Lancaster c. 1312–1349	Eleanor of Lancaster; 1318–1372	Richard FitzAlan c. 1313–1376; 3rd (or 8th) Earl of Arundel, 8th Earl of Surrey
Baron Arundel, 1377
Elizabeth de Segrave; 1338–1368; 5th Baroness Segrave	John de Mowbray; 1340–1368; 4th Baron Mowbray	Richard FitzAlan; 1346–1397; 4th (or 9th) Earl of Arundel, 9th Earl of Surrey	John FitzAlan c. 1348–1379; 1st Baron Arundel	Alice FitzAlan
Earldom of Arundel (2nd creation) forfeit, 1397
Earl of Nottingham (1st creation), 1377	Earl of Nottingham (2nd creation), 1383; Duke of Norfolk (1st creation), 1397	Duke of Surrey, 1397
John de Mowbray; 1365–1383; 1st Earl of Nottingham, 6th Baron Segrave, 5th Baron Mowbray	Thomas de Mowbray; 1366–1399; 1st Duke of Norfolk 1397–1399, 3rd Earl of Norfolk 1399, 7th Baron Segrave, 6th Baron Mowbray	Elizabeth Fitzalan; 1366–1425	John FitzAlan; 1364–1390; 2nd Baron Arundel	Thomas Holland; 1372–1400; Duke of Surrey, 3rd Earl of Kent, 4th Baron Holland
Earldom of Nottingham extinct, 1383	Titles forfeit, 1399	Dukedom of Surrey extinct, 1400
Baron Stourton, 1448	Duke of Norfolk (1st creation restored), 1425	Earldom of Arundel (2nd creation) restored, 1400
John Stourton; 1400–1462; 1st Baron Stourton, 1448–1462	Thomas de Mowbray; 1385–1405; 4th Earl of Norfolk, 8th Baron Segrave, 7th Baron Mowbray 1399–1405	John de Mowbray; 1392–1432; 2nd Duke of Norfolk 1425–1432, 5th Earl of Norfolk, 9th Baron Segrave, 8th Baron Mowbray 1405–1432	Margaret de Mowbray c. 1388–1459	Robert Howard; 1385–1436	Isabel de Mowbray c. 1400–1452	Thomas FitzAlan; 1381–1415; 5th (or 10th) Earl of Arundel, 10th Earl of Surrey	John Fitzalan; 1385–1421; 6th (or 11th) Earl of Arundel, 3rd Baron Arundel, 3rd Baron Maltravers
Duke of Norfolk (4th creation), 1483
William Stourton before 1426–1478; 2nd Baron Stourton, 1462–1478	John de Mowbray; 1415–1461; 3rd Duke of Norfolk, 6th Earl of Norfolk, 10th Baron Segrave, 9th Baron Mowbray 1432–1461	John Howard; 1425–1485; 1st Duke of Norfolk, 13th Baron Segrave, 12th Baron Mowbray 1483–1485	John Fitzalan; 1408–1435; 7th (or 12th) Earl of Arundel, 4th Baron Arundel, 4th Baron Maltravers	William Fitzalan; 1417–1487; 9th (or 14th) Earl of Arundel, 6th Baron Arundel, 6th Baron Maltravers
Titles forfeit, 1485
Earl of Surrey (2nd creation), 1451	Duke of Norfolk (4th creation) restored and Earl of Surrey, 1514
John Stourton c. 1454–1485; 3rd Baron Stourton, 1479–1485	William Stourton c. 1457–1524; 5th Baron Stourton, 1487–1524	John de Mowbray; 1444–1476; 4th Duke of Norfolk, 7th Earl of Norfolk, Earl of Surrey, 11th Baron Segrave, 10th Baron Mowbray 1461–1476	King Edward IV; 1442–1483	Thomas Howard; 1443–1524; 2nd Duke of Norfolk, 1st Earl of Surrey 1514–1524	Humfrey Fitzalan; 1429–1438; 8th (or 13th) Earl of Arundel, 5th Baron Arundel, 5th Baron Maltravers	Thomas Fitzalan; 1450–1524; 10th (or 15th) Earl of Arundel, 7th Baron Arundel, 7th Baron Maltravers
Dukedom of Norfolk, Earldom of Nottingham, Earldom of Surrey extinct, 1476
Duke of Norfolk (3rd creation), Earl of Nottingham (3rd creation), and Earl of Surrey, 1477
Francis Stourton; 1485–1487; 4th Baron Stourton, 1485–1487	Edward Stourton; 1463–1535; 6th Baron Stourton, 1524–1535	Anne de Mowbray; 1472–1481; 8th Countess of Norfolk, 12th Baroness Segrave, 11th Baroness Mowbray 1476–1481	Richard of Shrewsbury; 1473–1483; Duke of York, Duke of Norfolk, Earl of Nottingham, Earl of Warenne 1477–1483	Anne of York; 1475–1511	Thomas Howard; 1473–1554; 3rd Duke of Norfolk, 2nd Earl of Surrey 1524–1554	Edmund Howard c. 1478–1539	Elizabeth Boleyn c. 1480–1538	William Fitzalan; 1476–1544; 11th (or 16th) Earl of Arundel, 8th Baron Arundel, 8th Baron Maltravers
Earldom of Norfolk extinct and Baronies Segrave and Mowbray in abeyance, 1481	Dukedom of Norfolk, Earldom of Nottingham, Earldom of Surrey extinct, 1483	Attainted, 1547; Restored, 1553
William Stourton c. 1505–1548; 7th Baron Stourton	Earl of Nottingham (5th creation), 1525	King Henry VIII; 1491–1547	Anne Boleyn c. 1501 or 1507–1536
Viscount Howard of Bindon, 1559
Charles Stourton c. 1520–1557; 8th Baron Stourton	Henry Howard; 1517–1547 styled Earl of Surrey	Thomas Howard c. 1520–1582; 1st Viscount Howard of Bindon	Mary FitzRoy; 1519–1557	Henry FitzRoy; 1519–1536; Duke of Richmond and Somerset, Earl of Nottingham	Catherine Howard c. 1524–1542	Henry Fitzalan; 1512–1580; 12th (or 17th) Earl of Arundel, 9th Baron Arundel, 9th Baron Maltravers
Earldom of Nottingham extinct, 1536
Thomas Howard; 1536–1572; 4th Duke of Norfolk, 3rd Earl of Surrey, 13th Baron Mowbray 1554–1572	Henry Howard; 1540–1614; Earl of Northampton	Queen Elizabeth I 1533–1603	Mary FitzAlan; 1540–1557
Dukedom (3rd creation) forfeit, 1572
Earl of Arundel (3rd creation), 1580	Earl of Suffolk (4th creation), 1603
John Stourton; 1553–1588; 9th Baron Stourton	Edward Stourton c. 1555–1633; 10th Baron Stourton	Philip Howard; 1557–1595; 20th/13th/1st Earl of Arundel, styled Earl of Surrey	Thomas Howard; 1561–1626; Earl of Suffolk	Lord William Howard; 1563–1640
Earldom of Arundel and Barony of Mowbray attainted, 1589	see Earls, Marquesses, and Dukes of Suffolk family tree
Earl of Arundel (3rd creation) and Barony of Mowbray restored, 1604; Earl of Norfolk (5th creation), 1644
William Stourton c. 1594–1672; 11th Baron Stourton	Thomas Howard; 1585–1646; 21st/14th/2nd Earl of Arundel, 2nd/4th Earl of Surrey, 1st Earl of Norfolk, 14th Baron Mowbray 1644–1646	Philip
see Earls of Shrewsbury family tree
Edward Stourton; 1617–1644	Henry Frederick Howard; 1608–1652; 22nd/15th/3rd Earl of Arundel, 3rd/5th Earl of Surrey, 2nd Earl of Norfolk, 15th Baron Mowbray 1646–1652	Alethea Howard; 1585–1654; 17th Baroness Strange of Blackmere, 14th Baroness Talbot, 13th Baroness Furnivall	William Howard; 1614–1680; 1st Viscount Stafford	William
Duke of Norfolk (4th creation restored), 1660	Baron Howard of Castle Rising, 1669; Earl of Norwich (3rd creation), 1672
William Stourton d. 1685; 12th Baron Stourton	Thomas Howard; 1627–1677; 5th Duke of Norfolk, 21st/14th/2nd Earl of Arundel, 4th/6th Earl of Surrey, 16th Baron Mowbray 1660–1677; 18th Baron Strange of Blackmere, 15th Baron Talbot, 14th Baron Furnivall 1654–1677	Henry Howard; 1628–1684; 6th Duke of Norfolk, 22nd/15th/3rd Earl of Arundel, 5th/7th Earl of Surrey, 1st Earl of Norwich and Baron Howard of Castle Rising, 18th Baron Strange of Blackmere, 17th Baron Mowbray, 15th Baron Talbot, 14th Baron Furnivall 1672–1684	Hon. Charles Howard; 1630–1713	Col. Bernard Howard; 1641–1717	Charles Howard, 1st Earl of Carlisle Earls of Carlisle
Edward Stourton; 1665–1720; 13th Baron Stourton	Thomas Stourton; 1667–1744; 14th Baron Stourton	Charles Stourton; 1669–1739	Henry Howard; 1655–1701; 7th Duke of Norfolk, 22nd/15th/3rd Earl of Arundel, 5th/7th Earl of Surrey, 2nd Earl of Norwich and Baron Howard of Castle Rising, 18th Baron Mowbray, 19th Baron Strange of Blackmere, 15th Baron Talbot, 14th Baron Furnivall, 1684–1701	Lord Thomas Howard; 1662–1689	Henry Charles Howard d. 1720
Thomas Howard; 1683–1732; 8th Duke of Norfolk, 23rd/16th/4th Earl of Arundel, 6th/8th Earl of Surrey, 3rd Earl of Norwich and Baron Howard of Castle Rising, 18th Baron Strange of Blackmere, 15th Baron Talbot, 14th Baron Furnivall, 19th Baron Mowbray 1701–1732	Edward Howard; 1685–1777; 9th Duke of Norfolk, 24th/17th/5th Earl of Arundel, 7th/9th Earl of Surrey, 4th Earl of Norwich and Baron Howard of Castle Rising, 20th Baron Mowbray, 20th Baron Strange of Blackmere, 15th Baron Talbot, 14th Baron Furnivall 1732–1777	Philip Howard; 1688–1750	Bernard Howard; 1674–1735
Earldom of Norwich (3rd creation) and Barony of Howard of Castle Rising extinct and Baronies of Furnivall, Mowbray, Segrave, Strange of Blackmere, and Talbot abeyant, 1777
Charles Stourton; 1702–1753; 15th Baron Stourton	William Stourton; 1704–1781; 16th Baron Stourton	Winifred Howard; 1726–1753	Anne Howard; 1742–1787	Charles Howard; 1720–1786; 10th Duke of Norfolk, 25th/18th/6th Earl of Arundel, 8th/10th Earl of Surrey 1777–1786	Henry Howard; 1713–1787
Charles Philip Stourton; 1752–1816; 17th Baron Stourton	Charles Howard; 1746–1815; 11th Duke of Norfolk, 26th/19th/7th Earl of Arundel, 9th/11th Earl of Surrey 1786–1815
William Stourton; 1776–1846; 18th Baron Stourton	Bernard Howard; 1765–1842; 12th Duke of Norfolk, 27th/20th/8th Earl of Arundel, 10th/12th Earl of Surrey 1815–1842
Charles Stourton; 1802–1872; 19th Baron Stourton	Henry Howard; 1791–1856; 13th Duke of Norfolk, 28th/21st/9th Earl of Arundel, 11th/13th Earl of Surrey 1842–1856
Baron Mowbray and Baron Segrave abeayance restored, 1878	Baron Howard of Glossop
Alfred Joseph Stourton; 1829–1893; 24th Baron Segrave, 21st/23rd Baron Mowbray, 20th Baron Stourton	Henry Granville Fitzalan-Howard; 1815–1860; 14th Duke of Norfolk, 29th/22nd/10th Earl of Arundel, 12th/14th Earl of Surrey 1856–1860	Edward George Fitzalan-Howard; 1818–1883; 1st Baron Howard of Glossop
Charles Botolph Joseph Stourton; 1867–1936; 25th Baron Segrave, 22nd/24th Baron Mowbray, 21st Baron Stourton	Henry Fitzalan-Howard; 1847–1917; 15th Duke of Norfolk, 30th/23rd/11th Earl of Arundel, 13th/15th Earl of Surrey, Lord Maltravers, Earl of Arundel and Surrey 1860–1917	Francis Fitzalan-Howard; 1859–1924; 2nd Baron Howard of Glossop
William Marmaduke Stourton; 1895–1965; 26th Baron Segrave, 23rd/25th Baron Mowbray, 22nd Baron Stourton	Bernard Fitzalan-Howard; 1908–1975; 16th Duke of Norfolk, 31st/24th/12th Earl of Arundel, 14th/16th Earl of Surrey 1917–1975	Bernard Fitzalan-Howard; 1885–1972; 3rd Baron Howard of Glossop
Charles Edward Stourton; 1923–2006; 27th Baron Segrave, 24th/26th Baron Mowbray, 23rd Baron Stourton	Miles Fitzalan-Howard; 1915–2002; 17th Duke of Norfolk, 32nd/25th/13th Earl of Arundel, 15th/17th Earl of Surrey, 4th Baron Howard of Glossop 1975–2002
Edward William Stephen Stourton; 1953–2021; 28th Baron Segrave, 25th/27th Baron Mowbray, 24th Baron Stourton	Edward Fitzalan-Howard b. 1956; 18th Duke of Norfolk, 33rd/26th/14th Earl of Arundel, 16th/18th Earl of Surrey, 5th Baron Howard of Glossop from 2002
James Charles Peter Stourton b. 1991; 29th Baron Segrave, 26th/28th Baron Mowbray, 25th Baron Stourton	Henry Fitzalan-Howard b. 1987 styled Earl of Arundel and Surrey

== Bibliography ==
- Archer, Rowena E. (2004). "'Brotherton, Margaret, suo jure duchess of Norfolk (c. 1320–1399)". Oxford Dictionary of National Biography (online ed.). Oxford University Press. doi:10.1093/ref:odnb/53070. (Subscription, Wikipedia Library access or UK public library membership required.)
- Childs, Wendy (1997). "Resistance and Treason in the Vita Edwardi Secundi". In Prestwich, Michael; Britnell, R. H.; Frame, Robin (eds.). Thirteenth Century England VI: Proceedings of the Durham Conference 1995. The Boydell Press.
- Cokayne, George Edward (1936). The Complete Peerage, edited by H.A. Doubleday and Lord Howard de Walden. Vol. IX. London: St. Catherine Press. pp. 596–9.
- Hilton, Lisa (2008). Queens Consort, England's Medieval Queens. London: Weidenfeld & Nicolson. p. 240. ISBN 978-0-7538-2611-9.
- Oman, Charles (1978). A History of the Art of War in the Middle Ages. Vol. 2 (3rd ed.). Routledge.
- Ormrod, W.M. (2011). Edward III. Yale University Press.
- Prestwich, Michael (1988). Edward I. Yale University Press.
- Richardson, Douglas (2011). Everingham, Kimball G. (ed.). Plantagenet Ancestry: A Study in Colonial and Medieval Families. Vol. II (2nd ed.). Salt Lake City. ISBN 978-1449966348.
- Richardson, Douglas (2011). Everingham, Kimball G. (ed.). Magna Carta Ancestry: A Study in Colonial and Medieval Families. Vol. IV (2nd ed.). Salt Lake City. ISBN 978-1460992708.
- Mitchell, Linda E. (2010). "Maud Marshal and Margaret Marshal: Two Viragos Extraordinaire". In French, Katherine L.; Biggs, Douglas L. (eds.). The Ties that Bind: Essays in Medieval British History in Honor of Barbara Hanawalt. Routledge. pp. 121–142.
- Waugh, Scott L. (2004). "Thomas, first earl of Norfolk (1300–1338)". Oxford Dictionary of National Biography (online ed.). Oxford University Press. doi:10.1093/ref:odnb/27196. (Subscription, Wikipedia Library access or UK public library membership required.)

Political offices
Preceded by Nicholas Seagrave	Lord Marshal; 1316–1338	Succeeded by The Countess of Norfolk
Peerage of England
New creation	Earl of Norfolk; 3rd creation 1312–1338	Succeeded by Margaret
