= Manor of Byng =

Former manorial estate in Suffolk, UK

Coordinates: 52.1349°N 1.3429°E

The Manor of Byng is a former manorial estate located in the county of Suffolk, UK. The manor house is the 16th-century Byng Hall. The manor is located within the area known as Pettistree, near Ufford. The manor includes Byng Hall Lane, Byng Lane, Byng Brook and a considerable amount of the local farmland stretching to the outskirts of Wickham Market.

== Ancient history ==
Historically referred to as Beagingas or Benga/ges, Byng was originally a 6th-century settlement located in Suffolk near Sutton Hoo which formed part of the Kingdom of East Anglia. The place name, Beagingas, means Beagas people. Referred to as Benga/Benges at the time of the survey. Bing was recorded in the Domesday Book as Benga/Benges.

== Modern history ==
Walter de Caen held the manor as tenant-in-chief from Robert Malet's mother. This manor formed part of the Easton Estate once owned by the Earl of Rochford, and later the Dukes of Hamilton.

The first historical details of the manor were recorded in the Domesday Book which stated prior to the Norman Conquest the manor was in the estate of Edric in Edward the Confessor's time, and was held by Robert Malet at the time of the survey. The original manor land in the Domesday Book was recorded as being 234 acres (95 ha).

No manor apparently existed in Saxon times but Edric held a carucate and a half of land, with 1 villein, 1 bordar, 1 serf, 1 ploughteam, 2 acres of meadow, 1 rouney, 4 beasts, 16 hogs and 80 sheep valued at 20s. In Norman days the value had doubled and there were; 2 bordars, 2 ploughteams.

Another portion of land here was held in Saxon times by Godric under commendation to Edric with 40 acres, 1 bordar, and 1 ploughteam valued at 7s, and under him were two freemen with 12 acres and half a ploughteam valued at 2s. The conquest had the effect of making Godric hold of Walter de Caen, who held of Robert Malet as tenant in Chief.

In 1253 Roger de Huntingfield held the manor, which on his death in 1256 went to his widow Joan, who died in 1297, when it passed to her grandson and heir Roger de Huntingfield, son of her son, William de Huntingfield who had died in 1282. Roger de Huntingfield died in 1302. When the manor passed to his son and heir, William de Huntingfield, and on his death in 1313 a third passed in dower to his widow Sibilla and subject thereto vested in his son and heir - Roger de Huntingfield, then aged eight years. On the Close Rolls for 1314 is an order to the escheator not to meddle with the lands in Bing "late held by William de Huntingfield of the King as of the Honour of Eye by Knights service". On the same rolls in 1327 is an order to discharge Walter de Norwich of a third of the manor which "Sibyl the widow of William de Huntingfield" held in dower. Roger de Huntingfield died in 1337, when the manor went to his son and heir, William de Huntingfield who died in 1376 without issue. The manor then went under settlement to William de Ufford, 2nd Earl of Suffolk, for life, and in 1383 John de Pyeshale, clerk, and Robert de Ashfield, no doubt trustees, in whom the manor had been vested for this purpose, had licence to grant to the prioress and convent of Campsea Ashe. With the priory the manor is said to have continued until the dissolution of that house. In 1538 King Henry VIII, granted the manor to Anthony Wingfield, Knt, and it is said he had licence in 1551 to alienate to Thomas, Lord Wentworth. The manor however did not leave the Wingfield family, for Sir Anthony died seised of it 20 August 1552. When it passed to his son and heir Sir Robert Wingfield. In the time of Queen Elizabeth, Sir James Wingfield, Knt, was called upon to show title to the manor. On Sir Roberts death in 1596 the manor passed to his son and heir, Sir Anthony, who dying without issue it went to his brother Sir Thomas Wingfield who died in 1609.

From this time to the death of Sir Henry Wingfield 4th bart in 1677 the manor descended in the same course as the manor of Dallinghoo, in Loes Hundred from the 4th bart, Sir Henry Wingfield, this manor passed to his son and heir Sir Henry Wingfield 5th bart, who sold it in 1708 to William Nassau de Zuylestein, 1st Earl of Rochford, who died the same year. The manor passed to his son and heir William Nassau de Zuylestein, 2nd Earl of Rochford, who died in 1710 at the battle of Almenar. The manor passed to his son and heir Frederick van Nassau de Zuylnstein, 3rd Earl of Rochford who died in 1738. The manor then passed to his son and heir Richard Savage Nassau, born 1 June 1723. He married Anne Spencer, widow of James Hamilton 5th Duke of Hamilton. On the death of Richard Savage Nassau on 17 May 1780, the manor passed to his son and heir William Henry Nassau de Zuylestein, 5th Earl of Rochford, born 28 June 1754. William became 5th Earl Rochford upon the death of his cousin William Henry Nassau de Zuylestein, 4th Earl of Rochford who died without issue. William 5th Earl of Rochford died on 3 September 1830, and the manor passed to Alexander Douglas-Hamilton, 10th Duke of Hamilton, born 5 October 1767. Alexander was also 7th Duke of Brandon. Alexander died 18 August 1852, the manor passed to his son and heir William Douglas-Hamilton, 11th Duke of Hamilton, born 18 February 1811. William, 11th Duke of Hamilton married Princess Marie Zahringen, ancestor of the current Prince of Monaco. William, 11th Duke of Hamilton, died 15 July 1863 in Paris and the manor passed to his son and heir William Douglas-Hamilton, 12th Duke of Hamilton, born 12 March 1845. He married Lady Mary Louisa Elizabeth Montagu on 10 December 1873. In 1895, the 12th Duke died and the manor passed to his daughter Lady Mary Louise Hamilton, born 1 November 1884. Lady Hamilton married James Graham 6th Duke of Montrose, Marquess of Graham, on 14 June 1906. The manor, along with the manors of Easton, Letheringham, Kettleburgh - Charsfield, Hoo-Charsfield, Martley Hall, Hoo, and Wickham with its members, was sold by Lady Mary on 14 September 1920 to Adolphus George Maskell, Solicitor, of Chelmsford, Essex. The manor along with Wickham with its members, was sold by Maskell on 9 January 1934, to Adnams Brewery of Southwold, Suffolk. The manor was held by Adnams until it was sold on 14 February 2003 to Richard Glasgow of Leadenham, Lincolnshire, who is the current Lord of the manor of Byng, Suffolk, and the manors of Stotfold, and Spalding. Richard Glasgow is a descendant of Benjamin Whitney of the Worlingham Hall estate, steward for the Earl of Gosford.

== Lord of the manor of Byng ==
Below is a partial list of lords of the manor of Byng. The dates are taken from mention in historical documents held by Suffolk Records Office and reflect length of ownership.

- Prior to 1066 Edric
- 1066 to 1086 Robert Malet and Walter de Caen
- 1086 to 1253 Held by the Peyton and Huntingfield family
- 1253 to 1256 Roger de Huntingfield
- 1256 to 1297 Joan de Huntingfield
- 1297 to 1302 Roger de Huntingfield
- 1302 to 1313 William de Huntingfield
- 1313 to 1337 Roger de Huntingfield
- 1337 to 1376 William de Huntingfield
- 1376 to 1382 William de Ufford, 2nd Earl of Suffolk
- 1382 to 1538 Priory of Campsea Ashe
- 1538 to 1538 King Henry VIII
- 1538 to 1552 Sir Anthony Wingfield
- 1552 to 1596 Sir Robert Wingfield
- 1596 to 1601 Sir Anthony Wingfield
- 1596 to 1609 Sir Thomas Wingfield
- 1609 to 1677 Sir Henry Wingfield 1st, 2nd, 3rd, and 4th Baronet
- 1677 to 1708 Sir Henry Wingfield 5th Baronet
- 1708 to 1708 William Nassau de Zuylestein, 1st Earl of Rochford
- 1708 to 1710 William Nassau de Zuylestein, 2nd Earl of Rochford
- 1710 to 1738 Frederick Nassau de Zuylestein, 3rd Earl of Rochford
- 1738 to 1781 Richard Savage Nassau
- 1781 to 1830 William Henry Nassau de Zuylestein, 5th Earl of Rochford
- 1830 to 1852 Alexander Douglas-Hamilton, 10th Duke of Hamilton
- 1852 to 1863 William Douglas-Hamilton, 11th Duke of Hamilton and 8th Duke of Brandon
- 1863 to 1895 William Douglas-Hamilton, 12th Duke of Hamilton, 9th Duke of Brandon, 2nd Duke of Châtellerault KT
- 1895 to 1920 Lady Mary Louise Graham née Hamilton, Marchioness of Graham
- 1920 to 1934 Adolphus George Maskell
- 1934 to 2003 Adnams Brewery
- 2003 Richard Glasgow
