= Campsey Priory =

Religious house in Suffolk, England

- Location within Suffolk

Monastery information
- Order: Canonesses Regular of St Augustine
- Established: by 1195
- Disestablished: 1536
- Dedication: House of the Blessed Virgin Mary
- Diocese: Norwich

People
- Founder: Theobald de Valognes II
- Important associated figures: Maud of Lancaster, Countess of Ulster

Site
- Location: Campsea Ash, Suffolk, England
- Coordinates: 52.1396°N 1.3865°E
- Visible remains: possibly parts of chaplains' house
- Public access: no

Campsey Priory (Campesse, Kampessie, etc.) was a religious house of Augustinian canonesses at Campsea Ashe, Suffolk, about 1.5 miles (2.5 km) southeast of Wickham Market. It was founded shortly before 1195 on behalf of two of his sisters by Theobald de Valoines (died 1209), who, with his wife Avice, had previously founded Hickling Priory in Norfolk for male canons in 1185. Both houses were suppressed in 1536.

Campsey Priory was one of a group of monasteries in south-east Suffolk with interconnected histories, associated with the family of the elder Theobald de Valoines (Valognes, Valeines etc.), Lord of Parham (fl. 1135). These include Butley Priory (founded 1171) and Leiston Abbey (1182–83), both founded by his son-in-law Ranulf de Glanville, Chief Justiciar of England, husband of his daughter Bertha. Her sister Matilda was mother of Hubert Walter, Theobald Walter and Osbert fitzHervey. The founder of Campsey Priory was the son of Robert de Valoines and heir to the estate of Parham. During the 14th century the priory enjoyed the special patronage of the de Ufford Earls of Suffolk and their family. Maud of Lancaster, Countess of Ulster was a commanding presence, by whose efforts Bruisyard Abbey was established from Campsey.

Much of the fabric of the priory was plundered after the suppression or incorporated into later buildings, but some remains were recorded during the 18th century. The site is now a private residence and not accessible to the public. Occasional excavations have been conducted. A very extensive list of documentary sources is given by Bishop Tanner; additional grants and other documents are held in the Suffolk Records, and some early books associated with the priory survive.

== Foundation ==
The founder succeeded to his father Robert de Valoines in 1178. Before 1195 he gave all his land at Campsey to his sisters Joan and Agnes de Valoines to build there a house for themselves and other religious women, to be dedicated to Mary the mother of God. Gilbert Pecche, who succeeded his father Hamon as a fee-lord in Suffolk after 1191, confirmed the grant. These (lost) grants were confirmed by King John in January 1203/04 to Joan and Agnes and their successors. Theobald died in c. 1209 leaving an heir Thomas, who joined the Barons against King John and briefly had his lands confiscated.

The site chosen was a secluded spot with direct river and road access to important centres nearby, and plentiful natural resources. Skirting between Wickham Market and Lower Hacheston, where the Rivers Deben and Ore (a tributary of the Alde, passing Parham) are barely a mile apart, the freshwater channel of the Deben turns south and meanders through a broad valley of water-meadows past Rendlesham and Pettistree to the lower crossing at Ufford. The priory was located at a higher crossing, on the east bank of the river, at the foot of the land sloping down through Ash and Loudham on the Campsey side. To its north the river flowed into a meare before issuing past the priory and its adjacent watermill.

=== Prioress Joan de Valoines ===
Theobald's sisters built the priory at Campsey and established the community there with Joan de Valoines as the first prioress. The priory was in existence by November 1195 when John Lestrange, in a final concord with Robert de Mortimer, noted that with Robert's approval he had already given the church of Tottington, Norfolk, in free and perpetual alms to the church of the Blessed Mary at Campsey and to the nuns serving God there. At Tottington, birthplace of Samson, Abbot of Bury St Edmunds (1182–1211), the Priory always held some title: the advowson was quitclaimed to Prioress Joan in 1211, and she asserted her title further in 1219. Thomas de Valoines granted various lands at Parham to Joan for the priory in 1221, and an All Hallows fair at Hacheston, beside Parham, was granted to Hickling Priory in 1226. In 1228 Joan released the priory's manor of Helmingham to Bartholomew de Creke, whose sister Isabel was the mother of Thomas's heir, Robert de Valoines. Thomas was apparently living in 1230.

Joan's long rule culminated in 1228–1230 in a dispute with Prior Adam of Butley Priory over the right to the tithes of Dilham church and mill in Norfolk. First the Abbot of St Benet's at Hulme (Norfolk) and other papal commissioners judged in Butley's favour. The prioress appealed to Rome against the decision, which caused the commissioners to declare the Prioress and Priory of Campsey excommunicate. The Pope referred her appeal to the Prior of Anglesey Priory (Cambridgeshire) and others, who would not carry out the excommunication. Butley Priory obtained papal letters to the Prior of Great Yarmouth (Norfolk) and others to have it enforced. The prioress pleaded that, since she had appealed before the order of excommunication, she and every excommunicated person had the right to defend themselves, and that the Prior of Anglesey's commission had acted rightly in refusing to implement it. The Prior of Yarmouth's commission would not accept this plea, and the Prioress again appealed to Rome. The whole matter was then referred to the Dean of Lincoln (William de Thornaco) and the Archdeacons of Lincoln and Stowe, and in June 1230 the original order allocating the tithes to Butley Priory was enforced.

=== Patrons and prioresses ===
Joan's sister Agnes had become prioress by 1234, when Hamo de Valoines represented her in a land transaction. Hamo also witnessed grants to the priory by Stephen and William de Ludham, in the hamlet of Loudham in Pettistree. Robert de Valoines was however the heir of Thomas, succeeding to his knight-service at Richmond Castle owing from Parham. He married Roisia (younger sister of William le Blund) before 1247, when their son Robert the younger was born. The Campsey nuns opposed Robert's claim to be their patron. Some time between 1244 and 1257 he came to an agreement with them, by which they accepted Robert and his heirs as their patrons, and he in turn assured their right to elect their own prioress, who should be presented to him for approval, and renounced any right to sell off their lands while he had wardship during a vacancy. Roger Bigod, 4th Earl of Norfolk and Hugh Bigod witnessed their settlement. In 1258 Prioress Basilia (de Wachisham) received a grant of property in Burgate.

Robert de Valoines died in or before 1268 leaving an heir Robert the younger, who married Eva, widow of Nicholas Tregoz of Tolleshunt D'Arcy in Essex. At about this time Margery, daughter of Sir Gilbert Pecche (d. 1291), married Nicholas de Crioll the younger, hereditary patron of Butley Priory and Leiston Abbey. He in his father's lifetime bestowed those rights upon Margery with the manor of Benhall, in dower. Meanwhile, the prioress of Campsey was bringing pleas in 1273–1277 against Humphrey de Bohun, Earl of Essex, and Henry de Bohun for annual rents from Nuthampstead in Hertfordshire. Robert and Eva de Valoines had two daughters, Roisia (c. 1279) and Cecily (c. 1280). These infants became his heirs when he died in 1281. Eva, a cousin of King Edward I, survived her second husband and had for her dower the manors of Tolleshunt Tregoz and Bluntishall (Blunt's Hall, Witham) by the king's command. Cecily was heir to Campsey Priory.

=== The priory environment ===
The construction of the priory church and conventual buildings is likely to have proceeded through the early 13th century. In the late 18th century, when various ruins were visible, a plan was attempted suggesting a cloister yard measuring some 78 feet north to south and some 70 feet west to east, taking into account the width of a passage on the east side which presumably entered into the cloister walk. Substantial remains of the west range then existed (with large buttresses on its west side) which still partially survives in a converted barn structure which includes an early doorway at the northern end of its east (cloister-side) front. It also shows part of a string course forming the creasing of a lean-to roof for the cloister walkway.

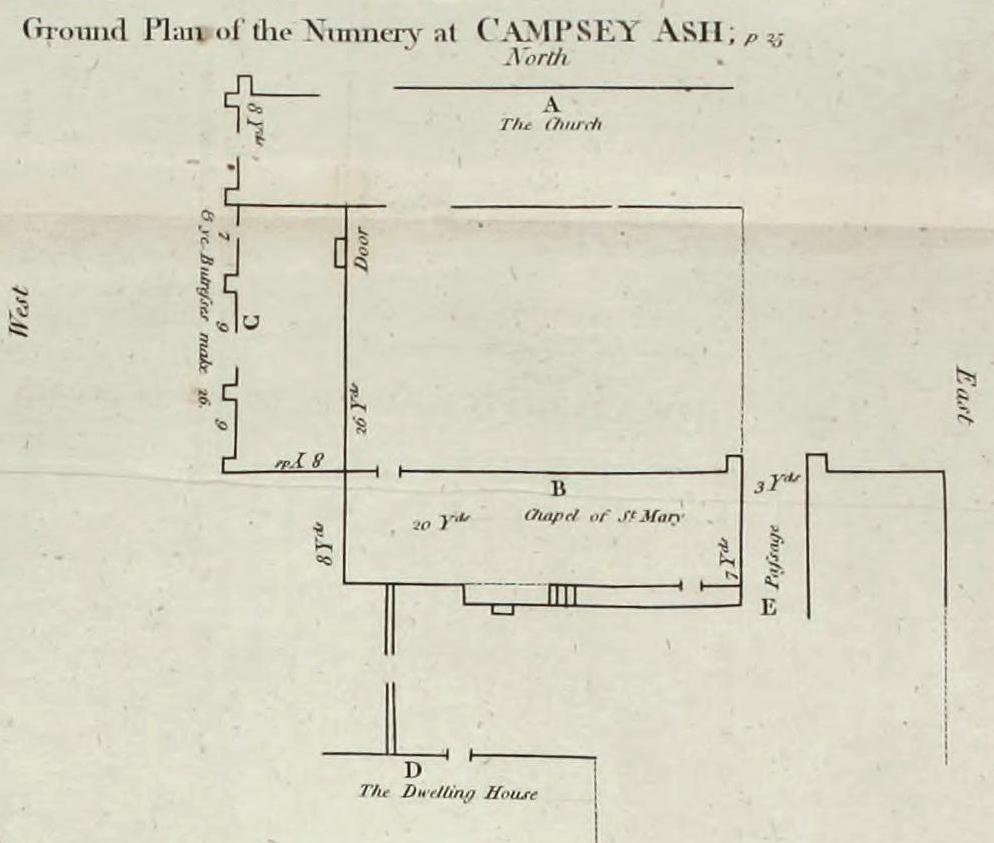
Ground Plan attempted by Nichols, c. 1790

The nave of the priory church ran as usual along the north side of the cloister, but the plan includes no evidence of the choir. Excavations in 1970 confirmed the position of the north-east corner of the cloister where the passage entered the church, and part of an aisle chapel on the south side of the choir. An important series of tiles was found, including examples of the embossed relief tiles of the type associated with the early 13th century phase of building at Butley Priory nearby. The east range was largely indeterminable. The south range (marked "Chapel of St Mary" on the plan) was evidently the refectory or frater, and survived to some height in 1785. A watercolour by Isaac Johnson shows a series of tall arched windows likely to belong to this building, and the plan indicates a corridor and steps leading up to the frater lectern podium on the south side.

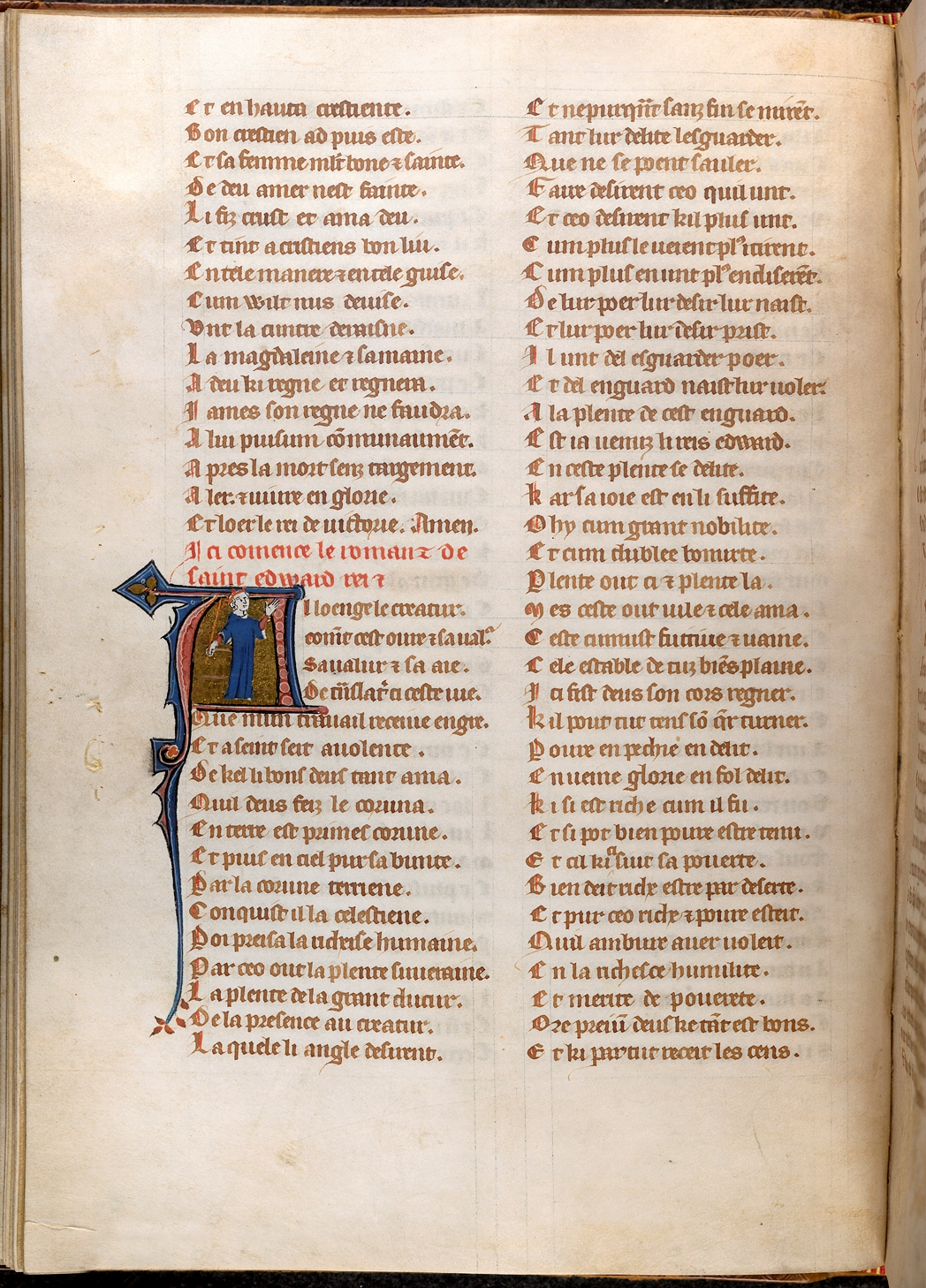
The "Campsey Manuscript", fol. 55v, Life of Edward the Confessor, in the British Library

There are various evidences that, in this aristocratic house, the language of use was Anglo-Norman. An important book inscribed Cest livere est a covent de Campisse is a large volume of Saints' Lives in Anglo-Norman verse (known as the "Campsey Manuscript", now in the British Library). This was used for mealtime readings in the Campsey refectory. The main part of the book contains Lives of Thomas Becket (by Guernes de Pont-Sainte-Maxence), Edward the Confessor, Archbishop Edmund Rich, St Etheldreda, St Osyth, St Faith, St Modwenna, Richard de Wych and the Life of St Catherine by Clemence of Barking. Appended to this are Lives of St Elizabeth of Hungary, St Paphnutius and St Paul the Hermit, attributed to Nicholas Bozon. This stimulating collection, with several items of East Anglian and feminine interest, was compiled between 1275 and 1325, and is beautifully written. A Latin Psalter which belonged to the priory, apparently produced c. 1247–1249, with superbly foliated initial letters, includes Calendar references to the East Anglian saints Seaxburga, Wihtburga and Edmund the Martyr, and has additions referring to Edmund Rich, Modwenna, etc., reflecting the Lives in the Campsey Collection.

The 14th-century seal of the priory depicts the Virgin Mary, crowned and seated on a throne, the Child Jesus standing on her right knee, within a triple-arched canopied niche. (This devotional image, the "Seat of Wisdom", alludes to Mary as the Mother of God, a popular but not the most prevalent form of her cult in medieval England.) Below, between two flowering branches, is a shield with heraldic device. The inscription on the seal reads: "Priorisse et Conventus S. Marie de Campissey".

== Ufford patronage ==
=== The Valoines alliance ===
The priory came to the Uffords by the marriage of Cecily de Valoines to Robert, Lord of Ufford, in or before c. 1295. Lord Ufford (1279–1316) succeeded his distinguished father, a notable Justiciar of Ireland, who died in 1298 seised of the manors of Bawdsey and Ufford, the town of Orford with Orford Castle, the soke of Wykes in Ipswich, the township of Wickham Market, the rents of Ufford, Dallinghoo, Rendlesham and Woodbridge, the advowsons of Wickham Market and Ufford with its chapel of Sogenho, and lands in Melton. Cecily's inheritance, including the patronage of Campsey Priory (with its own extensive endowments represented in the Taxatio Ecclesiastica of 1291–92) greatly enlarged the sphere of this seat of power. In 1306 she received a de Creke legacy including the advowson of Helmingham, which she gave to her family's nunnery at Flixton Priory.

The de Ufford estates faced the demesne lands and churches of Butley Priory directly. In 1290 the patronage of the Butley and Leiston monasteries passed (with the manor of Benhall) to Guy Ferre the younger, an important and trusted figure in the royal administration in Gascony, and Seneschal in 1308–09. He associated his wife in the title and before his death in 1323 enriched Butley Priory with its fine Gatehouse. Lord Ufford, who was summoned as a baron to parliament, had six sons and a daughter, and died in 1316, succeeded by his second son Robert de Ufford as heir in 1318. Cecily died in 1325: a year previously Robert had married Margaret, daughter of Sir Walter de Norwich (Chief Baron of the Exchequer, died 1329) of Mettingham Castle, and widow of Thomas, Lord de Cailli of Buckenham Castle and Hilborough, Norfolk.

=== Chantries ===
Amid Robert de Ufford's swift rise in the favour of King Edward III a perpetual chantry was established at Campsey Priory in 1333, at the application of Queen Philippa, for a canon and two assistants to sing masses there for the soul of Alice of Hainault, Countess Marshal (died 1317), widow of the 5th Earl of Norfolk. At about this time Maria de Wyngfield was prioress of Campsey. Following the death of the Earl of Cornwall, in 1337 Robert was created Earl of Suffolk, his maintenance including the Honour of Eye with the reversion of the manor of Benhall (with patronage of Butley Priory and Leiston Abbey) which, however, rested for life with Guy Ferre's widow Eleanor (died 1349).

The Earl's brother Sir Ralph de Ufford also enjoyed royal favour and rewards, and was made Constable of Corfe Castle in 1341. He married Maud of Lancaster, widow of William Donn de Burgh, 3rd Earl of Ulster, the Justiciar assassinated at Carrickfergus in 1333. They were married by August 1343, when they obtained papal indults from Clement VI to choose confessors, hold portable altars, and to have religious persons eat flesh at their table. Sir Ralph became Justiciar of Ireland in February 1344. After two years of stern and unpopular rule, while his wife lived as a queen at Kilmainham Priory, he died there at Easter 1346. The Countess returned with his body and he was buried in the chapel of the Annunciation in Campsey Priory church.

Maud, whose sister Isabel was prioress of Amesbury Priory, resolved to join the Campsey sisterhood. Supported by her brother Henry of Grosmont she arranged endowments for a perpetual chantry of five male chaplains (one the warden) to sing daily masses in that chapel for Ralph's soul. In August 1347, taking the veil, she was allowed income from her estates for one further year, after which 200 marks were assigned to the priory yearly during her life. In October the chantry was ordained for the souls of both husbands, for her daughters Elizabeth de Burgh and Maud de Ufford, and for the welfare of herself, of John de Ufford and Thomas de Hereford (grantors), and with a house in the nearby settlement of Ash-by-Rendlesham for the chaplains. Both her daughters were married by 1350 in childhood, Elizabeth to Lionel of Antwerp, and Maud to Thomas de Vere.

=== The college at Bruisyard ===
Campsey's small college of secular priests survived the Great Mortality of 1348–49 and remained at Ash until 1354. Its first master, John de Haketon, was appointed in January 1349 and the second, John de Aston, in 1352. The Earl's brothers Edmund and John de Ufford, with others, simultaneously granted the manor of Stanford, Norfolk and Roke Hall in Bruisyard, Suffolk in January 1353. It was now arranged that the chaplains (who were all old men) should set up their college anew at Bruisyard. It was urged that the walk from Ash to the priory was hard for them, their masses clashed with the singing in the nuns' choir, and that clerks and women ought to live separately. With a further endowment by Thomas de Holebrok on 13 August 1354, Bishop William Bateman set forth preliminary statutes: they were to live, eat and sleep communally, and to follow the Use of Sarum in their three daily masses in a new collegiate church of the Annunciation at Roke Hall. All parties assented between 18 and 24 August 1354, and the college under John de Aston was accordingly translated there. Bishop Bateman died unexpectedly in 1355, but full and lengthy statutes were set forth by Maud of Lancaster in 1356.

Robert de Ufford, occupied with military affairs until 1360, was confirmed patron of Leiston Abbey, and he refounded and rebuilt it at a new site after the old abbey was ruined by flooding from the sea. The Countess Maud remained at Campsey for a further decade. A daughter of Maud de Chaworth, she laid down that alms should be given to her family's house of friars minor at Ipswich after the deaths of her chaplains. Wishing to avoid the many noble visitors, she caused herself to be enclosed at Campsey. Her daughter Elizabeth died in 1363. Lionel of Antwerp (by papal petition of John, King of France) thereupon refounded Bruisyard as a monastery for 13 or more nuns minoresses of St Clare, to be brought from Denny Abbey and elsewhere, under an abbess. Maud, professing to have loved the friars minor from childhood, entered the Order of St Clare and removed to Bruisyard Abbey: the transfer was complete by 1366. Emma Beauchamp was abbess by 1369 until at least 1390. Maud died in 1377 and was buried at the abbey.

=== Ufford mausoleum ===
Margaret, Countess of Suffolk, died in 1368 and was buried at Campsey Priory church under the arch between the chapel of St Nicholas and the high altar. Earl Robert made his will directing that he should be buried beside her, and died in the following year. His brother Sir Edmund de Ufford, whose wife Elizabeth had predeceased him, followed in 1375, and was buried beside her in the chapel of St Mary in the priory church. Floor-tiles bearing his arms, with a fleur-de-lys as a cadency mark for the sixth son, were found in the 1970 excavation. Maud de Ufford, a daughter of Earl Robert, was also a canoness at the priory. Robert's eldest surviving son, William de Ufford, 2nd Earl of Suffolk, before 1361 had married Joan Montague (daughter of Edward de Montacute and Alice de Brotherton), bringing him her inheritance of Framlingham Castle and her brother's barony. She died in 1375–76 and was buried at Campsey, probably with her young children who had recently died.

Earl William immediately remarried to Isabella, a daughter of Thomas de Beauchamp, 11th Earl of Warwick, and widow of John Lord Lestrange of Blackmere. In his will, proved in 1381/2, William de Ufford left substantial gifts to various monasteries and directed that he should be buried in a marble tomb in the priory's chapel of St Nicholas, behind his parents' tomb. He further deposed that, if he died without heir male, the sword given by King Edward III to his father with the title of Earl was to be offered at Campsey on the day of his burial, and was to remain there forever. In March 1381/2 Isabella made a religious vow of lifelong chastity at the high altar of Campsey Priory, before Thomas Bishop of Ely, various abbots and priors assisting, in the presence of Henry Bishop of Norwich, her brother the 12th Earl of Warwick, her husband's nephews Robert, 4th Lord Willoughby and Roger de Scales, 4th Baron Scales, many other knights and a large assembly.

Some insight into their monuments was gained by the discovery of two mutilated tomb effigies at St Gregory’s Church in Rendlesham in 1785. Both displayed arms referring to the marriage of Ufford and de Valoines. One was the figure of a woman beneath a crocketed canopy, probably of about 1325, suggesting identification with Cecily de Valoines, mother of the 1st Earl. The other was of an armoured man in mail gorget and jupon, worn in a style of the mid-14th century: a possible candidate for the 1st Earl himself. Re-used face-down as flooring slabs, they may have been brought from the priory nearby. The excavation of 1970 opened part of a south choir-aisle chapel of the lost priory church. At the site of a tomb chamber, slabs from the sides and end of a large Purbeck Marble tomb chest of the later 14th century were found, of very fine workmanship. The long sides had each formed nine panels with half pedestals and foliated canopies for mourner figures, the capitals of their columns sculpted with heads and small animals. Between the canopies were recesses for heraldic shields. This was possibly the tomb of the 2nd Earl. Fragments of carved armour and drapery were also discovered.

=== The chantry college refounded ===
The chaplains were still at Campsey in 1381, as Earl William's will shows, and in 1383 and 1390 Sir Roger de Boys and others, attorneys for the remainders of Edmund de Ufford, made two endowments to re-found the chantry college there, and to provide for two additional nuns. Statutes were set forth by Henry Bishop of Norwich in 1390 and approved by the prioress, Maria de Felton (daughter of Sir Thomas de Felton). A manse was to be built within the priory close, with common rooms, dormitory and refectory, to house five secular chaplains. They were to celebrate daily for the souls of Robert and William de Ufford and their wives in the chapel of St Thomas the Martyr, and were on no account to enter the cloister or nuns' quarters. The master, however, was to celebrate high mass at special feasts in the priory church. Maria de Felton died in 1394 and was succeeded as prioress by Margaret de Bruisyard.

As a vowess Isabella Countess of Suffolk continued to enjoy much of her husband's estate during her lifetime, and at her death in 1416 requested to be buried with him in the priory church. Isabella's first marriage to Lord le Strange reinforced the priory's long-standing endowments at Tottington in Norfolk, through the continuing series of charters by which Symon de Bruna and his daughter Katherine, and after them Sir John L'Estrange of Hunstanton (in the time of prioress Maria de Felton), and lastly his son John L'Estrange and his widow Eleanor in 1416 (in the time of prioress Alice Corbet), confirmed and made further grants there to Campsey Priory. Alice Corbet, installed in 1411, was succeeded as prioress in 1416 by Katherine Ancell.

== The late prioresses ==
The prioress Margery Rendlesham is recorded in 1446 and Margaret Hengham in 1477. The late years of the Priory are illuminated by the Visitations of the Bishops of Norwich. Bishop Goldwell, in his visitation of 1492, found all well with Prioress Katherine, subprioress Katherine Babyngton, and the eighteen other nuns. Their names, Mortimer, Jernyngham, Hervy, Blanerhasett, Jenney and Everard at once reveal the old gentry origins of the sisterhood. A prioress Anna is recorded in 1502, but little is known of her.

On 31 July 1514, having reprimanded canon Reginald Westerfield at Butley Priory for calling the junior canons "whoresons", Bishop Nykke spent the night at Campsey and saw the nuns on the following day. He found prioress Elizabeth Everard, her subprioress Petronilla Fulmerstoune, and the nineteen other sisters all most praiseworthy in temporal and spiritual affairs, and only asked them to make an inventory of their goods before he moved on to inspect Woodbridge Priory. Prioress Elizabeth Blenerhassett had succeeded by 1518. The schedule of the 1520 visit is missing, perhaps because nothing was found needing reform among the prioress and her twenty nuns.

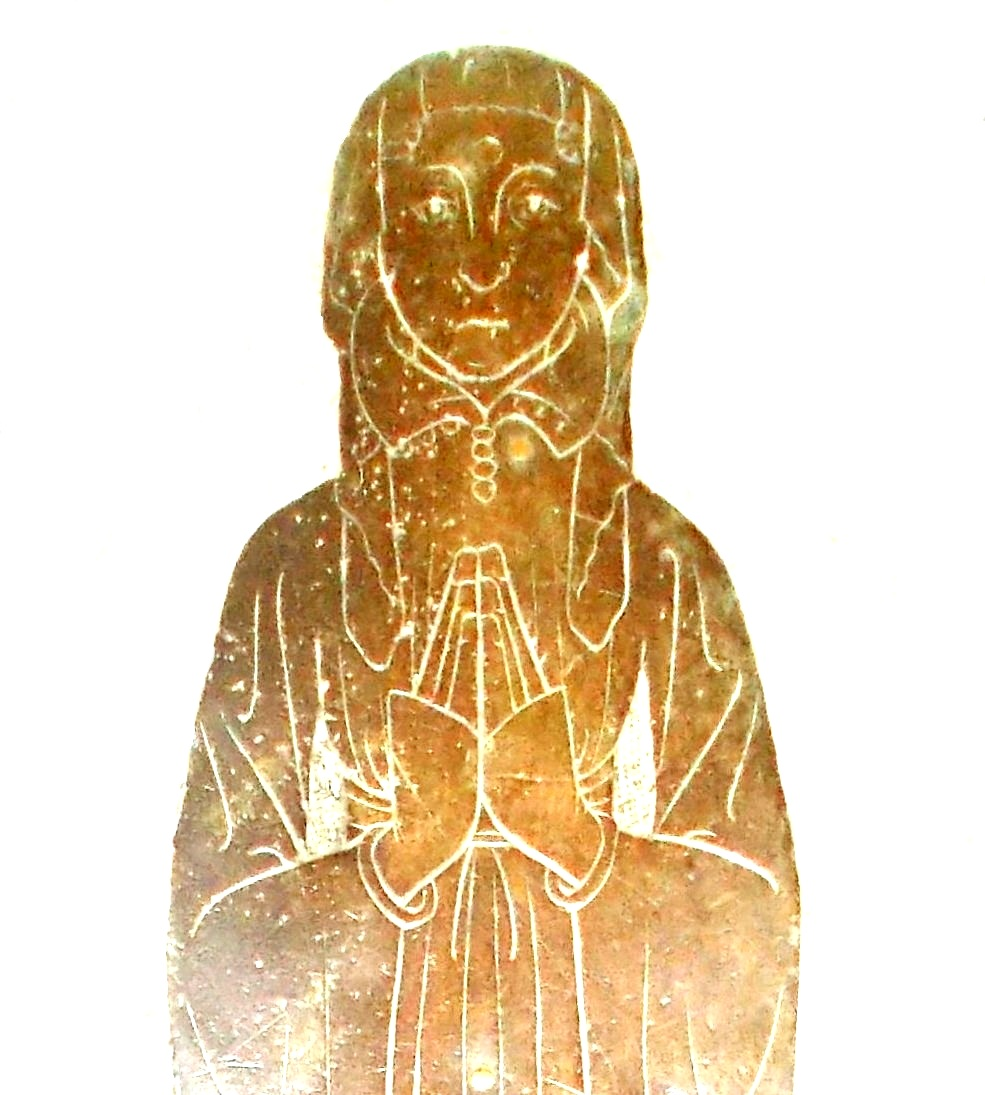
Elizabeth Buttry, last prioress of Campsey Priory

The last prioress of Campsey, Elizabeth Buttry, has her own special place in the priory's history. She had been a member of the community since before 1492, and like the others had raised no complaints when the bishop came. It is suggested that she was a descendant of the Lords of Botreaux, as that name was pronounced. In the Bishop's visitation, 27 June 1526, Barbara Jernyngham was her subprioress, and Margaret Harman, precentrix, went so far as to say that in 35 years she had never known anything to need correction except that the books in the choir might be mended. The prioress and her twenty nuns, who all said omnia bene, were told to mend the books and increase the number of nuns as far as possible.

By 1532, however, there were only 18 inmates, and the story had changed. Barbara Jernyngham was no longer sub-prioress, and said that all was well, as did Petronilla Felton, infirmarer and cellarer. But a chorus of voices complained that the prioress, while generous with her visitors, was very stingy towards the nuns, especially with their food. One had been kept waiting two hours for her dinner: several complained that the meat was unhealthy, and Katerina Grome said that if the bullock they had been fed had not been killed for the table it would have died anyway. For her part, the prioress remarked that the nuns spoke privately with the laity, to which Elizabeth Wingfield, chamberlain, responded that they were all forbidden to speak even to a graduate of the university, unless all were assembled together, and that her office was owed £5. Also that the nuns were not being paid their annual allowance of 6s 8d. from the bequest of William de Ufford.

== Suppression ==
Campsey Priory was not a poor house, and even with slightly diminished numbers its income, taken together with that of the chantry college within its precinct, should have been sufficient to protect it from the closure of the smaller monasteries in 1536. The Valor Ecclesiasticus of 1536 (which identifies Robert de Ufford as the founder) shows the extent of Campsey's temporalities and spiritualities in Suffolk. The commissioners' valuation however omitted the chantry college endowments of some £35 from the priory's income, assessed at a little over £182. As a result, the house fell victim to the first wave of suppression.

The inventory of the priory's goods was compiled by the commissioners, Sir Anthony Wingfield, Sir Humphrey Wingfield, Sir Thomas Russhe, Richard Southwell and Thomas Mildmay, on 29 August 1536. The last glimpse of the priory church shows the plate for the high altar, the parcel-gilt silver altar cross of 30 ounces, a censer of 28 ounces, a pax of two ounces, a chalice of 13 ounces and a silver gilt pyx of 9 ounces. There were also the altar cloth of white silk, four great latten candlesticks, a timber reredos with imagery, other lamps, an image of Our Lady, two cruets and an older Mass-book. The Lady Chapel had an alabaster reredos. In the vestry were five copes, one of crimson velvet with baudekin (a luxurious cloth), one of gold baudekin, one of violet silk, one of green silk with birds of copper gold, and one of blue with angels and stars. There were various other rich altar cloths and vestments. Other plate included a silver salt with cover, two form pieces, and a pair of chalices.

No other books are mentioned. The priory was adequately furnished with feather beds and bolsters, forms, tables, chairs, stools and settles, with a painted cloth hanging in the Steward's chamber. We hear also of the Draught chamber, the Auditor's chamber, the Chamber at the church door, the Parlour, the New Parlour, the Buttery, the Kitchen, the Pantry, and the Bakehouse and Brewhouse. There were 10 milch-kine and a bull, 10 old plough and cart horses and two draught oxen, 26 loads of hay, 25 quarters of wheat and a quarter of barley. The total value of goods was £56 13s. An indented copy of the inventory, the goods to be held in safe keeping for the king's use, was presented to Elizabeth Buttery. She died in 1546, and was buried in St Stephen's Church, Norwich, where she has a monumental brass memorial.

Other Suffolk monasteries to be visited by the commissioners in this year were Flixton Priory, St Olave's Priory, Redlingfield Priory, the Priory of the Holy Trinity, Ipswich, Ixworth Priory, Eye Priory, Leiston Abbey, Letheringham Priory and Blythburgh Priory.

=== Transition to domestic use ===
Henry VIII granted the site of Campsey Priory, with the demesne lands, the manor of Campsey, and the lands called Valeyns in Blaxhall, and various other lands formerly belonging to the priory, to Sir William Willoughby, later Lord Willoughby in 1543. (Willoughby had been, perhaps, the servant of Henry Fitzroy, illegitimate son of the King.) Two years later Lord Willoughby conveyed the manor and various other lands to John Some, by whom they were divided into moieties. In 1550 Lord Willoughby alienated the site of the nunnery, with its appurtenant lands in Campsea Ash, Wickham Market, Rendlesham and Loudham to John Lane, Esq.

The property passed through several hands, including those of Sir William Chapman, Baronet, High Sheriff of Suffolk for 1767. The site of the priory itself is now occupied by a farmhouse. Abbey House, a grade II* listed building standing near to the site of the nunnery, possibly incorporates in its fabric part of the living quarters of the chaplains.

== Burials ==
- Robert Ufford, 1st Earl of Suffolk
- William Ufford, 2nd Earl of Suffolk
- Christopher Willoughby, 10th Baron Willoughby de Eresby
