= Pettistree =

Village in Suffolk, England

Coordinates: 52.144°N 1.354°E

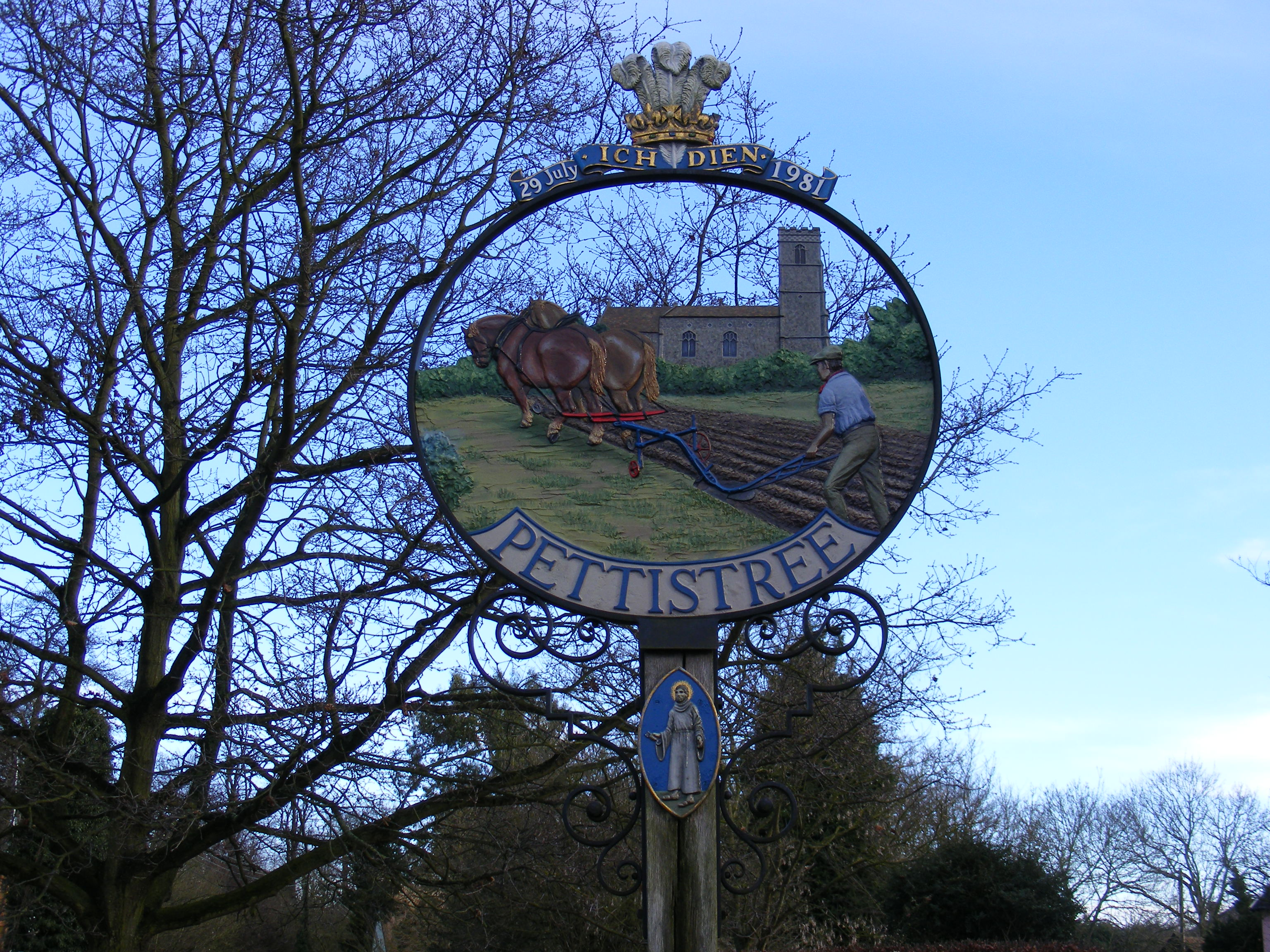
- Village Sign

- Location within Suffolk
- Population: 194 (2001)
- OS grid reference: TM 30510 53679
- District: East Suffolk
- Shire county: Suffolk
- Region: East
- Country: England
- Sovereign state: United Kingdom
- Post town: Woodbridge
- Postcode district: IP13
- Dialling code: 01728
- Police: Suffolk
- Fire: Suffolk
- Ambulance: East of England
- UK Parliament: Suffolk Coastal

Pettistree is a small village and a civil parish in the East Suffolk district, in the English county of Suffolk. According to the 2011 Census, Pettistree had a population of 194 people and is set in around 1,800 acres of farmland. The village has many footpaths and country lanes surrounding it. Being only one mile from the larger village of Wickham Market, Pettistree uses many of their resources; such as the Post Office, Medical and Resource Centre and Children's Play Area. The Primary School situated in Wickham Market also serves the younger children of Pettistree. However, senior children are required to travel 7 miles to Thomas Mills High School which is situated in Framlingham.

Pettistree House is a Georgian country manor house set in 13 acres of parkland. The civil parish of Pettistree comprises the manor of Pettistree, the manor of Byng, and the manor of Loudham. Byng Hall is a castellated 16th-century manor house. Loudham Hall is a fine Georgian country manor house set in 69 acres. The village church of St Peter and St Paul’s was originally built in the thirteenth Century. Pettistree is just south of the small town of Wickham Market. For transport there is the A12 road nearby.

In 1887, in the Gazetteer of the British Isles, John Bartholomew described Pettistree as

"Pettistree, par. and vil., Suffolk, 4 miles NE. of Woodbridge, 1767 ac., pop. 275; near the vil. is Pettistree lodge, seat"

== Demographics ==
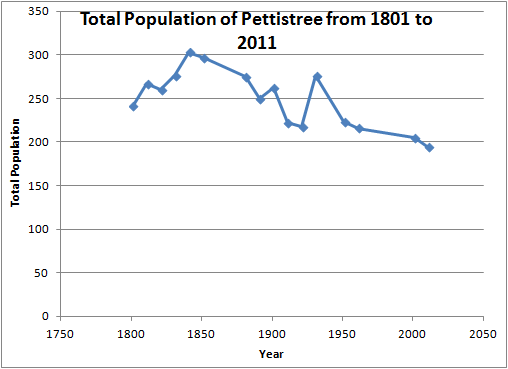
Population graph of Pettistree as reported by Census Data

=== Population ===
The earliest census statistics date back to 1801. At this time, Pettistree had a population of 241 people. The highest recorded population for the Parish was in 1841 with a population of 303 people. Since 1931 the population of the village has been decreasing. According to the 2011 United Kingdom census, Pettistree had a population of 194 people, of whom 100 people were male and 94 were female. In 2011, the average age of residents living in Pettistree was 43.2 years.

=== Occupation ===
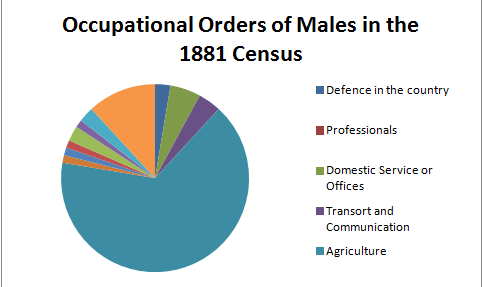
Occupation of Males in Pettistree as reported in the 1881 Census

The 1881 Census shows the occupational data of males of Pettistree; agriculture employed the greatest number of males with fifty men working in this industry. No men were considered to be professional. However, the 1881 Census was the first census to introduce women's occupations. One woman was considered a professional, twenty-five worked in Domestic Services or Offices, one was a dress worker whilst thirty-one women were not considered to have a specified occupation and a further seventeen women had an unknown occupation. The occupations of residents who live in Pettistree has changed over the years and in the 2011 Census there were 92 economically active residents and 55 economically inactive residents. However, 33 of the economically inactive residents were retired. The industry which employs the greatest number of people in Pettistree is Health and Social Work Activities with 12% of total residents working in this sector. In addition, the second most popular industry was Public Administration and Defence, employing a total of 10.9% of people. However, there were three sectors in which no residents were employed; they were Mining and Quarrying, Water Supply; Sewerage Waste Management and Remediation Activities and Gas, Electricity, Steam and Air Conditioning Supply.

=== Religion ===
Of all residents in the Parish 114 (58.8%) were Christian, just below the 2011 national average of 59.3% (33.2 million people). The second largest religious group in England, in 2011 were Muslims with 2.7 million people (4.8% of the population). Yet, in Pettistree, no residents were Muslim. Fifty-eight people (29.9%) of all residents stated that they practised no religion at all.

=== Housing ===
In total, there are 77 households in Pettistree. A majority of the houses are detached (60) with the remaining 17 houses being semi-detached. There are no terraced houses in the village. The overall average house price in Pettistree is £334,333, which is much higher than the UK average of £250,000 Of the 194 residents, 186 are permanent residents with the remaining eight households being Second homes.

== History ==
Before Christianity came to Pettistree, it is believed that people worshipped an ancient tree which was sacred to Odin. The first churches were built with the coming of missionaries from Rome and were dedicated to St Peter and St Paul, who were Patron Saints of Rome. The churches stood near the sacred tree and so this district "received the name of Peter's Tree or Pettistree. Over the years Pettistree has been spelt in various ways: Pedestree, Petestre, Petistre, Petistree, Petrestre, Petristrel, Petrystree, Pettitre, Pistre, Pistreye, Pitestrey, Pittistree". Edric the Grim and King Harold were the Lords of the Manor of Wickham and the hamlets of Pettistree, Bing, Loudham and Harpole before the Norman Conquest". Parts of Pettistree (Bing) are mentioned in the Domesday Book of 1086, although this was the ancient village. It is thought that the present village was a later development and was established due to a shifting population after one of the plagues attacked the ancient village. "The Old centres of population were found around Byng Hall Estate and Loudham Hall Estate. It is thought that Byng Hall is an old Roman settlement due to the brick kiln, pit and Roman tiles which were discovered in 1846. The green in front of the present Byng Hall was commonly known as Market Field; in 1253 Sir Roger de Huntingfield granted a market to be placed there.

== Present Day ==
Pettistree is described as a "civil parish/community" by MapItUK. The nearest railway station to Pettistree is Wickham Market and is situated at a distance of 3 1/2 miles from Pettistree. There are two buses which serve the village of Pettistree, these are the Number 63 Bus which runs from Ipswich to Framlingham and the Number 64 bus which runs from Ipswich to Aldeburgh. Neither bus runs on Sunday. Both Buses are operated by Eastern Counties Bus Operators.

== Churches ==
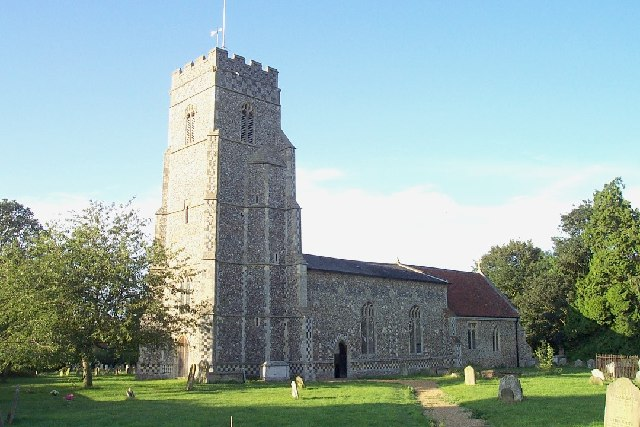
St Peter and St Paul’s Church, Pettistree

The Church of St Peter and St Paul was built in the 13th century. The original font base and the grisaille glass remains intact in the building. Although the original church was likely to have been low and towerless, this changed as the village become more wealthy. As the wealth of the settlement grew, Campsey Priory added both Loudham and Pettistree to its dependent parishes and the re-construction of the original church began in the 14th century. Again, further improvements were made to the church in the 15th century with the tower, bells, and benches for the congregation all being added. These improvements came with an increasing population. However, during the Reformation, many of these features were destroyed or defaced including the original stained-glassed windows. Due to Pettistree being a relatively small parish, it has never had its own parish priest and since the late 17th century it has been linked to both nearby Bredfield and Wickham Market.

The church underwent some restorations in the late 20th century; the original tower was restored in 1979 and then the bells in 1989 after being damaged in the Second World War. The "medieval glass in the chancel was restored in 1991 by Surinder Warboys and was dedicated to the Harvest Festival"- Suffolk Parish Council.

== Parish Council ==
Formed in 1970, Pettistree Parish Council was established by Mr W Frith, who was one of St Peter and St Paul’s Parishioners. Frith then acted as Parish Clerk for many years following. At that time there were only five members but in 1988 the membership increased to 7. The Parish Council deals with problems such as drainage, ditches and overall maintenance of the church. In the early years, the Council also discussed the building of the Wickham Market by-pass, which had been awaited for over 30 years. The Parish Council, through the Suffolk Coastal District Council, is able to collect a portion of Council Tax to fund village activities. The council acts on behalf of Pettistree's Community and is responsible for the maintenance of the village, including the village green, footpaths and bridleways. The Parish Council acts as the voice of the community, representing the residents’ views for things such as planning applications. The Annual Parish Meeting is usually held in late May or early June. Here, local electors are able to discuss any issues that they wish the Parish Council to focus and act upon in the next year.
