= Ufford family =

Medieval noble family in England

The arms of the Ufford family

The Ufford family was a prominent medieval English noble family with roots in Suffolk. Rising to prominence in the 13th and 14th centuries, the family held substantial lands in East Anglia and played a key role in national politics during the reigns of Edward III and Richard II.

The first to use the surname was Robert de Ufford, d. 1298, lord of the manor of Ufford, Suffolk, and father of Robert Ufford, 1st Baron Ufford (1279–1316), who was summoned to Parliament by writ of the king dated 13 January 1308, by which he is deemed to have become a baron. This 1st Baron Ufford was married to Cecily de Valoignes (died 1325), daughter and co-heiress of Sir Robert de Valoignes (died 1281) and Eva, widow of Nicholas Tregoz of Tolleshunt Tregoz.

His second but eldest surviving son Robert Ufford, 1st Earl of Suffolk (1298–1369), was the most notable member of the family. He served as a senior military commander and diplomat under Edward III and was created Earl of Suffolk in 1337. He had a younger brother, Sir Ralph Ufford (died 1346), Justiciar of Ireland, an energetic and capable but rather unpopular viceroy. His attitude to the Irish is said to have been influenced greatly by his wife, the King's cousin Maud of Lancaster.

Earl Robert's son, William Ufford, 2nd Earl of Suffolk (1338–1382), succeeded him but died without male heirs, leading to the extinction of the earldom in the Ufford line.

The Uffords held the Honour of Eye and resided at various estates in Suffolk. They were succeeded in prominence by the de la Pole family, who later assumed the Suffolk title.
