= Honour of Framlingham =

Medieval landholding in Suffolk, England

The Honour of Framlingham was a medieval landholding centred on Framlingham Castle in Suffolk, England. Originally held by the Bigod family, Earls of Norfolk, it later passed to the Ufford family, the de la Pole family, and eventually the Howard family, Dukes of Norfolk. The honour comprised numerous manors across Suffolk and was one of the most important baronial estates in East Anglia.

The honour was taken from the Howard Family and given to Mary Tudor who later used Framlingham Castle as her base in 1553 during her successful claim to the English throne. In 1613, Mary restored the estate to the Howard family, long-time Dukes of Norfolk and former holders of the Honour of Framlingham. The Howards retained the property into the 17th century until Theophilus Howard, 2nd Earl of Suffolk sold it in 1635 to Sir Robert Hitcham, a lawyer, MP, and alumnus of Pembroke College, Cambridge. Hitcham subsequently bequeathed the castle and its associated lands to Pembroke College after his death in 1636, instructing that the internal buildings be demolished, and for the college to establish charitable institutions for the poor in Framlingham.

The college still holds the estate. In 1864, part of the estate was donated for the foundation of Framlingham College, a public school established in memory of Prince Albert. Guardianship of the castle (manorial rights were retained) was transferred to the Ministry of Works in 1913. The guardianship was later transferred to English Heritage.
