= Charles Emeny =

English photographer

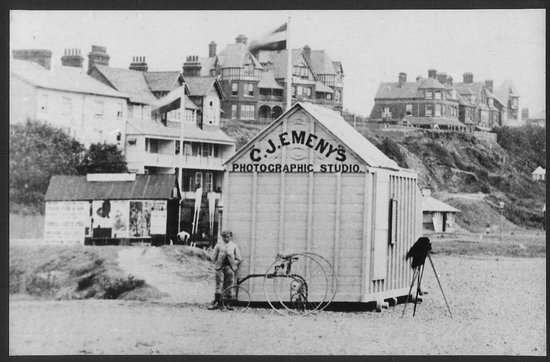
Emeney's Photographic Studio on Felixstowe beach, 1 January 1900

Charles Emeny (1846–1924) was an English photographer and postcard publisher based in Felixstowe, Suffolk from the late nineteenth century.

Charles Emeny was born in Wickham Market, the eldest child of James Emeny and Harriet Vince. However the family moved to Walton, now part of Felixstowe. Here he subsequently established his photography business.

Charles took his first photograph at the age of 16. By 1900 he had recorded nearly 3,000 photographs.

By 1911 his business was known as Emeny and Sons, as William (1875-1935) and Clement Emeny (1882-1955) who were also photographers had joined the firm.

In and Around Victorian Felixstowe. A collection of over 160 Victorian Photographs, 160 photographs by Charles Emeny selected by Charles Corker, was published in 1972.
