= William Ufford, 2nd Earl of Suffolk =

14th-century British nobleman

The Earl of Suffolk
- Earl of Suffolk
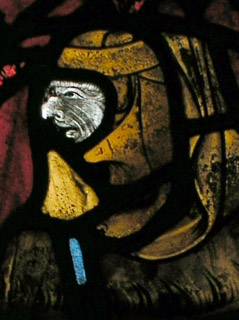
- William Ufford, from a stained glass window in St Andrews church in Wimpole
- Tenure: 1369–1382
- Predecessor: Robert Ufford, 1st Earl of Suffolk
- Successor: Extinct
- Other titles: Lord Ufford
- Years active: Bef. 1367–1382
- Born: 30 May 1338
- Died: 15 February 1382 (aged 43); Westminster Hall, London
- Buried: Campsey Priory, Campsea Ashe, Suffolk
- Residence: Orford Castle
- Locality: East Anglia
- Net worth: c. £2–3,000 p.a.
- Wars and battles: Hundred Years' War • Battle of Poitiers; Peasants' Revolt
- Offices: Admiral of the North
- Spouses: (1) Joan Montagu (bef. 1361–bef. 1376) (2) Isabel Beauchamp (married bef. 1376)
- Parents: Robert Ufford, 1st Earl of Suffolk; Margaret Norwich

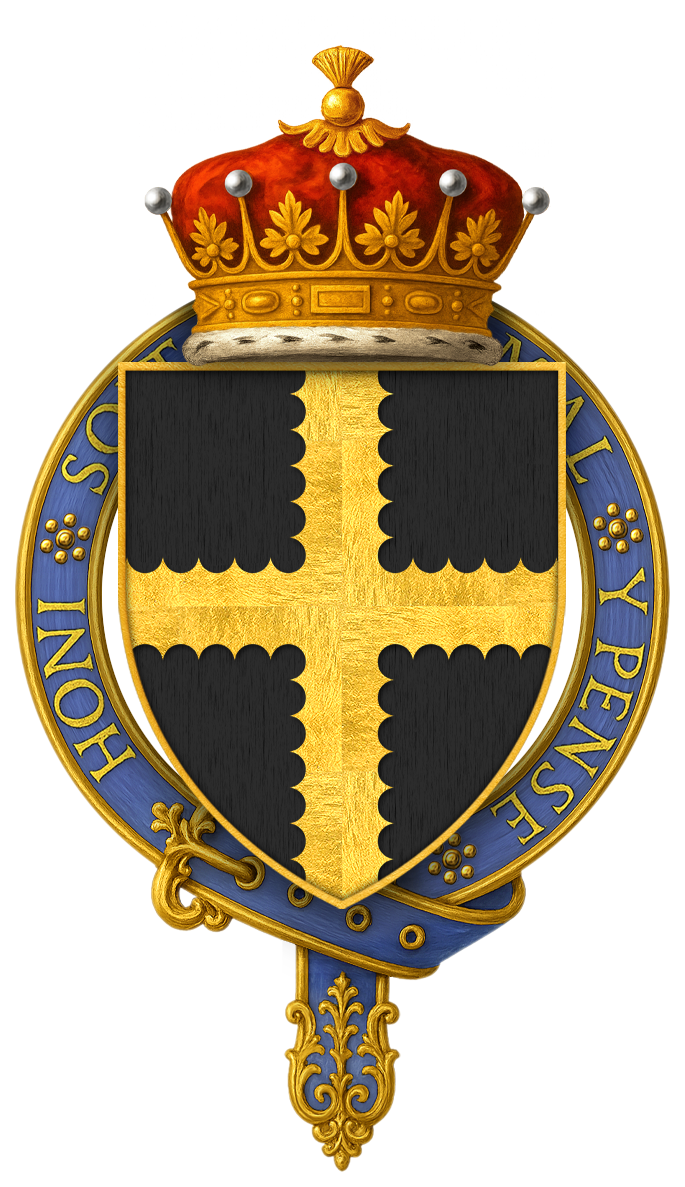
Garter-encircled Arms of William d'Ufford, 2nd Earl of Suffolk, KG, viz: "Sable a cross engrailed Or."

William Ufford, 2nd Earl of Suffolk KG (30 May 1338 – 15 February 1382) was an English nobleman in the reigns of Edward III and Richard II. He was the son of Robert Ufford, who was created Earl of Suffolk by Edward III in 1337. William had three older brothers who all predeceased him, and in 1369 he succeeded his father.

In the 1370s, he participated in several campaigns of the Hundred Years' War, but this period was not a successful one for England. Suffolk was closely connected to Thomas Beauchamp, Earl of Warwick and John of Gaunt, Duke of Lancaster, and his conciliatory skills were highly valued in national politics. He helped arbitrate in the conflict between Gaunt and the parliamentary Commons during the Good Parliament.

In 1381, Suffolk took part in suppressing the Peasants' Revolt in East Anglia, after narrowly escaping the rebels himself. He died suddenly in 1382 while attending parliament, and since he had no surviving children, his title became extinct and his property was dispersed.

== Early life ==
William's father Robert, the first Ufford Earl of Suffolk, was a close associate of King Edward III and a trusted military commander in the early stages of the Hundred Years' War. His military career included the Battle of Crécy, the siege of Calais and the Battle of Poitiers, where he greatly distinguished himself. In 1324, Robert married Margaret, daughter of Walter Norwich, Treasurer of the Exchequer, expanding his already substantial territorial holdings in East Anglia.

Little is known of William's early years. He was the fourth son of the family, and up until three years before his father died, he still had two surviving older brothers. For this reason, his early biography is based largely on conjecture. It is known that he managed to establish an independent position for himself through a fortunate marriage. By 1361 he was married to Joan Montagu, the daughter of Alice of Norfolk, and – through Alice – a granddaughter of Thomas of Brotherton, a younger son of Edward I. The first recorded evidence for his military activity dates from 1367, but he was probably also present in earlier campaigns. His father campaigned in France in 1355–56 and 1359–60, and it is likely that William also took part in these expeditions, along with Thomas Beauchamp, the future Earl of Warwick. The two men would develop a close affinity, and their careers were strikingly similar: they were born around the same time, they were probably knighted together in July 1355, neither was born as heir to their earldoms but came to their titles through the death of older brothers, and both succeeded their fathers in 1369.

== Service to Edward III ==
In the autumn of 1367, William Ufford and Thomas Beauchamp were going overseas, probably on a crusade to Prussia. On 4 November 1369, William's father died, shortly after his oldest son Robert, who was childless. William, who was now the heir of the family, was invested with the earldom of Suffolk soon after.

As earl of Suffolk he participated in several campaigns in the rather unsuccessful stage of the Hundred Years' War in the 1370s, along with Beauchamp, who had recently become Earl of Warwick. They escorted King Charles II of Navarre to and from Cherbourg for his visit to England in 1370. In 1372, they were summoned by King Edward III for an abortive expedition to France, and in 1373–74, they accompanied the king's son John of Gaunt, Duke of Lancaster, on the prince's fruitless chevauchée from Calais to Bordeaux. In 1375 or 1376, the Order of the Garter was bestowed on Suffolk. Also around this time, the relationship between the earls of Suffolk and Warwick was strengthened further. Suffolk's first wife Joan must have died at some unknown point before 1376, when he married Isabel, Warwick's sister.

Suffolk's connection with John of Gaunt was strong, a family connection that went back to the times of Suffolk's father. Suffolk's second wife Isabel had a daughter from a previous marriage, who was in Gaunt's wardship. This daughter, Elizabeth, who was an heiress of Lord Strange, was probably transferred to Isabel's household at her marriage to Suffolk. The two lords also maintained some of the same men as servants, or retainers.

At the Good Parliament in 1376, Suffolk was elected to a committee that would discuss the parliament's grievances concerning the failed fiscal and military policies of Gaunt, who was the de facto ruler of England. In spite of his association with Gaunt, the parliament trusted Suffolk's neutrality and equality in such a position. After parliament disbanded, Suffolk attended a lavish dinner given by the House of Commons, where Gaunt was conspicuously absent.

== Service to Richard II ==
The arms of the Ufford family

Edward III died in 1377 and was succeeded by his ten-year-old grandson, Richard II. At Richard's coronation, Suffolk carried the new king's sceptre, and he was later appointed to Richard's minority council. Even after the council was disbanded in January 1380, he remained a central figure at court, participating in the negotiations for the king's marriage to Anne of Bohemia, and mediating in a conflict between John of Gaunt and Henry Percy, Earl of Northumberland.

Suffolk was the dominant magnate in the East Anglia region. When the region's peasants revolted in 1381, he became a central figure in their repression. While in Bury St Edmunds, he was taken by surprise by the rebels while eating dinner. The rebel leader, Geoffrey Litster, attempted to force Suffolk to join the rebellion, hoping to lend legitimacy to the cause. When this failed, Litster turned to other prominent men. Suffolk then fled disguised as a groom, reaching London by way of St Albans. He soon returned to Bury with a force of 500 lances, and met little resistance. Much of the work suppressing the rebellion had been undertaken by Henry Despenser, Bishop of Norwich, leaving Suffolk to apprehend the remaining rebels for trial. In the rebellion Suffolk suffered financially: the peasants plundered property worth £1,000 from his castle at Mettingham.

== Death and dispersal of estates ==
On 15 February 1382, Suffolk attended parliament at Westminster Hall. As he ascended the stairs to the chamber where the lords had retired, he fell down and died instantly. According to Walsingham, Suffolk was an amiable man, much liked by all layers of society, and the news of his death was received with great sadness. Politically, he was a conciliatory person, and this quality had facilitated reconciliation in situations such as Gaunt's conflict with parliament or the quarrel between Gaunt and Percy. He was buried in his family's traditional burial place Campsey Priory, an Augustinian nunnery in Campsea Ashe, Suffolk.

William Ufford's first marriage, to Joan Montagu, brought him significant land holdings in Norfolk. With Joan he had at least five children, none of whom survived him, and his second marriage, to Isabel, was apparently childless. The lands he had acquired through Joan were reunited with the earldom of Norfolk, while his patrimony reverted to the crown. According to the late earl's will, much of the Suffolk lands – though not the title – descended on the Willoughby family, who were connected to the Uffords through marriage. In 1385, the earldom of Suffolk was restored for Michael de la Pole, who received a great portion of Ufford's lands to support his title.

== Sources ==
- Cokayne, George (1910–1959). The Complete Peerage of England, Scotland, Ireland, Great Britain and the United Kingdom. Vol. xii (New ed.). London: The St. Catherine Press. pp. 432–4.
- Dobson, R.B., ed. (1970). The Peasants' Revolt of 1381. London: Macmillan. ISBN 0-333-09139-6.
- Given-Wilson, Chris (1996). The English Nobility in the Late Middle Ages. London: Routledge. ISBN 0-415-14883-9.
- Goodman, Anthony (1992). John of Gaunt: The Exercise of Princely Power in Fourteenth-Century Europe. New York: St. Martin's Press. ISBN 0-582-50218-7.
- Harriss, Gerald (2005). Shaping the Nation: England, 1360–1461. Oxford: Oxford University Press. ISBN 0-19-822816-3.
- Hicks, Michael (2004). "Willoughby family (per. c. 1300 – 1523)". Oxford Dictionary of National Biography (online ed.). Oxford University Press. doi:10.1093/ref:odnb/52801. (Subscription, Wikipedia Library access or UK public library membership required.)
- McKisack, May (1959). The Fourteenth Century: 1307–1399. Oxford: Oxford University Press. ISBN 0-19-821712-9.
- Ormrod, W.M. (1990). The Reign of Edward III. New Haven and London: Yale University Press. p. 24. ISBN 0-300-04876-9.
- Ormrod, W.M. (2004). "Ufford, Robert, first earl of Suffolk (1298–1369)". Oxford Dictionary of National Biography (online ed.). Oxford University Press. doi:10.1093/ref:odnb/27977. (Subscription, Wikipedia Library access or UK public library membership required.)
- Saul, Nigel (1997). Richard II. New Haven: Yale University Press. ISBN 0-300-07003-9.
- Thompson, Benjamin (2004). "Ufford, William, second earl of Suffolk (c. 1339 – 1382)". Oxford Dictionary of National Biography (online ed.). Oxford University Press. doi:10.1093/ref:odnb/27978. (Subscription, Wikipedia Library access or UK public library membership required.) The first edition of this text is available at Wikisource: Lee, Sidney, ed. (1899). "Ufford, William de" . Dictionary of National Biography. Vol. 58. London: Smith, Elder & Co.
- Tuck, Anthony (2004). Beauchamp, Thomas, twelfth earl of Warwick (1337x9–1401). 1841.
- Walsingham, Thomas (2002). John Taylor; Wendy R. Childs; Leslie Watkiss (eds.). The St Albans Chronicle: The Chronica Maiora of Thomas Walsingham. Oxford: Clarendon. ISBN 0-19-820471-X.

Peerage of England
Preceded by Robert Ufford	Earl of Suffolk; 1369–1382	Extinct
