= Honour (England) =

In medieval England, an honour or honor was a conventional name for large feudal land holdings; it was typically held by a tenant-in-chief to the crown. In England an honour could also be called a barony.

== Composition ==
It could consist of a great lordship, with a significant castle as its caput baroniae, and more than about 20 knight's fees (each loosely equivalent to a manor) although some honours had hundreds of manors. A lordship could consist of anything from a field to vast territories all over England. Thus the designation honour can distinguish the large lordship from the small. The term has particular usefulness for the eleventh and twelfth centuries, before the development of an extensive peerage hierarchy.

The typical honour had properties scattered over several shires; the land holdings were intermingled with the properties of others. This was a specific policy of the Norman kings, to avoid establishing any one area under the control of a single lord. Usually, though, a more concentrated cluster of lands did exist somewhere, and it was usually there that would be found the caput (head) of the honour, with a castle that gave its name to the honour, and hosted the court of the honour, and served as its administrative headquarters or seat. The Leges Henrici Primi stated that tenants of an honour would have to go to the caput of the Lord, even if it was in another county.

Holders of honours (and the kings to whom they reverted by escheat) often attempted to preserve the integrity of an honour over time, administering its properties as a unit, maintaining inheritances together, and so on.

== Courts ==
The honour court, also known as the curia ducis ("duke's court") or curia militum ("soldiers' court"), was made up of the most important of a lord's tenants, particularly those who owed him knight service. Unlike other types of manorial court, its jurisdiction was not limited to a specific manor, but could extend over all the manors in the honour. Dealing as it did with the most important of the lord's tenants it was initially the principal manorial court, and may have acted as a superior court of appeal for the lower manorial courts, at least until 1267.

== Usage ==
The term, widely used in Europe, was first used in England to indicate that an estate gave its holder honour, dignity and status.

For a person to say "on my honour" was not just an affirmation of his or her integrity and rank; the phrase indicated that a pledgor held—and was willing to offer up—estates to back up their pledge or guarantee.

England was seen as the King's honour.

== Traditional mediaeval honours ==
Traditional mediaeval property-based honours in England included:

- Honour of Chester
- Honour of Clitheroe
- Honour of Clare
- Honour of Eye
- Honour of Framlingham
- Honour of Giffard
- Honour of Gloucester
- Honour of Grafton
- Honour of Holderness
- Honour of Lancaster
- Honour of Mowbray
- Honour of Peverel
- Honour of Pontefract
- Honour of Richmond
- Honour of Wallingford, circa 1066 to 1540

== Notes ==
=== Sources ===
- Mulholland, Maureen (2002), "The Jury in English Manorial Courts", in Cairns, John; McLeod, Grant (eds.), The Dearest Birth Right of the People of England: The Jury in the History of the Common Law, Hart Publishing, pp. 63–74, ISBN 978-1-84113-325-6
- Mulholland, Maureen (2003), "Trials in Manorial Courts in Late Medieval England", in Mulholland, Maureen; Pullan, Brian (eds.), The Trial in History: England and Europe from the Thirteenth to the Seventeenth Century, Manchester University Press, pp. 81–101, ISBN 978-0-7190-6342-8
