= Bruisyard Abbey =

Monastery in Bruisyard, Suffolk, England

Coordinates: 52.24454°N 1.41775°E

Bruisyard Hall, built out of the remains of the conventual buildings.

The Abbey of Bruisyard was a house of Minoresses (Poor Clares) at Bruisyard in Suffolk. It was founded from Campsey Priory in Suffolk on the initiative of Maud of Lancaster, Countess of Ulster, assisted by her son-in-law Lionel of Antwerp, in 1364–1366.

The foundation of a religious house at Rokes Hall in Bruisyard began a little earlier, when a small college of secular priests (four chaplains and a master, or warden) attached to Campsey Priory for the purposes of a chantry, established in 1346–1347, was moved to Bruisyard in 1354 to celebrate there in a new chapel of the Annunciation to the Virgin. At that time a full set of statutes was promulgated by Maud of Lancaster.

It was following the death of her daughter Elizabeth de Burgh, 4th Countess of Ulster in 1363 that Lionel of Antwerp, Duke of Clarence assisted in the refoundation of the house as a nunnery of the Order of St Clare, and at that time Maud of Lancaster, who had become a canoness at Campsey, transferred to the Poor Clares and spent her last years at Bruisyard. She and her daughter Maud de Ufford were buried there.

The house was suppressed on 17 February 1539, as part of the Dissolution of the Monasteries.
