= Benjamin Whitney =

Benjamin Whitney (1744–11 December 1821) served as a Clerk of the peace and acted as a Regency-era steward for several members of the British nobility, notably for Archibald Acheson, 2nd Earl of Gosford, from around 1813 to 1821.

== Early life ==
Benjamin Whitney was born in 1744 in Great Houghton, Northamptonshire, England, and was the only son of Thomas Whitney and Alice Hill.

== Career ==
Whitney received legal training, and his early career begins with him becoming a Clerk of the peace for Suffolk and steward for Sir John Blois of Cockfield Hall, Yoxford, around 1772. This was some time after Sir John inherited the estates of Grundisburgh and Cockfield upon the death of his father, Sir Ralph in 1762.

Later, Whitney assumed the role of steward for Robert Sparrow of Worlingham Hall, a prominent landowner and politician who represented Bedford in the House of Commons in 1775, and subsequently served as the High Sheriff of Suffolk in 1777–78. Robert Sparrow inherited the Worlingham Hall estate, initially spanning 250 acres in 1755, but it later expanded to 2800 acres by 1765 following the passing of his father, also named Robert.

In 1803, Whitney took on an employee named Henry Read of Cratfield, Suffolk, due to his expertise in mathematics, as Whitney had been requested to conduct a valuation of the estate near Kelvedon, Essex, belonging to Brigadier General Robert Bernard Sparrow of Brampton Park, Huntingdon. During this period, the British aristocracy sought revaluations of their estates to bolster their income, necessary to support the funding of the Napoleonic Wars. After conducting the revaluation of the estate near Kelvedon for the General, Whitney was tasked with assessing all of the General's estates in Huntingdon, the Isle of Ely, and Essex. These estates had been inherited by the General in 1789 upon the death of his uncle, Sir Robert Bernard, 5th Baronet, through his mother. Whitney and Read compiled a comprehensive book detailing every aspect of the estates for the General, which received approval from both him and his father, Robert Sparrow of Worlingham Hall.

Once the evaluation of General Sparrow's estates was finished, shortly thereafter, Lord Wodehouse, elected to the House of Commons for Great Bedwyn in 1796, a seat he held until 1802, reached out to Whitney. He tasked Whitney with assessing and leasing a significant portion of the Kimberley estate. This arrangement came about through a recommendation from Mr. Sparrow, who, in a letter to Whitney, urged him to bring Read along. After dedicating a number of weeks to this task and subsequently leasing the farms, Whitney and Read returned briefly to Sir John Blois' estate at Yoxford, albeit only for a few days.

Someone had mentioned Whitney to Colonel William Harbord of Blickling Hall, a Member of Parliament for Ludgershall (1790–1796) and colonel of a fencible cavalry regiment, the Norfolk Fencible Light Dragoons (1794), and Whitney and Read leased out around 4000 acres a year for him. This prompted his father, Sir Lord Suffield of Gunton Hall to engage the services of Whitney and Read, resulting in Whitney securing leases, perhaps even surpassing previous achievements, on his behalf. The Colonel later succeeded his father, Sir Harbord, as Lord Suffield in February 1810.

So popular did Whitney become that by 1805 the following Estates were all under his stewardship:

- Sir John Blois's Cockfield Hall estate, Yoxford, Suffolk
- Robert Sparrow's Esq. Worlingham Hall estate, Suffolk
- Lord Wodehouse's Kimberley estate, Norfolk
- General Sparrow's Huntingdonshire and Essex estates
- Admiral Sir Eliab Harvey's Chigwell estate, Essex
- Chaloner Arcedeckne's Glevering Hall estate by Wickham Market, Suffolk

In 1805, General Sparrow died and his widow Lady Olivia Acheson, eldest daughter of Arthur Acheson, 1st Earl of Gosford, whom he married in 1797, inherited his estates in fee. Upon his death, Whitney continued as steward for the General's estates on behalf of Lady Olivia.

In 1805, Archibald Acheson, 2nd Earl of Gosford (1776–1849), married Mary Sparrow, only daughter and heiress of Robert Sparrow of Worlingham Hall.

Upon recommendation of Robert Sparrow of Worlingham Hall, Whitney became steward for the Earl's estate in 1813 until 1821.

== Marriage and children ==
Around 1769, Whitney married Elizabeth Bate (1745–1825). Elizabeth was the daughter of the Reverend Richard Bate and Ann Miles.

Benjamin and Elizabeth had three children:

- William Whitney, born 1770 in Great Houghton, Northamptonshire and died an infant in 1770.
- Benjamin Whitney Jr., born in 1772 in Yoxford, Suffolk. Benjamin Jnr married Sarah Smith (1777–1820).
- John Whitney, born 1775 in Yoxford, Suffolk.

== Death ==
Benjamin died on 11 December 1821 at Yoxford, Suffolk. Executors of his will were Archibald Acheson, 2nd Earl of Gosford, and Robert Sparrow of Worlingham Hall, Esq. After Whitney's death, Henry Read became the Earl's steward based on the recommendation of Sir John Blois' heir, Sir Charles, for whom Read had served as steward since Whitney and Sir Charles suggested him in 1813.
