= Bruisyard =

Village in Suffolk, England

Coordinates: 52.24596°N 1.407344°E

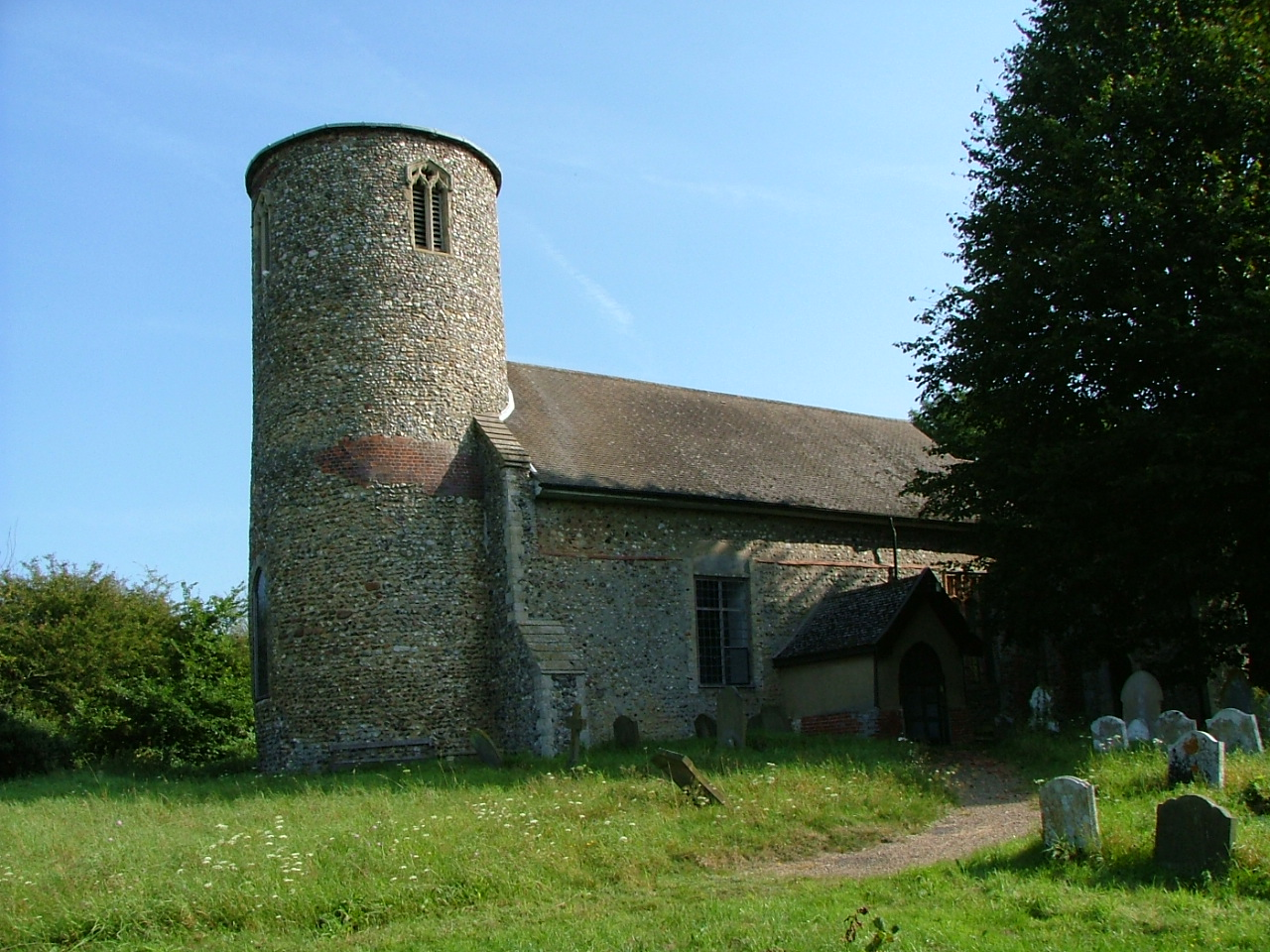
- St Peter's Church

- Location within Suffolk
- Population: 175 (2011)
- District: East Suffolk
- Shire county: Suffolk
- Region: East
- Country: England
- Sovereign state: United Kingdom
- Post town: Saxmundham
- Postcode district: IP17
- Dialling code: 01728
- Police: Suffolk
- Fire: Suffolk
- Ambulance: East of England
- UK Parliament: Central Suffolk and North Ipswich

Bruisyard is a village in the valley of the River Alde in the county of Suffolk, England. The village had a population of around 175 at the 2011 census.

Bruisyard's name appears in the Domesday Book of 1086 as Buresiart. The name is believed to be derived from the Anglo-Saxon term, gebūres geard, meaning "peasant's yard or enclosure" and is pronounced 'Br-ews-yard'.

== Abbey and Hall ==
The Manor House of Rokes Hall was converted in 1364 into an nunnery of the Poor Clares, founded by Lionel, Duke of Clarence. Bruisyard Abbey was seized in 1539 by the crown at the Dissolution of the Monasteries under Henry VIII. An Elizabethan manor house, Bruisyard Hall, was built on the site, incorporating some of the older buildings.

== St Peter's church ==
The village church is a Grade I listed building and dates to at least Saxon times. The church is an example of a round-tower church, rare in England as a whole, but most common in East Anglia. Pevsner dates the windows in the nave and south chapel to the early 16th century. During renovation work undertaken in 2017, medieval wall paintings were uncovered and have now been preserved.

== Village Hall ==
The construction of a new village hall on the Parish Park was completed in December 2009 with support from many funding bodies, including the Big Lottery Fund. The village hall was formally opened in July 2010. The hall has a stained glass window by the artist Sharon McMullin depicting the local flora and fauna, and nine low-relief plaster panels by the sculptor Anne Smith showing past and present local scenes. The central panel shows the Domesday Book entry for Bruisyard (Buresiart).

The village sign commissioned by the Parish Council in 2004 and made by the sculptor Anne Smith depicts Saint Clare of the Order of the Poor Clares.

A vineyard in Bruisyard closed in 2002.
