= Mass-book =

A mass-book is a book, used most commonly by the laity, as an aid while attending Catholic Mass (the principal Catholic church service). The massbook comprises scriptural readings, prayers, and psalms for the day's mass, sometimes also including homiletic or exegetical material.
