= Robert Ufford, 1st Earl of Suffolk =

English peer

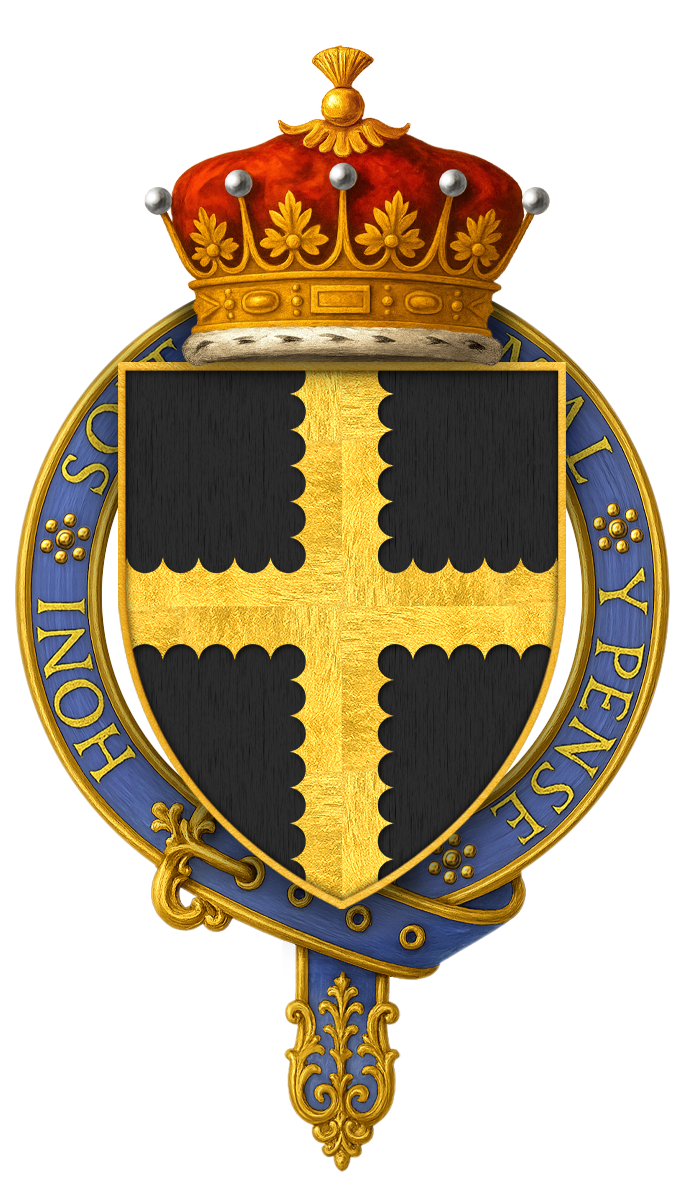
Arms of Sir Robert Ufford, 1st Earl of Suffolk, KG

Robert Ufford, 1st Earl of Suffolk, KG (9 August 1298 – 4 November 1369) was an English peer. He was created Earl of Suffolk in 1337.

== Early life ==
Born 9 August 1298, Robert Ufford was the second but eldest surviving son of Robert Ufford, 1st Baron Ufford (1279–1316), lord of the manor of Ufford, Suffolk, who was summoned to Parliament by writ of the king dated 13 January 1308, by which he is deemed to have become a baron. His mother was Cecily de Valoignes (died 1325), daughter and co-heiress of Sir Robert de Valoignes (died 1281) and Eva, widow of Nicholas Tregoz of Tolleshunt Tregoz. He had a younger brother, Sir Ralph Ufford (died 1346), Justiciar of Ireland, an energetic and capable but rather unpopular viceroy. His attitude to the Irish is said to have been influenced greatly by his wife, the King's cousin Maud of Lancaster.

On 19 May 1318 he had livery of his father's Suffolk lands. He was knighted and received some official employments, being occupied, for example, in 1326 in levying ships for the royal use in Suffolk, and serving in November 1327 on a commission of the peace in the eastern counties under the statute of Winchester. In May and June 1329 he attended the young Edward III on his journey to Amiens.

He was employed on state affairs down to the end of the rule of Isabella of France and Roger Mortimer, 1st Earl of March, and, on 1 May 1330, received a grant for life of Orford Castle in Suffolk, which had been previously held by his father; he also obtained grants of other lands. On 28 July he was appointed to array and command the levies of Norfolk and Suffolk summoned to fight "against the king's rebels". Nevertheless, in October he associated himself with William de Montacute in the attack on Mortimer at Nottingham. He took part in the capture of Mortimer in Nottingham Castle, and was implicated in the deaths of Sir Hugh de Turplington and Richard de Monmouth that occurred during the scuffle; that on 12 February 1331 he received a special pardon for the homicide. He was rewarded by the grant of the manors of Cawston and Fakenham in Norfolk, and also of some houses in Cripplegate that had belonged to Mortimer's associate, John Maltravers, succeeding Maltravers in some posts. He was summoned as a baron to parliament on 27 January 1332. From that time he was one of the most trusted warriors, counsellors, and diplomats in Edward III's service.

== Earl of Suffolk ==
On 1 November 1335 Ufford was appointed a member of an embassy empowered to treat with the Scots. He then served in a campaign against them, and was made warden of Bothwell Castle. On 14 January 1337 he was made Admiral of the North; Ufford ceased to hold this office later in the year. In March he was created Earl of Suffolk, and was granted lands. During his absence in parliament the Scots retook Bothwell Castle.

== Hundred Years' War ==
In opening moves of the Edwardian War, Suffolk was sent on 3 October 1337, with Henry Burghersh, the Earl of Northampton, and Sir John Darcy, to treat for peace or a truce with the French. Further powers were given them to deal with Louis IV, Holy Roman Emperor and other allies, and on 7 October they were also commissioned to treat with David Bruce, then staying in France, and were accredited to the two cardinals sent by the pope to make an Anglo-French reconciliation. Next year, on 1 July, Suffolk was associated with John de Stratford and others on an embassy to France, and left England along with the two cardinals sent to treat for peace. He attended the king in Brabant, serving in September 1339 in the expedition that besieged Cambrai, and in the army that prepared to fight a major battle at Buironfosse that came to nothing, where he and the Earl of Derby held a joint command. On 15 November of the same year he was appointed joint ambassador to Louis I, Count of Flanders and the Flemish estates, to treat for an alliance.

After Edward's return to England, Suffolk stayed behind with Salisbury, in garrison at Ypres. During Lent 1340 they attacked the French near Lille, pursued the enemy into the town, were made prisoners and were sent to Paris. Philip VI of France, it was said, wished to kill them, and they were spared only through the intervention of John of Bohemia. The truce of 25 September 1340 provided for the release of all prisoners, but it was only after a heavy ransom, to which Edward III contributed, that Suffolk was freed. He took part in a tournament at Dunstable in the spring of 1342 and at great jousts in London. He was one of the members of Edward's Round Table at Windsor, which assembled in February 1344, and fought in a tournament at Hertford in September 1344. He was one of the early members of Order of the Garter.

Suffolk served through the English intervention in the Breton War of Succession during July 1342, and at the siege of Rennes. In July 1343 he was joint ambassador to Pope Clement VI at Avignon. On 8 May 1344 he was appointed captain and admiral of the northern fleet, and on 3 July accompanied Edward on a short expedition to Flanders. He continued admiral in person or deputy until March 1347, when he was succeeded by Sir John Howard. On 11 July 1346 Suffolk sailed with the king from Portsmouth on the invasion of France which resulted in the battle of Crécy. On the retreat northwards, a day after the passage of the River Seine, Suffolk and Sir Hugh le Despenser defeated a French force. Suffolk was one of those who advised Edward to select the field of Crécy as his battle-ground; in the English victory he fought in on the left wing. Next morning, 27 August, he took part in the Earl of Northampton's reconnaissance that resulted in a sharp fight with the unbroken remnant of the French army.

Suffolk's diplomatic activity went on. He was one of the commissioners appointed to treat with France on 25 September 1348, and with Flanders on 11 October. The negotiations were conducted at Calais. On 10 March 1349, and again on 15 May 1350, he had similar commissions. On 29 August 1350 he fought in the naval victory, the Battle of Winchelsea. In May 1351 and in June 1352 he was chief commissioner of array in Norfolk and Suffolk.

== Poitiers campaign ==
In September 1355 Suffolk sailed with The Black Prince, to Aquitaine. Between October and December he was on the prince's raid through Languedoc to Narbonne, where he commanded the rear-guard, William de Montacute, 2nd Earl of Salisbury, serving with him. After his return he was quartered at Saint-Emilion, his followers being stationed round Libourne. In January 1356 he led another foray, towards Rocamadour. Suffolk also shared in the Black Prince's northern foray of 1356, and in the battle of Poitiers which resulted from it, where he commanded, with Salisbury, the third "battle" or the rearward. The Prince's attempted retreat over the Miausson, threw the brunt of the first fighting on Suffolk and Salisbury. On the march back to Bordeaux he led the vanguard.

== Last years ==
Now 58 years old, Suffolk took part in the expedition into the County of Champagne in 1359. After that he was employed only in embassies, the last of those on which he served being that commissioned on 8 February 1362 to negotiate the proposed marriage of Edmund of Langley to the daughter of the Count of Flanders.

In his declining years Suffolk devoted himself to the removal of Leiston Abbey, near Saxmundham, to a new site somewhat further inland. In 1363 it was transferred to its new home, where some ruins remain.

== Death ==
Suffolk died on 4 November 1369. By his will he requested burial beneath the arch between the chapel of St Nicholas and the high altar of the church of Campsey Priory, where his wife was also buried. His monument, much mutilated, is believed to have survived the destruction of the priory and to have been rediscovered in nearby Rendlesham churchyard in 1785 by the Rev. Samuel Henley.

== Family ==
In 1314 he married Margaret de Norwich (died 2 April 1368), daughter of Sir Walter de Norwich (died 1329), Treasurer of the Exchequer, and Katherine de Hedersete, by whom he had a large family, including:

- Robert Ufford, who predeceased his father without issue.
- William Ufford, 2nd Earl of Suffolk (died 15 February 1382), second son, who married Joan Montagu (2 February 1349 – before 27 June 1376), daughter of Edward Montagu, 1st Baron Montagu (died 14 July 1361) and Alice of Norfolk, by whom he had four sons and a daughter.
- Walter Ufford (born 3 October 1343), third son, who married, before February 1359, Elizabeth de Montagu (c. 1344 – before July 1361), daughter of Edward Montagu, 1st Baron Montagu (died 3 July 1461) and Alice of Norfolk, by whom he had no issue.
- Joan Ufford, eldest daughter, who was contracted to marry her father's ward, John de St Philibert; however the marriage did not take place.
- Katherine Ufford (born c. 1317, date of death unknown) married Robert de Scales, 3rd Baron Scales.
- Cecily Ufford (born c. 1327 – died before 29 March 1372), who married William, Lord Willoughby of Eresby. Their son Lord Robert and grandson Lord William quartered the arms of Ufford (Q1 and Q4) and Willoughby (Q2 and Q3). Thenceforth the Willoughby family adopted the arms of Ufford in lieu of their own arms.
- Margaret Ufford (born c. 1330 – died before 25 May 1368), who married Sir William Ferrers, 3rd Baron Ferrers of Groby.
- Maud Ufford, who became a nun at the Augustinian priory in Campsea Ashe, Suffolk.

== Notes ==
Peerage of England
New creation	Earl of Suffolk; 1337–1369	Succeeded by William de Ufford
