= Ufford, Suffolk =

Village and civil parish in England

Coordinates: 52.1231°N 1.3512°E

Ufford
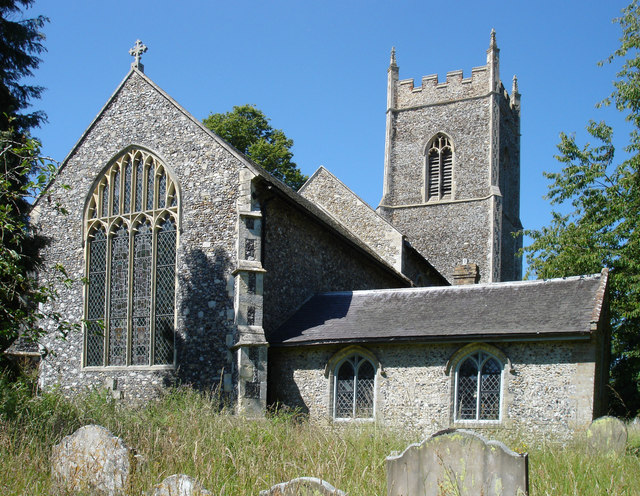
- The Church of St Mary

- Location within Suffolk
- Population: 808 (2001); 948 (2011)
- OS grid reference: TM2952
- District: East Suffolk
- Shire county: Suffolk
- Region: East
- Country: England
- Sovereign state: United Kingdom
- Post town: Woodbridge
- Postcode district: IP13
- Dialling code: 01394
- Police: Suffolk
- Fire: Suffolk
- Ambulance: East of England
- UK Parliament: Suffolk Coastal

Ufford is a village and civil parish in Suffolk, England. Its population of 808 at the 2001 census rose to 948 at the 2011 Census and was estimated at 1,008 in 2019. The village lies 2 miles (3.2 km) south-south-west of Wickham Market and 13 miles (21 km) north-east of Ipswich. The main road through the village was renumbered B1438 after its replacement as a trunk road by the new A12.

== Heritage ==
The village name means "Uffa's enclosure" (not "Uffa's ford") in Old English. The parish has 28 listed buildings, one of which is Grade I: the Church of St Mary.

=== St Mary's Church ===
St Mary's Anglican Church dates from the 11th century. It is served by the Rector of Melton and Ufford. It has a church hall. The War Memorial inside records 22 men who died in the First World War and four who died in the Second.

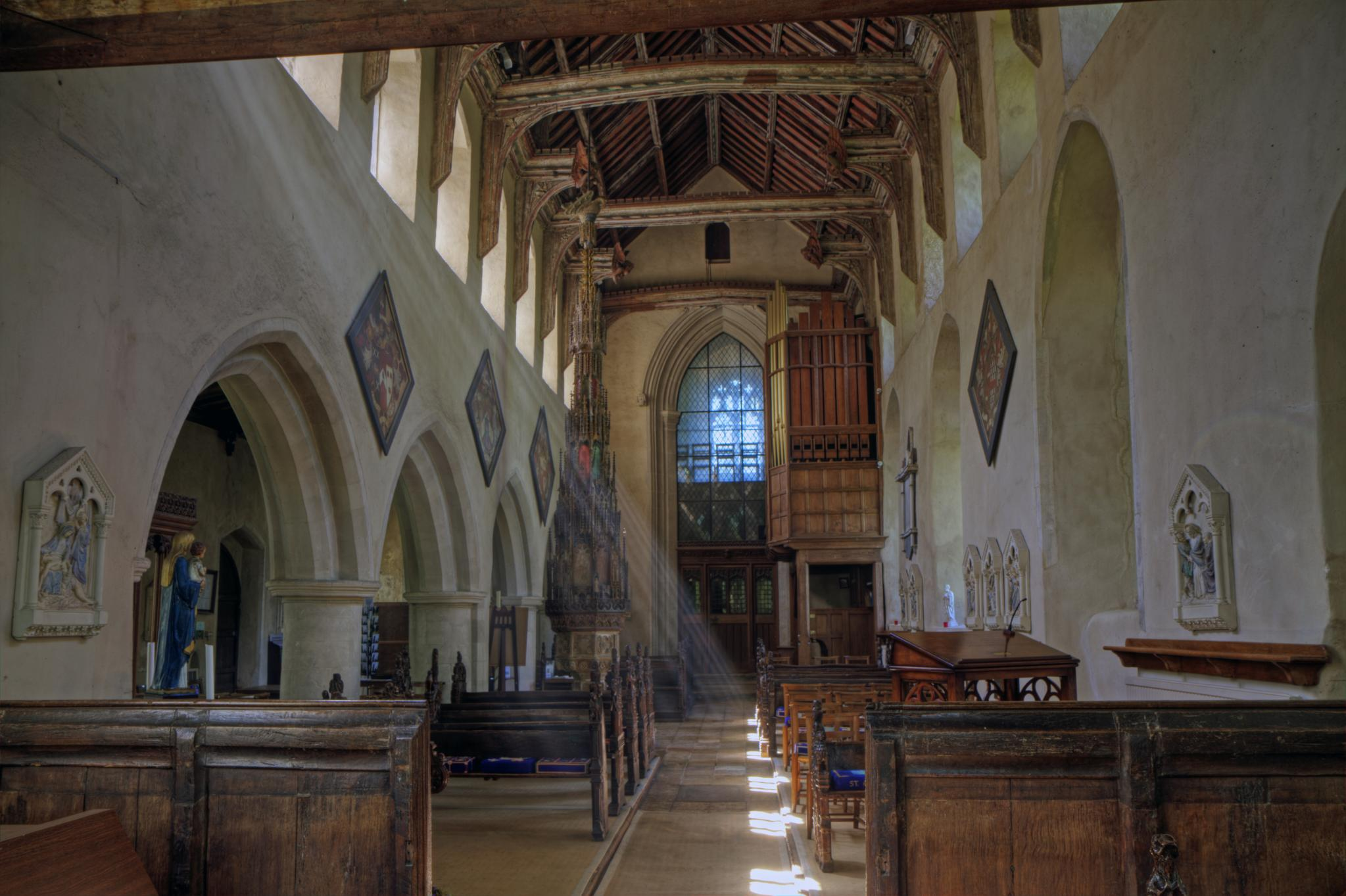
The interior of the church

The church is the oldest of 28 listed edifices in Ufford. Most are dwelling houses, some thatched, nearby in the eastern part of the village.

Eight bells hang in the tower for change ringing, the heaviest weighing 13 cwt (660 kg) and the oldest dating from about 1380, cast by William Dawe of London and inscribed Sum rosa pulsata mundi Katerina vocata (When struck I am Rose of the World called Katerina). The tower belongs to the Suffolk Guild of Ringers. The bells were rehung in a new frame and three bells recast by John Taylor & Co in 1936. The first peal rang on 24 October 1885; by 2019, 152 peals had rung.

The church is famous for medieval wood carvings, notably a font cover of about 1450 – the tallest such cover in England at 20 feet (6 metres). It is surmounted by a pelican pecking its breast to feed its chicks, a symbol of Christ feeding the faithful with his own body. The notorious 17th-century iconoclast William Dowsing left the structure intact after visiting the church in 1644, noting in his diary, it was "gorgeous... like a pope's triple crown."

== Transport ==
The nearest railway station is at Melton (2 miles/3.2 km) on the East Suffolk Line, with trains between Ipswich and Lowestoft about once an hour on weekdays and once in two hours on Sundays. There are five Monday-to-Friday buses a day between Woodbridge and Framlingham passing through Ufford, and regular daytime services between Aldeburgh and Ipswich on Mondays to Saturdays.

== Amenities ==
The village has a community hall, a recreation ground and two pubs, the Ufford Crown and White Lion. The nearest shopping facilities are in Wickham Market and Woodbridge, the nearest schools at Melton and Woodbridge.

Ufford Park Hotel has a golf course. Ufford Sports Football Club plays in the Suffolk and Ipswich Football League.

== Notable people ==
In birth order:

- Robert d'Ufford, 1st Earl of Suffolk (1298–1369), lord of the manor
- Sir Henry Wood, 1st Baronet (1597–1671), Member of Parliament for Hythe
- Sir Robert Kemp, 3rd Baronet (1667–1734), landowner and Tory politician, Member of Parliament for Dunwich and for Suffolk, died at Ufford.
- David Elisha Davy (1769–1851), antiquary and collector
- Francis Brooke (1810–1886), cricketer and High Sheriff of Suffolk in 1869.
- Mary Cholmondeley (1859–1925), novelist, lived in Ufford for some years before the First World War.
- Admiral of the Fleet Terence Lewin, Baron Lewin,(1920–1999) lived in the village.
- Eila Grahame (1935–2009), antique dealer, is buried at Ufford.
