= Campsea Ashe =

Village in Suffolk, England

Coordinates: 52.153°N 1.406°E

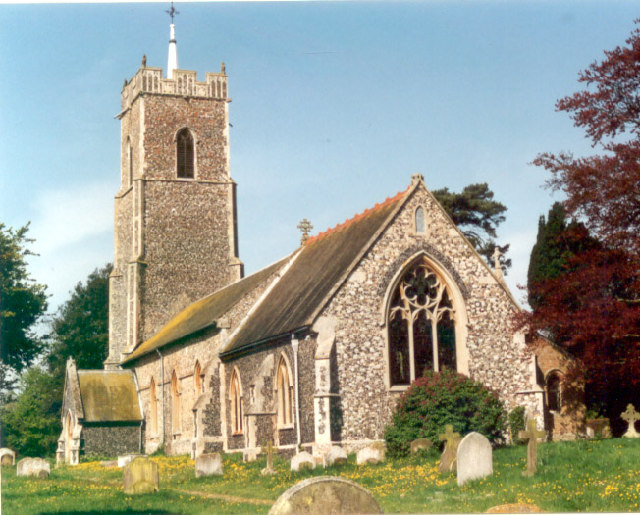
- St John the Baptist Church, Campsea Ashe

- Location within Suffolk
- Population: 375 (2011)
- OS grid reference: TM325557
- Civil parish: Campsea Ashe
- District: East Suffolk
- Shire county: Suffolk
- Region: East
- Country: England
- Sovereign state: United Kingdom
- Post town: Woodbridge
- Postcode district: IP13
- Dialling code: 01728
- UK Parliament: Central Suffolk and North Ipswich

Campsea Ashe (sometimes spelt Campsey Ash) is a village in Suffolk, England, located approximately 5 miles (8 km) north east of Woodbridge and 6 miles (10 km) south west of Saxmundham.

The village is served by Wickham Market railway station on the Ipswich-Lowestoft East Suffolk Line.

The modern village covers two medieval villages, Campesia and Esce. The former was the site of an Augustinian nunnery Campsey Priory, suppressed in 1536, of which only the Mill and Mill house still exist as Grade II* listed buildings.

The Campsea church of St John the Baptist dates from the 14th century, and survives as the local parish church. It is a grade II* listed building.

Campsea has an Auction Room, dating to the 1920s, with a weekly auction held on Mondays.

== The name ==
The name has long been recognized by toponymists as being of difficult etymology. Skeat, in his 1913 book on the Place-names of Suffolk, suggested that Campsey was Kampi's island', with a Norse personal name Kampi, and Old English ēg. This has not been accepted by any later scholar. Gelling, in her 1988 work Signposts to the past (pages 77–78), included Campsey in a group of names including the Old English word camp, meaning `field' but of Latin derivation and so probably associated with earlier Roman settlement. This is the etymology in the current standard place-name dictionaries. But there is still doubt, because there is no obvious island for the ēg element to refer to. It is possible that the second element is not ēg at all, but that the name is camp-esce, where *esce is a collective noun for a group of ash trees. Historically, Campsey is the more correct spelling (despite the doubts over etymology) and was used on all Ordnance Survey maps (as Campsey Ash) up to the 1960s. The spelling Campsea perhaps originated in 1921 when James Lowther was created Viscount Ullswater of Campsea Ashe, where the spelling Campsea was felt to be more archaic and therefore appropriate to a heraldic name. Campsea Ashe was used in an article in The Railway Magazine in December 1954.

== Origins and medieval period ==
In the Domesday Survey of 1086, where the manor of Campesia was flourishing and covered some 200 acres, while Esca was smaller neighbouring settlement. Granted by William the Conqueror to his supporters, their holders included Alan Rufus, Lord of Richmond Robert Malet, Hervey de Berre and the Bigod family, the latter being relatives of the King.

The possession and tenancy of the lands, including the small Manor of Ashe, underwent various permutations during the succeeding centuries, by death, reversion to the crown, inheritance and marriage. For example, the once powerful Bigod family died out in 1310. Passing through the hands of the Plantagenets, Segraves and de Mowbrays, it merged into the lands of the Fitzalan and Howard clan, to become Dukes of Norfolk. It was in their possession until about 1640. It is believed that the small parcel of land in the Manor of Ashe continued to be part of the estate. The Priory, founded in 1195, ended its days abruptly in 1536 with the Dissolution and much of its lands and other property was granted to Sir William Willoughby of Parham, who had gravitated to the honeypot represented by the household set up for Henry FitzRoy, 1st Duke of Richmond and Somerset, illegitimate son of Henry VIII, who died on him in July 1536.

== Elizabethan and later times ==
The Priory property was then subject after 1536 to sale through a string of owners, including the Lane family, the Scotts and the Loudhams. Other local lands were not part of the Priory estates, but some of these were purchased by Sir William Willoughby, later Lord Willoughby, before he sold it on the owners such as the Greshams, Wentworths, Stringers and Jenneys. John Glover, purchaser of the Manor of Campsea and other local lands, lived at Ash Moorhall, the manor house, around 1558 and built a distinguished Elizabethan house on his lands, the four-storeyed Ash High House, completed by his son William around 1600. The family sold out to John Sheppard of Mendlesham, Suffolk in 1652.

The Manor of Ashe and Chantry Hall, (the manor house) were bought by the local John Brame, who also acquired the Manor of Valence, Blaxhall. The whole later passed by inheritance and sale to the Revetts.

Ashe High House was the home from 1652 to 1882 of the Sheppard family, part of the house damaged by fire in 1865 being rebuilt in congruent style by the architect Anthony Salvin. In 1882 house and estate were sold to the diplomat William Lowther, for a time MP for Westmorland. At its next sale, in 1949, Ashe High House was described as having 31 bedrooms and dressing rooms, 6 bathrooms, 6 reception rooms and a library. The estate in 1882 amounted to 4,100 acres, 144 acres of deer and home parks and 240 acres of woods and plantations, with 13 farms. The new owners were residents of Campsea Ashe for the next 66 years. The property passed in 1912 to Lowther's son, James, Speaker of the House of Commons from 1905 until 1921, created subsequently Viscount Ullswater of Campsea Ashe. He died at the High House in March 1949, aged 94.

After repeated sales following the Second World War, Ashe High House fell into ruin and only the foundations now survive.

== Historical features ==
=== Parish church ===
At the present parish church of St John the Baptist Norman stonework has been uncovered. In the 14th century came the addition of the tower, which is 76 feet (23m) high. The church probably dates largely from this period and the first known advowson was presented in 1312 and a rector was appointed at that time. Like many other village churches, this church was extensively restored in the 18th and 19th centuries: restored and frankly altered between 1789 and 1792 under the then incumbent, the Rev Kilderbee, and around 1869 further refurbished and modified under the Rev. Reginald Bridges Knatchbull-Hugessen, the son of Rt. Hon. Sir Edward Knatchbull, Bt.

Bells were here to be rung from at least 1553 but by 20th century could no longer be safely used. Interventions took place in 1999 to permit them to ring in the new millennium, and then in 2010, a full restoration was carried out, the bells being increased from 4 to 6 bells and the earlier gallery, removed in 1878, belatedly replaced to constitute a ringing gallery.

The former Rectory, a handsome Georgian house, situated on the west-side of the churchyard, is first mentioned in 1765 but it is likely that the site was occupied by a parsonage prior to this. Refurbished in 1826, it was in bad repair by 1906, when the thatched roof was replaced by tiles. Having been used as a hostel by the Woman's Land Army during the last War, it was sold into private hands shortly afterwards.

=== Former Campsey Priory ===
See Campsey Priory

A prominent feature of local history was Campsey Priory, an Augustinian nunnery founded by a powerful local lord and landowner Theobald de Valoines in 1195 and endowed with extensive lands. The Priory housed as a nun for several years in the 14th century the redoubtable and well-connected Maud of Lancaster, Countess of Ulster but despite these auspicious times, like all other monasteries in England it was confiscated by the crown for financial gain under Henry VIII, the nunnery being in effect forced to close in 1536. As was the policy, the buildings were largely demolished and little survived.
