= Wickham Market =

Village in Suffolk, England

Coordinates: 52.15°N 1.367°E

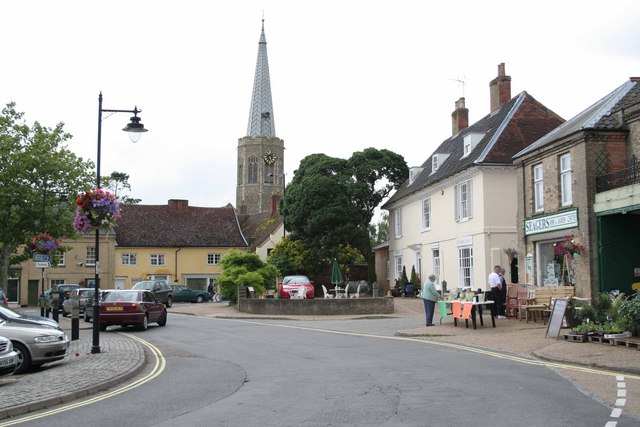
- Village centre with All Saints Church in the background

- Location within Suffolk
- Area: 4.81 km^{2} (1.86 sq mi)
- Population: 2,156 (2011)
  - Density: 448/km^{2} (1,160/sq mi)
- OS grid reference: TM3056
- Civil parish: Wickham Market
- District: East Suffolk
- Shire county: Suffolk
- Region: East
- Country: England
- Sovereign state: United Kingdom
- Post town: Woodbridge
- Postcode district: IP13
- Dialling code: 01728
- UK Parliament: Central Suffolk and North Ipswich

Wickham Market is a large village and electoral ward in the River Deben valley, Suffolk, England, within the Suffolk Coastal heritage area.

It is on the A12 trunk road 13 miles (21 km) north-east of the county town of Ipswich, 5 miles (8.0 km) north-east of Woodbridge. Its railway station is 2 miles (3.2 km) east at Campsea Ashe. The population at the 2011 Census was 2,156.

== Wickham Market Iron Works ==
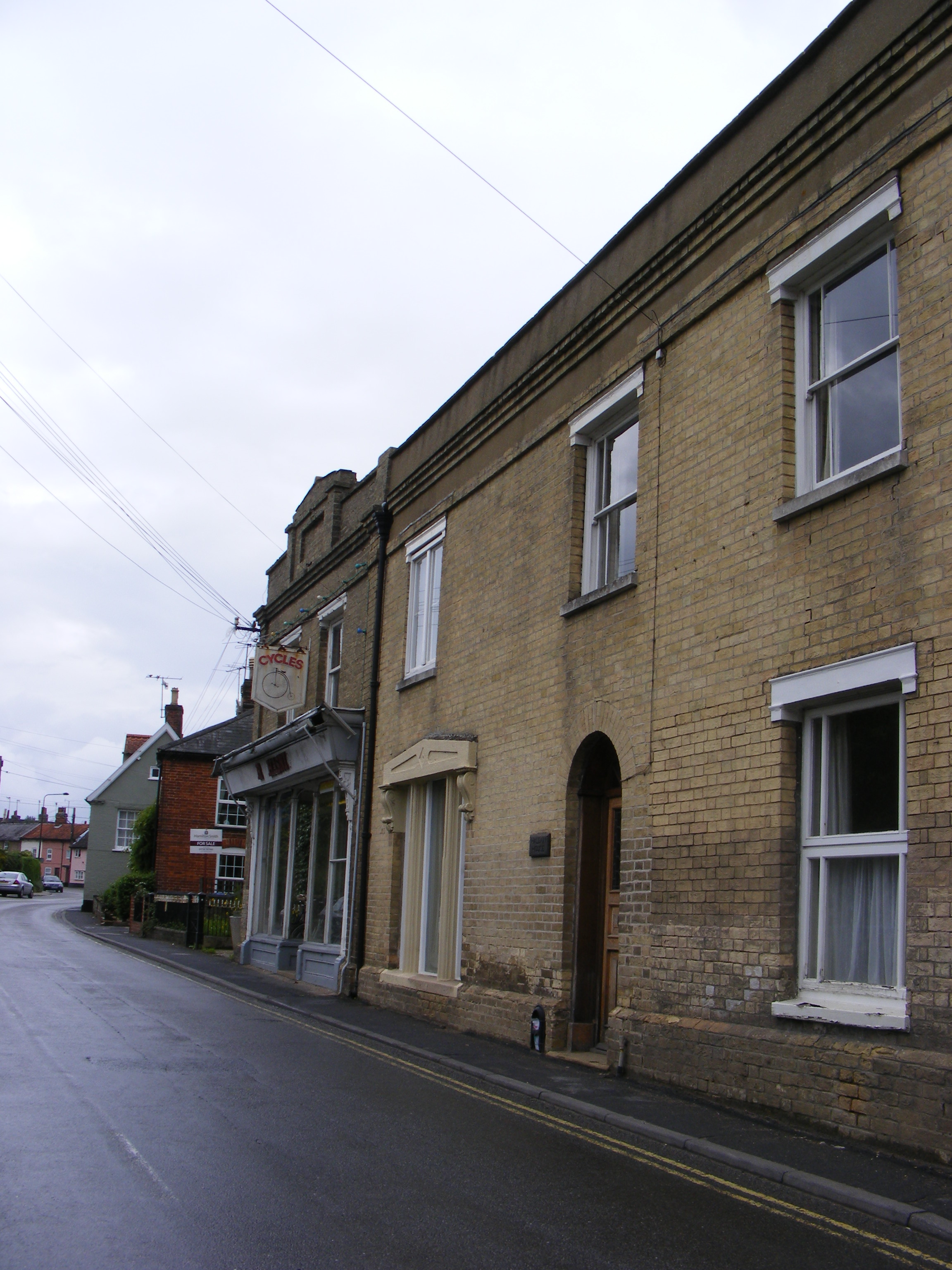
Former buildings of the Wickham Market Iron Works

The Wickham Market Iron Works was an industrial site in Wickham Market that grew during the nineteenth century. The site had belonged to the Crane family and John Whitmore. Nathaniel Minter had a small millwright business here until his death in 1812. Whilst his widow, Elizabeth, kept the business going, hiring workers as appropriate. Whitmore completed his apprenticeship as a millwright and in 1827 he married Harriet Crane and launched his business with an announcement in the Ipswich Journal. By 1864 Whitmore and Sons employed 200 workers. By 1868 the company became Whitmore and Binyon a partnership which survived for 33 years, until 1901 when the company was wound up. The Iron Works was sold, realising just under £500, and by 1903 little was left of the site except the office buildings.

== Deben Mill ==
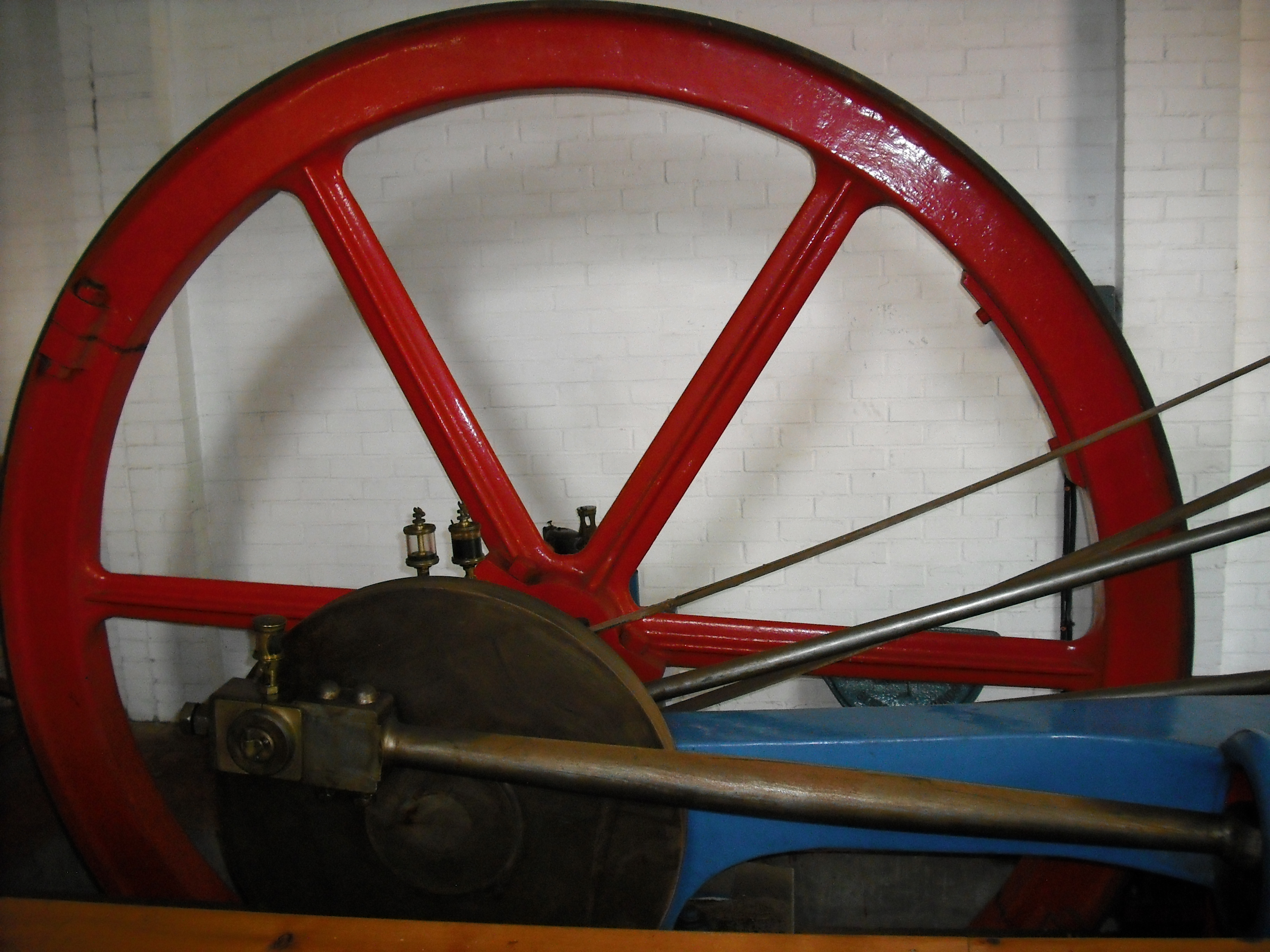
Whitmore and Binyon steam-engine, installed at the flour mill in 1893

Deben Mill, also known as Wickham Mill, is a Grade II* listed building dating from the 18th century. The watermill's machinery is complete and in working order. The earliest record of the mill dates from 1701.

In 1893 mill owner Reuben Rackham purchased a Whitmore and Binyon horizontal condensing steam engine, at a cost of £25,000, to drive the mill. The engine was installed in July 1893 and the entire plant was operational by October of the same year. The engine was last worked in 1957 and was subsequently moved to the Museum of East Anglian Life in Stowmarket as a gift of Edward and Robert Rackham, Rueben Rackham's sons.

== Other landmarks ==
All Saints Church is over 700 years old and its octagonal tower and lead spire (137.5 feet (41.9 m) tall) dominate the skyline and make it visible for miles over the surrounding countryside. The exterior of the church is stone and flintwork. Inside there are four stained glass windows, a 600-year-old font, a carved pulpit and an altar table with a painted reredos. There are six bells in the tower and a sanctus bell in the cote.

Other nearby attractions include Valley Farm Equestrian Visitor Centre, Easton Farm Park, Glevering Hall, the Snape Maltings, Framlingham Castle and Sutton Hoo.

== Wickham Market Hoard ==
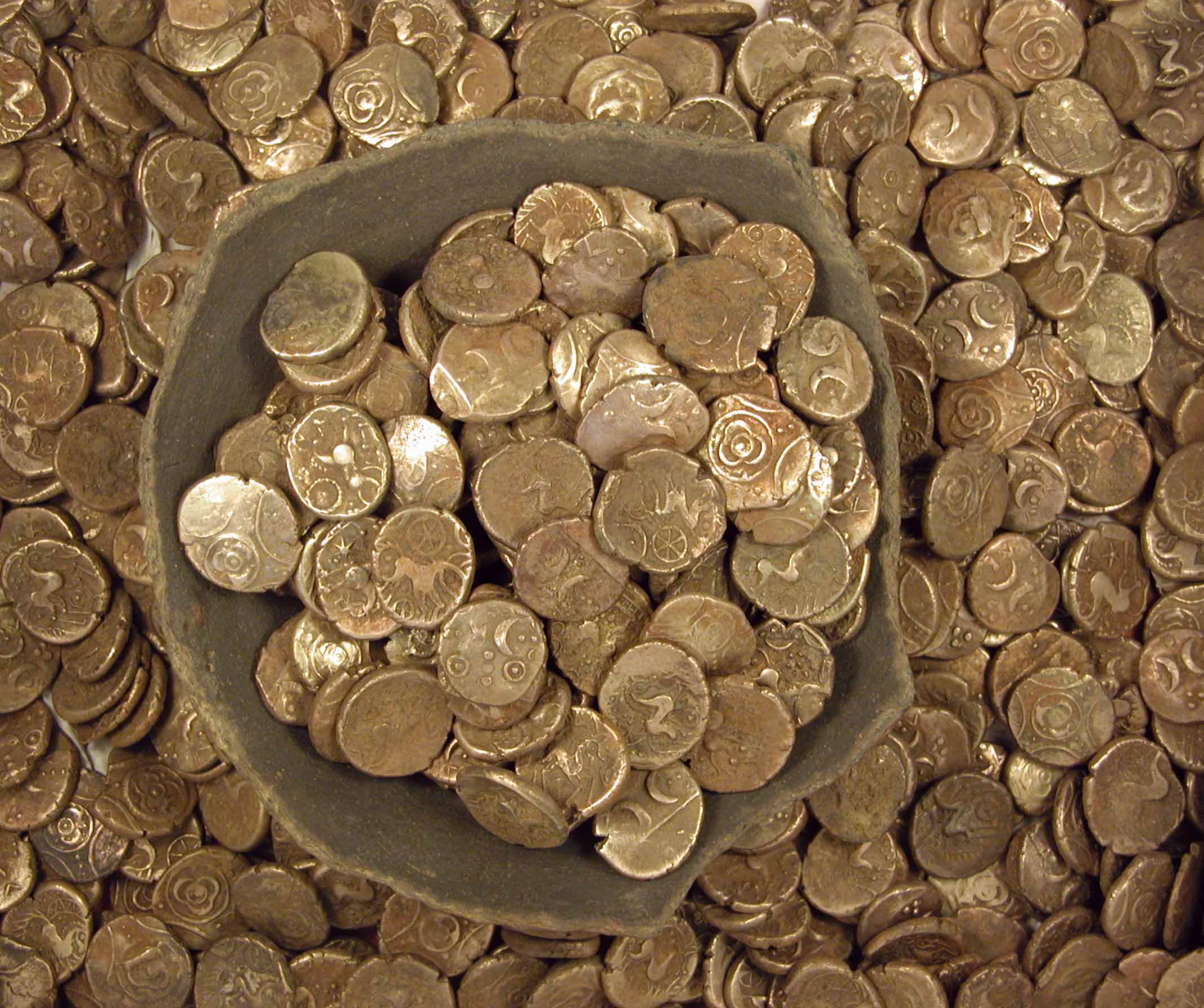
Wickham Market Hoard

In 2008 one of the largest British Iron Age coin finds was discovered at a site near Wickham Market. The hoard of gold staters was found in a field near the village of Dallinghoo, by car mechanic Michael Dark, using a metal detector. After excavation of the site a total of 840 coins were recorded and the hoard was declared to be treasure trove.

Described as "the largest hoard of British Iron Age gold coins to be studied in its entirety", it also provided much new information about the Iron Age "particularly East Anglia in the late Iron Age". It was the largest hoard of staters to be found since the Whaddon Chase Iron Age Hoard in 1849.

The coins dated from 40 BC–15 AD and would have been worth between £500,000 and £1M, to the Iceni tribes who inhabited the area at the time.

== Notable residents ==
- Charles Emeny (1846–1924), an early photographer was born here.
- Francis Lucas (1850–1918), businessman and Conservative Member of Parliament for Lowestoft 1900–1906.
- Flora Sandes (1876–1956), the only British female soldier to officially serve in World War I.
- Chinwe Chukwuogo-Roy MBE (1952–2012), Royal portrait painter best known for her portrait for the Golden Jubilee of Elizabeth II and her innovative techniques.
