= Malet =

Malet is a French surname. Notable people with the surname include:

- Albert Malet (historian) (1864–1915), French historian and author of scholarly manuals
- Albert Malet (painter) (1912–1986), French painter
- Alexander Malet (1800–1886), English diplomat and writer
- André Malet (abbot) (1862–1936), abbot of the Trappist abbey of Sainte-Marie-du-Désert at Bellegarde-Sainte-Marie
- André Malet (philosopher) (1920–1989), French Catholic priest who became a Unitarian Protestant
- Antoine de Malet, Marquis de Coupigny, French-born Spanish military officer
- Antoni Malet, Catalan historian of mathematics and professor of history of science
- Arthur Malet (1927–2013), British actor
- Claude François de Malet (1754–1812), general of the First French Empire, organiser of coup d'état against Napoleon
- Elizabeth Malet (1651–1681), English heiress, Countess of Rochester
- Frederick de Carteret Malet (1837–1912), New Zealand leader in business, church, and educational matters
- Guy Seymour Warre Malet (1900–1973), English artist
- Jean-Roland Malet (1675–1736), French historian and economist
- Joan Malet (c.1510–1549), Catalan witch-hunter
- John Malet (1623–1686), English lawyer, MP for Minehead and Bridgwater, son of Thomas
- John Malet (died 1570), English landowner, MP for Plymouth and Bodmin
- John Malet (died 1644), English landowner, MP for Bath
- Laurent Malet (born 1955), French actor
- Léo Malet (1909–1996), French writer
- Lucas Malet, pseudonym of Mary St Leger Kingsley (1852–1931), English novelist
- Michael Malet (c.1632 – after 1683), English lawyer and politician, son of Thomas
- Oriel Malet, pseudonym of Welsh author Lady Auriel Rosemary Malet Vaughan (1923–2014)
- Pierre Antoine Anselme Malet (1778–1815), soldier, maréchal de camp and général de brigade
- Pierre Malet (born 1955), French actor
- Robert Malet, 12th-century Norman-English baron
- Rosa Maria Malet (born 1948), Spanish art historian and museum director
- Thierry Malet, French composer of film music
- Thomas Malet (1582–1665), English judge and politician
- William Malet (companion of William the Conqueror) (died 1071), Norman lord who fought in the Battle of Hastings
- William Malet (exile) (died c. 1121), Norman lord who forfeited his English lands and was banished from England
- William Malet (Magna Carta baron) (fl. 1195–1215), a guarantor of Magna Carta
- The Malet baronets, including:
  - Sir Charles Malet, 1st Baronet (1752–1815), British East India Company official
  - Sir Alexander Malet, 2nd Baronet (1800–1886), diplomat and writer
  - Sir Edward Baldwin Malet, 4th Baronet (1837–1908), diplomat

== See also ==
- Malet Lambert (disambiguation)
- Mallett, a surname
- Mallette, a surname
- Mallet (surname)
- Mallet (disambiguation)
