= Mallet (surname) =

Mallet is a surname. Notable people with the surname include:

- Alain Manesson Mallet (1630–1706), French cartographer and engineer
- Alexandre Mallet (born 1992), Canadian ice hockey player
- Anatole Mallet (1837–1919), Swiss mechanical engineer
- Sir Bernard Mallet (1859–1932), British civil servant
- Sir Charles Mallet (1862–1947), British historian and politician
- David Mallet (writer) (c.1705–1765), Scottish dramatist and poet
- David Mallet (director) (born 1945), British director
- Demond Mallet (born 1978), American basketball player
- Elizabeth Mallet (fl.1672–1706), British printer and bookseller
- Émile Mallet, Baron of Itapevi (1801–1886), French-Brazilian Marshal
- Ernest Mallet (1863–1956), French banker
- Félicia Mallet (1863–1928), French comedian, singer and pantomime artist
- Francis Mallet (died 1570), English churchman
- Frederick Richard Mallet (1841-1921), Irish geologist who worked in India
- Sir George Mallet (1923–2010), Saint Lucia politician
- Georgia Mallet (born 2005), Jersey cricketer
- Grégory Mallet (born 1984), French swimmer
- Sir Ivo Mallet (1900–1988), British ambassador
- Jacques Mallet du Pan (1749–1800), French journalist
- James Mallet (born 1955), British biologist
- John Mallet (died 1570), MP for Bodmin
- John Mallet (1832–1912), Irish chemist
- Sir Louis Mallet (1823–1890), British civil servant
- Sir Louis du Pan Mallet (1864–1936), British diplomat
- Marie-Anne-Marcelle Mallet (1805–1871), Canadian nun, founder of the Sisters of Charity of Quebec
- Maurice Mallet (1861–1926), French cofounder of Zodiac Aerospace
- Nathalie Mallet, Canadian writer
- Pardal Mallet (1864–1894), Brazilian journalist and novelist
- Paul Henri Mallet (1730–1807), Genevan historian
- Pierre Antoine and Paul Mallet, French travellers and explorers
- Robert Mallet (1810–1881), Irish geologist, civil engineer, and inventor
- Tania Mallet (1941–2019), English model
- Véronik Mallet (born 1994), Canadian figure skater
- Vincent Mallet (born 1993), French rugby union player
- Sir Victor Mallet (1893–1969), British diplomat

== See also ==
- Mallet family, a French family of bankers and businessmen
- Mallett, a similar surname
- Malet, a similar surname
