= Mallet (disambiguation) =

A mallet is a kind of hammer. Mallet is also the proper US English term for a Polo stick.

Mallet may also refer to:

== Places ==
- Mallet, Paraná, a municipality in southern Brazil
- Mallet, Rio de Janeiro, a region in Rio de Janeiro, Brazil
- Mont Mallet, a mountain in France
- Mallet Creek (disambiguation), in Ohio, USA
- Mallet Ranch, a historic ranch in Texas, USA
- Mallet (crater), a crater on the Moon

== Other uses ==
- Mallet percussion, a percussion instrument
- Percussion mallet, the mallet used with a percussion instrument
- Mallet locomotive, a specific type of steam locomotive
- Mallet (surname) (including a list of people with the name)
- Mallet family, a French family of bankers and businessmen
- Mallet (software project), a collection of java code for natural language processing tasks
- Mallet, a common placeholder name for an attacker in computer security, see Alice and Bob
- Mallet, alternative term for marlock, a shrubby or small-tree form of Eucalyptus
- Mallet (habit), a small-tree form of Eucalyptus found in Western Australia
- Mallet Assembly, an autonomous honors program at the University of Alabama

== See also ==
- Curry Mallet, England
- Shepton Mallet, England
- Malet
- Mallett, a surname
- Mullet (disambiguation)
