= André Malet =

André Malet may refer to:

- André Malet (abbot) (1862–1936), abbot of the Trappist abbey of Sainte-Marie-du-Désert, Bellegarde-Sainte-Marie, Haute-Garonne
- André Malet (philosopher) (died 1989), French Catholic priest and philosopher who became a Unitarian Protestant
