= William Malet =

William Malet may refer to:

- William Malet (companion of William the Conqueror) (died 1071), Norman lord who fought in the Battle of Hastings
- William Malet (exile) (died c. 1121), Norman lord who forfeited his English lands and was banished from England
- William Malet (Magna Carta baron) (fl. 1195–1215), guarantor of Magna Carta

== See also ==
- Billy Mallett, Coronation Street character
