= History of Suffolk =

History of the English county

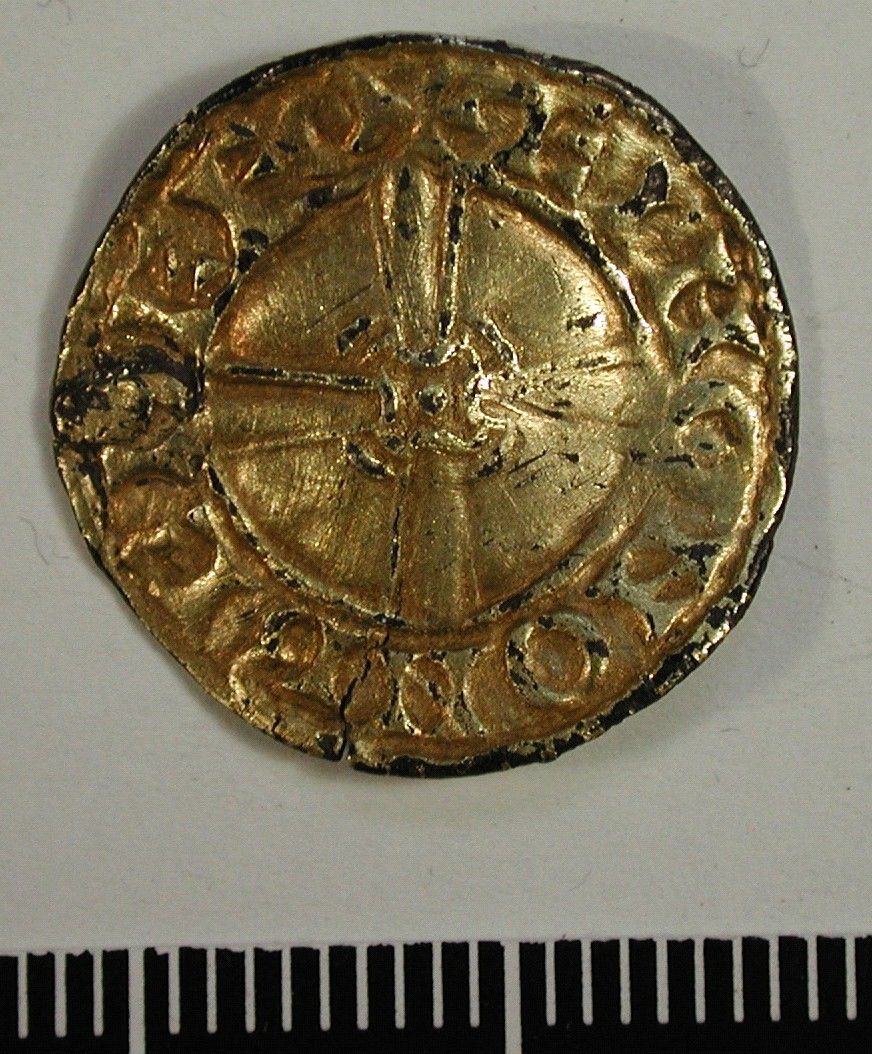
An Anglo-Saxon coin brooch (reverse); Sudbury, Suffolk

Although the English county of Suffolk in eastern England starts as an administrative unit after the Anglo-Saxon settlement, evidence of human activity in Suffolk stretches back over 700,000 years, with prehistoric sites among the earliest known in northern Europe. It emerged after the Dark Ages as the southern part of the Kingdom of East Anglia, and became a distinct entity during the early medieval period, with important settlements at Sudbury and Ipswich.

The county experienced successive waves of conquest and political change: from Danish incursions and integration into the Danelaw, through Norman feudal restructuring, to the religious and civil turmoil of later centuries. Its economy evolved from medieval cloth-making and agriculture to industrial and maritime activities in the 18th and 19th centuries.

Suffolk's political structures, ecclesiastical boundaries, and administrative divisions have remained relatively stable, despite periodic reforms and erosion of its coastline. The county also boasts a wealth of historic architecture, including castles, abbeys, flint-decorated churches, and Tudor manor houses, as well as Napoleonic Martello towers along its coast.

== Historical setting ==
=== Prehistory ===
One of the most significant early discoveries was made at Hoxne, where, in 1797, John Frere unearthed flint hand axes in stratified deposits. This find provided early evidence of human antiquity in Britain and led to the naming of the Hoxnian Stage, an interglacial period approximately 400,000 years ago. Other notable Palaeolithic sites in Suffolk include Pakefield and Beeches Pit, which have yielded artefacts dating back to around 700,000 years ago, making them among the earliest known human sites in northern Europe.

The Neolithic period (c. 4000–2500 BCE) saw the introduction of agriculture, pottery, and permanent settlements. Evidence from sites like the Freston causewayed enclosure suggests communal gatherings or ritual activities during this time. The subsequent Bronze Age (c. 2500–800 BCE) is marked by the construction of burial mounds and the development of metalworking. Excavations in areas such as Clare have revealed barrows and associated artefacts, indicating established funerary practices. By the Iron Age (c. 800 BCE–AD 43), Suffolk's landscape featured hillforts like Clare Camp, and evidence of trade and agriculture becomes more prominent, reflecting a complex and organized society prior to Roman influence.

=== Roman period ===
Archaeological evidence suggests that during the Roman occupation of Britain parts of modern Suffolk were in the territory of the Iceni tribe, whose capital is thought to have been at Venta Icenorum (near present-day Caistor St Edmund in Norfolk). They were initially allied with the Romans but rebelled under their queen Boudica in AD 60–61 with the rebellion likely to have had a direct impact on settlements in the region. The southern part of Suffolk was occupied by the Trinobantes.

Roman influence is evident in sites such as Castle Hill near Ipswich and Icklingham in West Suffolk yielding evidence of Roman buildings and occupation layers. The Romans developed a network of roads through the region, including sections of Peddars Way and other routes linking settlements and military sites. Finds of Roman pottery, metalwork, and coins suggest a degree of integration into the broader Romano-British economy, though Suffolk remained largely rural and agriculturally focused throughout the Roman period.

There is evidence of depopulation of the Romanised Britons towards the end of the Roman period, possibly linked to coastal insecurity and raiding on the Saxon Shore.

=== Anglo-Saxons ===
The county of Suffolk was formed from the south part of the kingdom of East Anglia which had been settled on a large scale by the Angles from the latter half of the 5th century. Place name evidence suggests that Norfolk and Suffolk formed a linguistic bloc. A distinctive Germanic material culture largely replaced Romano-British traditions, in contrast to southern England where cultural fusion was more common. Before the Norman Conquest, strongholds had arisen at Eye, Clare, Walton and Framlingham with the most important Anglo-Saxon settlements appearing to be Sudbury and Ipswich.

The Sutton Hoo burial in the east of the County is evidence of a royal presence at Rendlesham, the burial likely to have been Raedwald. Suffolk was definitively christianised by Raedwald's son Sigeberht founding the diocese of Dommoc around 631.

Suffolk suffered severely from Danish incursions, with King Edmund being defeated at Hoxne by the Great Heathen Army led by Ivar the Boneless. After the Treaty of Wedmore it became a part of the Danelaw. Due to the disruption caused by the invasions, the diocese of Dommoc was merged with the diocese of Elmham in Norfolk, which eventually became the Diocese of Norwich with Suffolk not having its own diocese until 1914.

King Edward the Elder conquered the eastern Danelaw in 917, and the shires of Norfolk and Suffolks are generally thought to have been established shortly afterwards, but the counties are not recorded until the mid-eleventh century, and the historian Lucy Marten argues that the shiring was carried out by King Cnut (1016-1035).

=== Medieval period ===
Following the Norman Conquest, Suffolk underwent a substantial reorganisation of land ownership and governance under the feudal system imposed by William the Conqueror. The county was divided among a small number of powerful Norman lords who were active in the Conquest with extensive estates in Suffolk granted to figures such as William Malet, Richard fitz Gilbert and Roger Bigod. The Domesday Book of 1086 records a high proportion of freemen as householders at 40% and the highest number of churches in the Eastern counties. Suffolk also had two major castles in the period after the conquest - Eye Castle and Clare Castle. The 1075 marriage at Exning, unsanctioned by King William I, between the Earl of East Anglia, Ralph de Gael, and Emma de Breteuil, the daughter of the powerful William FitzOsbern may have started the Revolt of the Earls.

During the Revolt of 1173–1174 against Henry II, the Earl of Leicester landed with a force of Flemings at Walton, where he was joined by Hugh Bigod. Although the invasion was repelled at the Battle of Fornham, the episode underscored Suffolk’s strategic importance.

From 1290 onwards, the county seat of Suffolk was permanently represented in the House of Commons by two knights of the shire.

Two major ecclesiastical liberties exercised jurisdiction over more than half the county: the Liberty of St Edmund, later forming the basis of West Suffolk, and the Liberty of Ely in the south-east. Other significant landholdings with judicial and administrative power were Honour of Clare, Honour of Framlingham and the Honour of Eye. For civil governance, the Liberty of St Edmund and the rest of the county (referred to as the "body") functioned separately, each providing its own grand jury to the county assizes. Although Suffolk was recognised as distinct from Norfolk in the Domesday Survey the two counties continued to share a single sheriff for fiscal and administrative purposes until 1575.

Throughout the 14th century, Suffolk was repeatedly involved in national unrest. In 1317 and the following years, much of the county supported Thomas of Lancaster. In 1326, Queen Isabella and Roger Mortimer landed (again at Walton) and found the region broadly sympathetic. In 1330, the county was mobilised against the supporters of the Earl of Kent, and in 1381 it was the scene of significant unrest during the Peasants' Revolt, particularly around Bury St Edmunds.

Despite largely supporting the House of York during the Wars of the Roses, Suffolk played only a limited active role in the conflict.

=== Early modern period ===
In 1525 the artisans of the south strongly resisted Henry VIII's forced loan in the Lavenham Revolt. It was from Suffolk that Mary Tudor drew the army which supported her claim to the throne.

Among the many fine residences within the county there are several interesting examples of domestic architecture of the reigns of Henry VIII and Elizabeth I. Hengrave Hall (c. 1530), north-west from Bury St Edmunds, is a noteworthy example an exceedingly picturesque building of brick and stone, enclosing a courtyard. Another is Helmingham Hall, a Tudor mansion of brick, surrounded by a moat crossed by a drawbridge. West Stow Manor is also Tudor; its gatehouse is fine, but the mansion has been adapted into a farmhouse.

James I built a palace at Newmarket where a large amount of court business was held and this was also a favourite resort of both his son Charles and grandson Charles II when they were king. In 1642, Charles I met a parliamentary deputation in Newmarket Palace where refused to surrender of the armed forces. effectively started the English Civil War. During the war the county was for the most part parliamentarian only seeing serious Cavalier resistance in Lowestoft, which was put down by Cromwell's Ironsides and Suffolk for most of the war was with its neigbhbouring counties in the Eastern Association, militarily led by the Earl of Manchester who soon appointed his provost-marshal, William Dowsing, as a paid iconoclast, touring the churches of Suffolk destroying all "Popish" and "superstitious" imagery, as well as features such as altar-rails.

In early June 1647, Charles was brought to Newmarket as a prisoner. He was placed under house arrest in the palace while the whole of the New Model Army kept guard over the town. A survey in 1649 showed that the palace was in disrepair. The following year, the palace was sold to John Okey (one of the regicides), who demolished most of the buildings.

=== Nineteenth century ===
The county has a number of Martello towers along its stretch of coastline, most of which were constructed during the first decade of the 19th century to guard against a potential invasion by Napoleon Bonaparte's France.

The Reform Bill of 1832 gave four members to Suffolk, at the same time disenfranchising the boroughs of Dunwich, Orford and Aldeburgh.

In 1837 the archdeaconry of Sudbury was transferred by the ecclesiastical commissioners to the diocese of Ely.

The first flow assembly line was initiated at the factory of Richard Garrett & Sons, Leiston Works in Leiston for the manufacture of portable steam engines. The assembly line area was called 'The Long Shop' on account of its length and was fully operational by early 1853.

Under the Local Government Act 1888 Suffolk was divided into the two administrative counties of East and West Suffolk.

== Land division ==
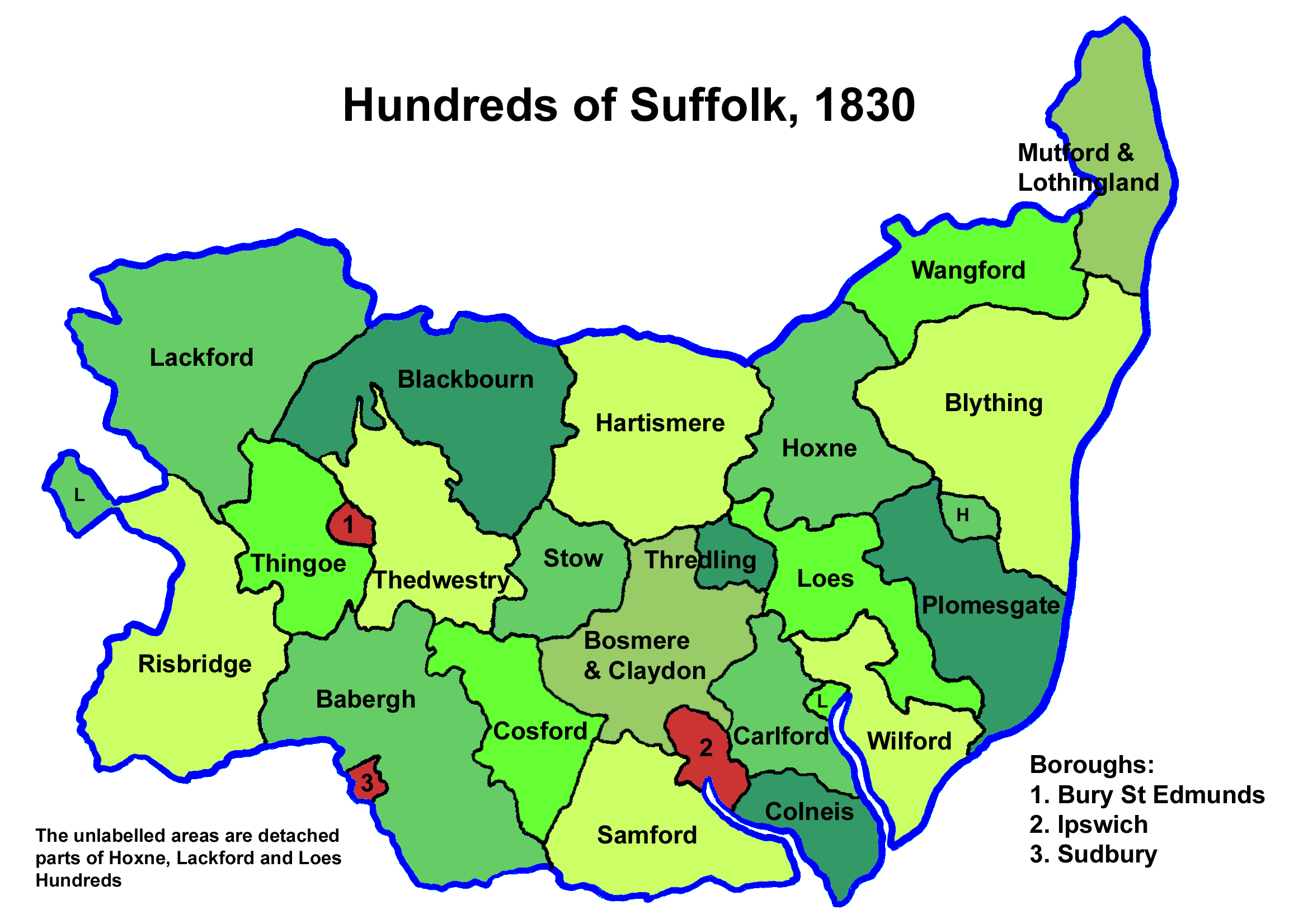

The shire court was held at Ipswich. In 1831 the whole county contained twenty-one hundreds and three municipal boroughs.

The Wingfields, Bacons and Herveys have been closely connected with the county.

The county was divided into "geldable" land, in which fines and forfeitures were payable to the Crown, and the liberties and franchises where they were payable to the lord of the liberty. The geldable lands were divided into two quarter sessions divisions: Bungay (Hundreds of Blything, Mutford And Launditch and Wangford); and Ipswich (Bosmere and Claydon, Hartismere, Hoxne, Samford and Stow). The Liberty of St Etheldredra held sessions at Woodbridge while those of the St Edmund were held at Bury St Edmunds. By the early nineteenth century these were being referred to simply as Beccles, Bury St Edmunds, Ipswich and Woodbridge Divisions. The three quarter sessions divisions of Beccles, Ipswich and Woodbridge were combined to form a single division in 1860. From that date Suffolk had eastern and western divisions with sessions held at Ipswich and Bury St Edmunds respectively. These became the basis for the two administrative counties of East Suffolk and West Suffolk in 1890.

The boundary of the county has undergone very little change, though its area has been considerably affected by coast erosion. Parts of Gorleston and Thetford, which formerly belonged to the ancient county of Suffolk, are now within the administrative county of Norfolk, and other slight alterations of the administrative boundary have been made.

== Economy ==
Suffolk was early among the most populous of English counties, doubtless owing to its proximity to the continent. Fishing fleets have left its ports to bring back cod and ling from Iceland and herring and mackerel from the North Sea. From the 14th to the 17th century it was among the chief manufacturing counties of England owing to its cloth-weaving industry, which was at the height of its prosperity during the 15th century. In the 17th and 18th centuries its agricultural resources were used to provide the rapidly growing metropolis with food. In the following century various textile industries, such as the manufacture of sail-cloth, coconut fibre, horse-hair and clothing were established; silk-weavers migrated to Suffolk from Spitalfields, and early in the 19th century an important china factory flourished at Lowestoft.

== Relics ==
Of monastic remains the most important are those of

- the great Benedictine abbey of Bury St Edmunds;
- the college of Clare, originally a cell to Bec Abbey in Normandy and afterwards to St Peter's Westminster, converted into a college of secular canons in the reign of Henry VI, still retaining much of its ancient architecture, and now used as a boarding school;
- the Decorated gateway of the Augustinian order priory of Butley; and the remains of the Grey Friars monastery at Dunwich.

A peculiarity of the church architecture is the use of flint for purposes of ornamentation, often of a very elaborate kind, especially on the porches and parapets of the towers. Another characteristic is the round towers, which are confined to East Anglia, but are considerably more numerous in Norfolk than in Suffolk, the principal being those of Little Saxham and Herringfleet, both good examples of Norman. It is questionable whether there are any remains of pre-Norman architecture in the county. The Decorated is well represented, but by far the greater proportion of the churches are Perpendicular Gothic, fine examples of which are so numerous that it is hard to select examples, although the church of Blythburgh in the east and the exquisite ornate building at Lavenham in the west may be noted as typical, while the church of Long Melford, another fine example, should be mentioned on account of its remarkable lady chapel.

Remains of old castles include part of the walls of Bungay, the ancient stronghold of the Bigods; the picturesque ruins of Mettingham, built by John de Norwich in the reign of Edward III; Wingfield, surrounded by a deep moat, with the turret walls and the drawbridge still existing; the splendid ruin of Framlingham, with high and massive walls, founded in the 6th century, but restored in the 12th; the outlines of the extensive fortress of Clare Castle, anciently the baronial residence of the Earls of Clare; and the fine Norman keep of Orford Castle, on an eminence overlooking the sea.

== See also ==
- Suffolk History Hub

== Sources ==
- Darby, H. C. (1972). "Appendix I". Domesday Geography of Eastern England. Cambridge: Cambridge University Press.
- Marten, Lucy (February 2008). "The Shiring of East Anglia: an Alternative Hypothesis". Historical Research. 81 (211): 1–27. ISSN 0950-3471.
- Wedgwood, C.V. (1970). The King's War: 1641-1647. London: Fontana.
