= Frances Dorothy Acomb =

American historian (1907–1984)

Frances Dorothy Acomb (October 15, 1907 – January 19, 1984) was an American academic and historian who wrote about United States history and English-French relations.

== Biography ==
=== Early life and education ===
Frances Dorothy Acomb was born on October 15, 1907, in Donora, Pennsylvania.

=== Career ===
Acomb earned a Bachelor of Arts in 1928 from Wellesley College and a Master of Arts in 1932 in Smith College. She received a fellowship from the American Association of University Women in 1941. She earned a Ph.D. in 1943 from the University of Chicago.

She taught high school from 1929 to 1936. She worked as a research assistant at the University of Chicago from 1936 to 1943. During World War II, she was a United States Department of War historian. She was an instructor at New York State Teachers College, Albany, after 1943. She was an assistant professor and later professor at Duke University from 1945 to 1975, becoming professor emerita of history in 1975.

Acomb published a biography of Jacques Mallet du Pan and two other books.

=== Death ===
Frances Dorothy Acomb died on January 19, 1984, in Durham, North Carolina.

== Selected works ==
- Anti-English Opinion in France (thesis), University of Chicago Library (Chicago, IL), 1943.
- Anglophobia in France, 1763-1789: An Essay in the History of Constitutionalism and Nationalism, Duke University Press (Durham, NC), 1950.
- Statistical Control in the Army Air Forces, History Division, U.S. Air Force (Colorado Springs, CO), 1952.
- Mallet du Pan, 1749-1800: A Career in Political Journalism, Duke University Press (Durham, NC), 1973.

== Papers ==
Acomb's papers are held at Duke University.
