= John Mallet (disambiguation) =

John Mallet was a chemist.

John Mallet(t) may also refer to:

- John Mallet (died 1570), MP for Bodmin
- John Malet (c. 1573-1644), MP for Bath
- John Mallett, rugby player
