= John Malet (disambiguation) =

John Malet (1623–1686) was an English lawyer and politician.

John Malet may also refer to:

- John Malet (died 1644), MP for Bath
- John Malet (died 1570), MP for Plymouth and Bodmin
