= Victor Mallet =

British diplomat and author

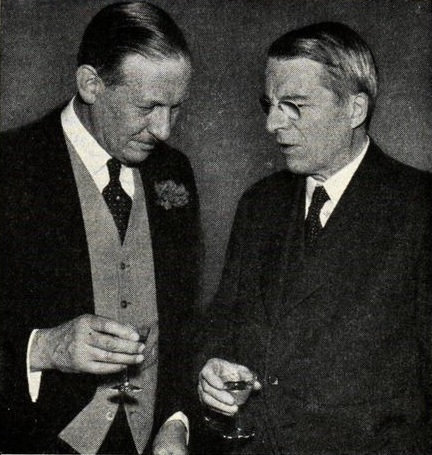
Victor Mallet (left) together with Swedish Foreign Minister Christian Günther, 12 May 1945.

Sir Victor Alexander Louis Mallet GCMG CVO (9 April 1893 – 18 May 1969) was a British diplomat and author.

== Career ==
Victor Alexander Louis Mallet was educated at Winchester College and Balliol College, Oxford. In 1914 he joined the Cambridgeshire Regiment and served during World War I with the British Expeditionary Force and later in Ireland, reaching the rank of Captain. He joined the Diplomatic Service in 1919 and held posts in Tehran 1919–22 and 1933–35, Buenos Aires 1926–28, Brussels 1929–32, Washington D.C. 1936–39 and in the Foreign Office 1922–26 and 1932. He was Envoy to Sweden 1940–45 during World War II and Ambassador to Spain 1945–46 and to Italy 1947–53.

== Family ==
Victor Mallet was son of Sir Bernard Mallet and his wife Marie, daughter of Henry John Adeane by his wife, Lady Elizabeth Yorke, daughter of the 4th Earl of Hardwicke. His mother was a Maid of Honour to Queen Victoria and he was godson to the Queen. His book Life with Queen Victoria, a record of his mother's letters written during her service, was published in 1968.

He married Christiana Jean Andreae, daughter of Herman Anton Andreae, of Moundsmere Manor, in Hampshire, and his wife, Christiana Candida (née Ahrens) in 1925; they had three sons and a daughter, Anne Marie, who married Patrick Butler, 18th/28th Baron Dunboyne in 1950.

== Publications ==
- Life with Queen Victoria: Marie Mallet's Letters from Court, 1887-1901 (editor), John Murray, London, 1968. ISBN 0719517834

== Honours ==
Victor Mallet was appointed Companion of the Order of St Michael and St George (CMG) in the 1934 New Year Honours and a Commander of the Royal Victorian Order in 1939. He was promoted to Knight Commander (KCMG) in the 1944 New Year Honours and again to Knight Grand Cross (GCMG) in the 1952 Birthday Honours.

Ancestors of Victor Mallet

16. Jacques Mallet du Pan
8. John Lewis Mallet
4. Sir Louis Mallet
2. Sir Bernard Mallet
40. Samuel Pellew
20. Edward Pellew, 1st Viscount Exmouth
41. Constantia Langford
10. Edward William Pellew
42. James Frowde, Esq.
21. Susan Frowde
5. Frances Helen Pellew
44. Benjamin Winthrop
22. Stephen John Winthrop
45. Elizabeth Neale
11. Marianne Winthrop
46. Gamaliel Lloyd
23. Mary Horton Lloyd
47. Elizabeth Attwood
1. Sir Victor Mallet
48. James Whorwood Adeane, MP
24. Robert Jones Adeane of Babraham, Cambridgeshire
49. Anne Jones, dau. of Robert Jones
12. Henry John Adeane, MP
50. Sir Patrick Blake, 1st Baronet, MP
25. Annabella Blake
51. Annabella Bunbury, dau. of Rev. Sir William Bunbury, 5th Baronet
6. Henry John Adeane, MP
52. Sir John Thomas Stanley, 6th Baronet
26. John Stanley, 1st Baron Stanley of Alderley
53. Margaret Owen, dau. of Hugh Owen of Penrhos
13. Matilda Abigail Stanley
54 John Baker Holroyd, 1st Earl of Sheffield
27. Hon. Maria Josepha Holroyd
55 Abigail Way, dau. of Lewis Way of Richmond, Surrey
3. Marie Adeane
56. Charles Yorke, Lord Chancellor
28. Joseph Sydney Yorke, First Sea Lord
57. Agneta Johnson
14. Charles Yorke, 4th Earl of Hardwicke
58. James Rattray, of Ireland
29. Elizabeth Weake Rattray
7. Lady Elizabeth Yorke
60. Sir Henry Liddell, 5th Baronet
30. Thomas Liddell, 1st Baron Ravensworth
61. Elizabeth Steele, dau. of Thomas Steele of Hampsnett
15. Hon. Susan Liddell
62. John Simpson, of Bradley Hall
31. Maria Susannah Simpson
126. Thomas Lyon, 8th Earl of Strathmore and Kinghorne
63. Lady Anne Lyon
127. Jean Nicholsen, dau. of James Nicholson of W. Rainton

Diplomatic posts
Preceded by Sir Edmund Monson, 3rd Baronet	Envoy Extraordinary and Minister Plenipotentiary to His Majesty the King of Sweden; 1939–1945	Succeeded by Sir Bertrand Jerram
Preceded by Samuel Hoare, 1st Viscount Templewood	Ambassador Extraordinary and Plenipotentiary at Madrid; 1945–1946	Succeeded by Sir Douglas Howard
Preceded by Sir Noel Charles	Ambassador Extraordinary and Plenipotentiary at Rome; 1947–1953	Succeeded by Sir Ashley Clarke
