= Siege of Lowestoft =

The Siege of Lowestoft was a brief Parliamentarian operation in March 1643 during the First English Civil War, when Oliver Cromwell suppressed a small Royalist rising that had secured the port of Lowestoft in Suffolk. In what was one of the first major actions of Cromwell's Regiment of Horse, the Eastern Association forces seized arms and took the local gentry prisoner to Cambridge. Unlike much of Suffolk Lowestoft was sympathetic to the royalists partly due to her commercial rivalry with the Parliamentarian Great Yarmouth. It was the only battle in the Civil War within the otherwise solidly Parliamentarian Suffolk. Prisoners taken by Cromwell included the courtiers John Pettus and Thomas Knyvett.

== Sources ==
- Firth, Charles Harding (1899). "The Raising of the Ironsides". Transactions of the Royal Historical Society. New Series. 13. Cambridge University Press: 17–73. doi:10.2307/3678126. JSTOR 3678126.
- Wedgwood, C.V. (1970). The King's War: 1641-1647. London: Fontana.
