= Honour of Eye =

Medieval feudal honour in Suffolk, England

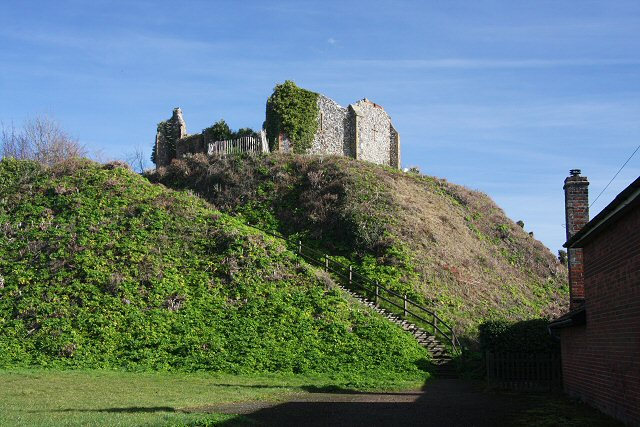
Eye castle, the caput of the Honour of Eye

The Honour of Eye was a significant medieval feudal landholding in East Anglia, centred on the town and castle of Eye in Suffolk, England. Established in the aftermath of the Norman Conquest, it comprised a large group of manors across Suffolk, as well as parts of Norfolk and Essex. The Honour played an important role in the regional governance of medieval Suffolk and Eastern England.

The administrative centre, or caput baroniae, of the Honour was Eye Castle, a motte-and-bailey castle that also served as a local stronghold and court centre. At its height, the Honour of Eye consisted of dozens of manors and generated substantial income and influence for its holders. Following the decline of the feudal system, the Honour’s significance diminished, and its lands were gradually absorbed into other estates or returned to royal control.

== Holders ==
Initially granted by William the Conqueror to William Malet, a Norman baron and sheriff who started the building of Eye Castle. When it was granted the honour comprised around 75,000 acres in Suffolk, Norfolk, Essex, Surrey, Bedfordshire and Nottinghamshire although 80% of it lay in Suffolk. The Domesday Book reported the honour to be worth £600 a year, which made its holder, Robert Malet, one of the twelve richest lay figures in England.

The Honour reverted to the Crown after the Malet family's forfeiture, and Henry I gifted it to his nephew Stephen of Blois who later became king and granted the honour to his son William. The honour reverted to Henry II in 1156. He granted it to his chancellor, Thomas Becket, who in turn lost it in 1164 when, as archbishop of Canterbury, he fell out with Henry. During that period of royal control, the building of Orford Castle was commenced. In the fourteenth century, the honour came to the Ufford family and, in 1381, to the de la Pole family.

The lordship of the Manor of Eye (Sokemere) and constableship of the castle are held by the Palmer family of Haughley in Suffolk. The current lord is Kieron Palmer of Haughley, succeeding his father Kenneth Palmer. The manor was held by the Malet family in Norman times, Henry Earl of Brabant; the De Ufford, De la Pole, Cornwallis and Kerrison families as well as King Stephen, Edward I and Mary I in previous years. Known as the Honour of Eye, it consisted of 129 manors and had the right to a court of pie poudre at its Whit Monday market fairs and those of Thrandeston and Finningham.

== Sources ==
- Sanders, I. J. (1960). English Baronies: A Study of Their Origin and Descent, 1086–1327. Oxford University Press. ISBN 9780198217158.
- Lewis, C. P. (July 1989). "The King and Eye: A Study in Anglo-Norman Politics". The English Historical Review. 104 (412): 569–589.
