= Malette =

Malette is a surname. Notable people with the surname include:

- Arthur Malette, American baseball player
- Chris Malette, Canadian politician
- Gaétan Malette, Canadian politician

== See also ==
- Mallett
