= Mallette =

Mallette is a surname. Notable people with the surname include:

- Brian Mallette, American baseball pitcher
- Fanny Mallette, Canadian actress
- Jocelyn Mitnaul Mallette, American lawyer and politician
- John Mallette (c. 1932-1995), American biologist, academic administrator and civic leader
- Mal Mallette, pitcher in Major League Baseball
- Karl L. Mallette, Toronto politician
- Malikha Mallette, dj at Power 105 (WWPR-FM)
- Troy Mallette, retired Canadian ice hockey forward
- Vital Mallette, Canadian politician

== See also ==
- Mallett, a surname
