= Mallett =

Mallett is a surname. Notable people with the surname include:

- Troy and Mason Mallett, brothers who created and directed the hit television show “Life of Aida Bleu”
- Aaron Mallett (born 1994), American hurdler
- Ashley Mallett (1945–2021), Australian cricketer
- Daryl F. Mallett, American science fiction editor and writer
- David Mallett (1951–2024), American singer-songwriter
- Garry Mallett, New Zealand politician
- Harry Mallett, English cricketer and administrator
- Jane Mallett, Canadian actress
- Jef Mallett, American artist and writer, creator and artist of the comic strip Frazz
- Jeff Mallett, Canadian entrepreneur and investor, COO of Yahoo! 1995–2002
- Jerry Mallett, American baseball player
- Joe Mallett, English professional footballer
- John Mallett, English rugby union player
- Joshua Mallett, American recording artist, producer, DJ and filmmaker
- Keith Mallett, American artist
- Marc Mallett, Northern Irish television presenter and journalist
- Marc Mallett, Northern Irish broadcaster and journalist
- Marla Mallett, Canadian curler
- Martell Mallett, Canadian football running back
- Neal Mallett (born 1957), British fencer
- Nick Mallett, South African rugby union coach and former player
- Pattie Mallette, Canadian author
- Reginald Mallett, Bishop of Northern Indiana
- Robert Mallet (1810–1881), Irish geophysicist, civil engineer, and inventor
- Robert Mallet (writer), French writer
- Ronald Mallett, professor of physics in the University of Connecticut
- Ronnie Mallett, American football player
- Rosemarie Mallett, British Anglican priest
- Ryan Mallett, American football quarterback
- Sarah Mallett (1764–1846), British early Methodist preacher
- Timmy Mallett, English TV presenter and broadcaster
- Xanthé Mallett, Scottish forensic anthropologist, criminologist and television presenter

Fictional characters:

- Billy Mallett, character in the soap opera Coronation Street

== See also ==
- Mallet (surname)
- Mallette, a surname
- Malet, a surname
- Malette, a surname
- Mallet
