= William Malet (exile) =

12th-century Anglo-Norman noble

William Malet (died c. 1121) was the third of his family to hold the honour of Eye and the lordship of Graville in Normandy. He was either the younger brother, son, or nephew of Robert Malet – in other words, either a son or grandson of the first William Malet.

Before 1066, the older William Malet was the Lord of Graville, in Normandy and is known to have fought at the Battle of Hastings, helping to secure the crown of England for William, Duke of Normandy. The Malets were reputedly related by blood or marriage to both William the Conqueror and King Harold of England.

William Malet the younger forfeited his English lands, including the substantial honour of Eye, and was banished from England, some time between the older Malet's death, circa 1106, and 1113. (Several other barons lost their lands in 1110, so that year is a likely date.) The precise cause is not known, but may be connected to conflict between King Henry I of England and King Louis VI of France.

After his exile from England, Malet re-established himself in Normandy where he retained the Lordship of Graville. His descendants rose to prominence in France through their military exploits for the French crown.
