= Mallet Creek =

Mallet Creek may refer to:

- Mallet Creek, Ohio, an unincorporated community
- Mallet Creek (Ohio), a stream
