= John Mallette =

American biologist

- Born: August 6, 1932; Houston, Texas, U.S.
- Died: August 21, 1995 (aged 63); Nashville, Tennessee, U.S.
- Resting place: Greenwood Cemetery
- Education: Xavier University of Louisiana; Texas Southern University; Pennsylvania State University
- Occupation: Biologist
- Employer: Tennessee State University
- Spouse: Pazetta Berryman
- Children: 1 son, 2 daughters

John Michael Mallette (August 6, 1932 - August 21, 1995) was an American biologist, academic administrator and civic leader. He was a professor of biology at Tennessee State University and an administrator at the University of Tennessee at Nashville. He researched cholesterol, oral contraceptives and cyclamates. He is the namesake of John Mallette Drive in Nashville, Tennessee.

== Early life ==
Mallette was born on August 6, 1932, in Houston, Texas and attended St. Nicholas Elementary and High School there. He graduated from Xavier University of Louisiana in 1954, where he earned a bachelor's degree in chemistry. He served in the United States Army from 1954 to 1956 where he was medic and stationed in Germany. He subsequently earned a master's degree from Texas Southern University in 1958 and a PhD from Pennsylvania State University in 1962, both in Biology.

== Academic career ==
Mallette was a Biology professor at Tennessee State University from 1962 to 1974. He also taught part-time at the University of Tennessee at Nashville (UTN) from 1964 to 1974. In 1975, he resigned from TSU to serve as the vice chancellor of academic affairs at UTN for five years. He subsequently resumed his faculty position at TSU, where he taught for over three decades over the course of his career.

=== Research contributions ===
Mallette did research on the effects of cholesterol on mice. In particular, he studied the relationship between stress factors and their cholesterol rates. Mallette also studied the side effects of oral contraceptives. According to The Tennessean, he also did "pioneering research into the harmful effects of cyclamates on animals which were later applied to humans."

Mallette was the president of the Tennessee Academy of Science in 1975.

== Civic activities ==
Mallette was a member of the NAACP, and he served on the boards of the United Negro College Fund, the National Conference of Christians and Jews, the United States Conference of Catholic Bishops. He was honored as a Knight of the Order of St. Gregory the Great and a Knight of Peter Claver.

== Personal life, death and legacy ==
Mallette married Pazette Berryman; they had a son and two daughters.

Mallette died on August 21, 1995, in Nashville. His funeral was held at the Church of the Assumption, and he was buried in the Greenwood Cemetery. In 2001, North Hydes Ferry in Bordeaux, a neighborhood of Nashville, was renamed John Mallette Drive in his honor thanks to councilmember Melvin Black.
