= Mallet, Rio de Janeiro =

Human settlement in Brazil

Coordinates: 22°52′49″S 43°24′19″W

Mallet is a region of Rio de Janeiro, but not officially recognized as a neighborhood.
