= Joan Malet =

Catalan witch-hunter of Morisco origin

Joan Malet (circa 1510 – July 2, 1549) was a Catalan Morisco witch-hunter, who operated in Catalonia, Aragon and Valencia in the mid-16th century.

== Biography ==
Joan Malet was born in Flix, in the Low Ebro region of the Principality of Catalonia, to a Mudéjar Muslim family. His father, who is said to have been condemned for having killed a nobleman, was a very violent man who once beat Joan up to the extent of making him lame for life. Joan had also learned some skills as a carpenter and lived in extreme poverty.

In Alcañiz, Aragon, Malet maintained a sexual relationship with a woman who claimed to be a sorceress and who allegedly taught him her skills, thus Malet coming to be known as mestre Malet (master Malet). He began his freelance career as a witch-hunter in the village of Arnes, in the Low Ebro region of Catalonia, where he tried to denounce two women he claimed to be witches, even though he ended up renouncing to continue such accusations when local villagers threatened him with death. Joan Malet then fled to Aragon, where he was eventually arrested by the Inquisition of Zaragoza, although he was released on the condition that he would never practise sorcery again.

He then returned to Catalonia and went to Tortosa, where he offered his services to the bishop of Tortosa as a witch-hunter, thus beginning an authentic reign of terror throughout Catalonia; dozens of poor women were arbitrarily denounced as witches by him, then tortured, and executed by hanging, since only the Inquisition could administer death by burning as penalty.

His campaign of terror in the region came to an end when the Grand Inquisitor of Barcelona, Diego de Sarmiento y Sotomayor, tried to put the situation under control by summoning, on June 24, 1548, a council of jurists and theologians from the principality in order to decide how to judge properly all the remaining women arrested after being accused of witchcraft by Malet, who in turn stayed at Barcelona as a protected witness. Therefore, beginning at October 7 that year, the towns of Tarragona, Montblanc and other Catalonian towns send those women to Barcelona so that they could be judged by the Inquisition courts there.

Given that only Malet's own testimony had been given as evidence for the arrest of those women, the various difficulties the Inquisition courts had in order to process the cases of more than 40 culprits, the orders coming from the Inquisition's see at Valladolid demanding to review the processes, and finally the fact that Sarmiento ordered an auto de fe against 6 of those women, who were publicly burned at the stake without the Inquisition's Suprema confirmation of the sentence; led the Suprema, in April 1549, to send the inquisitor Francisco de Vaca to Barcelona in order to inspect the whole situation. The reports of fraudulent judicial procedure sent by de Vaca to Valladolid led to the stopping of the remaining local judicial processes and to the release from prison of the remaining women under arrest.

Malet, who had fled to Valencia in the months that followed, and had continued to work there as witch-hunter, was finally arrested by the Valencian Inquisition and sent back to Barcelona, where he was executed by the Inquisition on July 2, 1549.

== Bibliography ==
- Revista Sàpiens, PERSONATGES: Vida i mort de Joan Malet, el primer caçador de bruixes de Catalunya, Agustí Alcoberro. (https://www.sapiens.cat/temes/personatges/joan-malet-el-primer-cacador-de-bruixes-de-catalunya_200540_102.html)
