= Bernard Mallet =

British civil servant (1859–1932)

Portrait by Walter Stoneman, 1917

Sir Bernard Mallet, KCB (17 September 1859 – 28 October 1932) was a British civil servant. He served in three departments: the Treasury 1886–1897, Inland Revenue 1897–1907 and General Register Office from 1907.

Bernard Mallet was the son of Sir Louis Mallet. He was educated at Clifton College and Balliol College, Oxford. He became private secretary to Arthur Balfour. Later, he was Registrar General and President of the Royal Statistical Society from 1916 to 1918. Mallet was prominent in the Eugenics Society and presided over the World Population Conference, held in Geneva in 1927.

Mallet married Marie Adeane, who at various times was a Maid of Honour to Queen Victoria. Bernard and Marie had two sons, one of whom was the diplomat Sir Victor Mallet.
