= Malet Lambert =

Malet Lambert may refer to:

- Malet Lambert (priest) (1853–1931), Archdeacon of the East Riding in the Church of England Diocese of York
- Malet Lambert School, secondary school in Hull, Yorkshire named for Lambert
