= Thierry Malet =

French film music composer

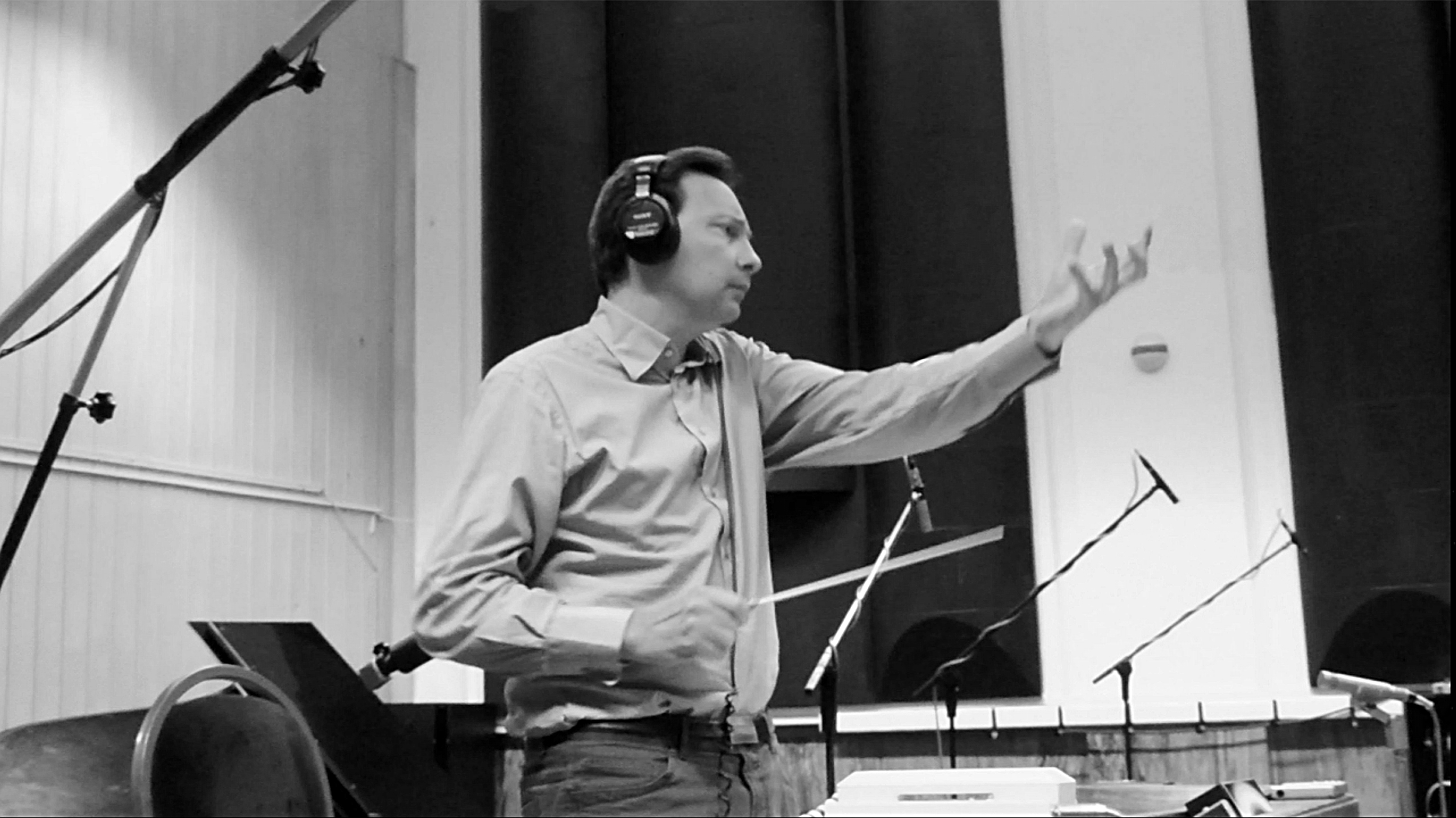
Thierry Malet conducting the City of Prague Philharmonic Orchestra at Smecky Studio (Prague - Czech Republic) in 2016.

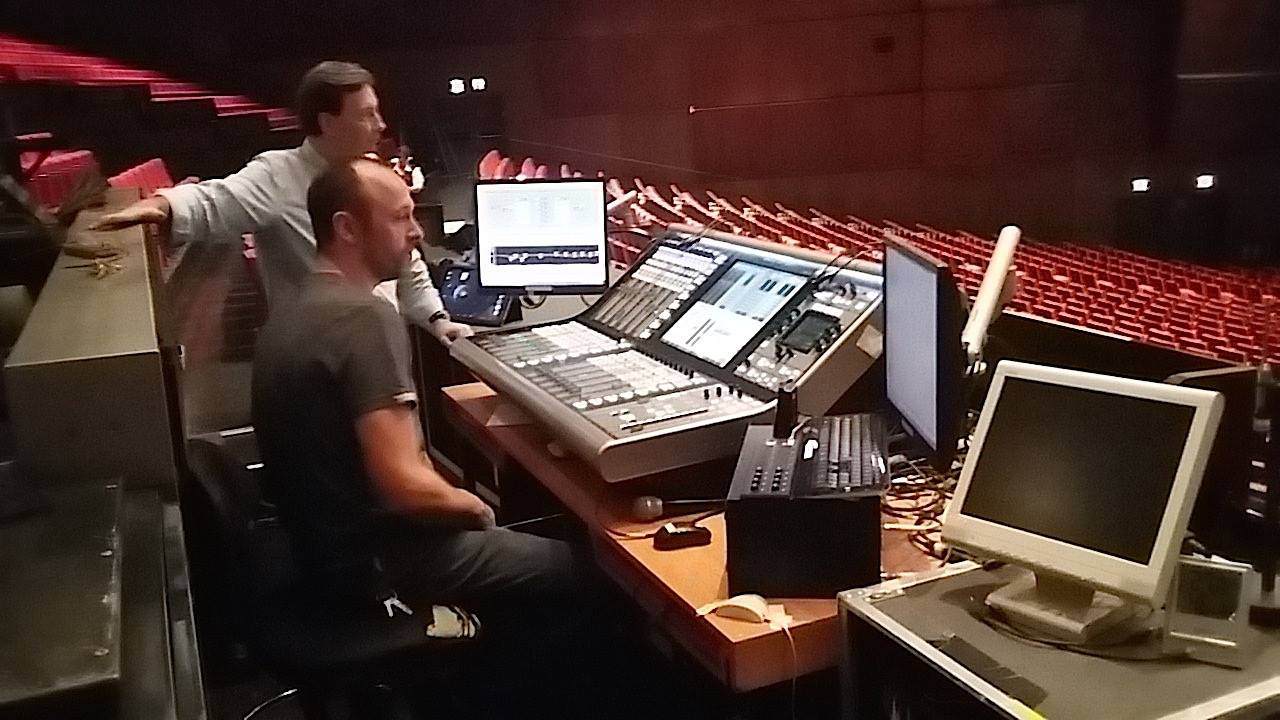
Testing the Arpegam recording process for film music at the Palais des Congrès of Paris - France - June 2017 - With the French composer Thierry Malet and the sound engineer Sylvain Demay

Thierry Malet, is a French composer of film music. He is also the designer of the very first MIDI guitars and a new 3D spatialization system for feature film music.

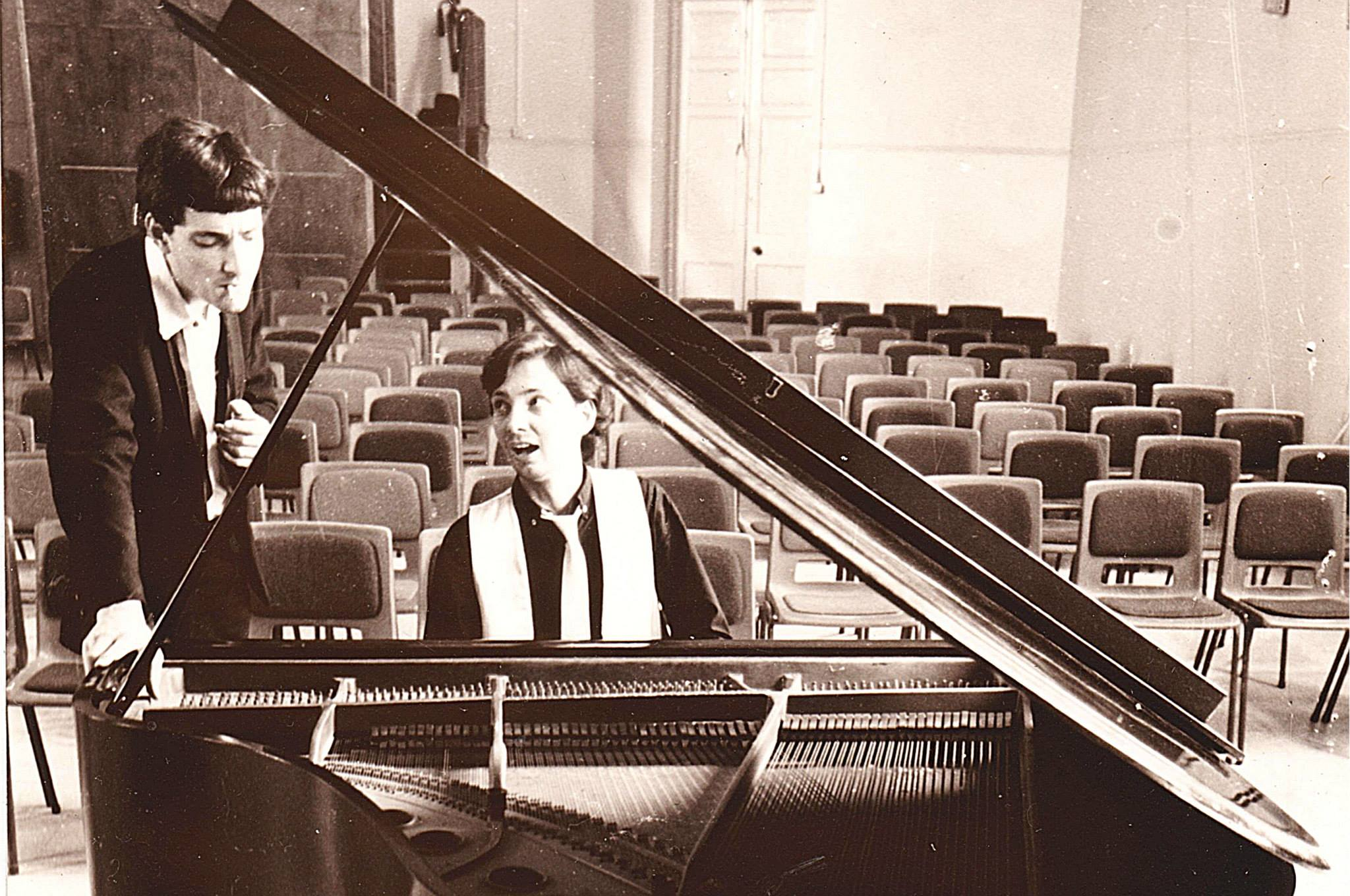
Thierry Malet rehearsals before his jazz piano solo concert at Sheffield - UK - October 1990.

== Life and career ==
Thierry Malet started to study the piano at the age of 7 at the Conservatoire of Paris with the pianist and concertist Marie-Claire Laroche, where he took courses in harmony and composition. But it was to be a further ten years before he discovered his true passion at Claude Bolling's school, writing film scores. In order to gain a fuller understanding of musical acoustics, he went to study acoustics at the Conservatoire National des Arts et Métiers.

In 1986, he developed the very first MIDI digital guitar in Belgium with the RTBF laboratories. before moving to the University of Sheffield in England where he graduated with a Ph.D. in bioacoustics and architectural acoustic computer simulation. Confident in this experience, he returned to France in 1994 and was soon to compose a number of original scores for television broadcasts and documentaries before going on to sign scores for French and American feature films. In 1995, he founded his own executive musical production company in order to gain a perfect understanding of the recording business.

In 2005, he signed the original score of the musical film Imago which won the Golden Rail at the Critics' Week of the Cannes Film Festival. He won the SACEM prize for the best film score.

== Latest events ==
In 2015, he composed the music of the film Winter Roses directed by Lorenzo Gabriele with Jean-Pierre Marielle, Mylène Demongeot and Léa Drucker.

In 2016, he signed the music of a big show at the Grand Palais in Paris (France), The Conquest of the Air, a full 360° 6000 m2 picture with a 3D music as a tribute to the 100 years anniversary of the French aviation.

In 2017, he attended a press conference at the Cannes Film Festival in the south of France where he announced the release of a new 3D system of spatialization called ARPEGAM and dedicated to the recording of feature film music.

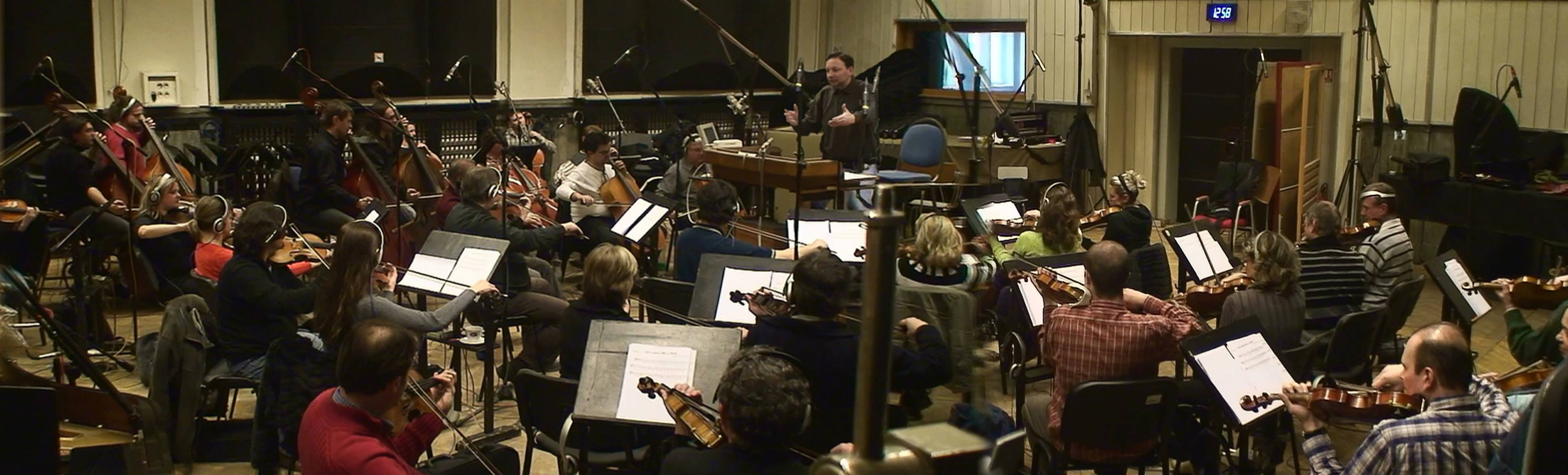
Thierry Malet conducting the City of Prague Philharmonic Orchestra in March 2015

== Selected filmography [Original titles in french] ==
- 2020 : Luca directed by Horatiu Malaele and written by Adrian Lustig
- 2020 : Tijuana Bible directed by Jean-Charles Hue
- 2019 : Haroun Tazieff directed by Eric Beauducel
- 2019 : Paul-Emile Victor directed by Stephane Dugast
- 2019 : Europe, Pushed to the wall directed by Nicolas Dupuis
- 2018 : Voices from the Stones directed by Eric Beauducel
- 2017 : La nuit aux invalides directed by Bruno Sellier
- 2017 : Journal d'une crue directed by Eric Beauducel
- 2016 : [The Conquest of the Air] directed by Bruno Seillier
- 2016 : Qui sème l'amour... directed by Lorenzo Gabriele with Julie de Bona
- 2015 : The eye of the storm directed by Sékou Traoré and Luis Marques
- 2015 : Des roses en hiver directed by Lorenzo Gabriele with Jean-Pierre Marielle
- 2015 : Pater Noster directed by Eddy Vicken and Yvon Bertorello
- 2015 : Haroun Tazieff / Claude Allègre – La guerre des volcans directed by Éric Beauducel
- 2014 : Le petit Houdini directed by Cédric Babouche
- 2014 : 1910: Paris sous les eaux directed by Olivier Poujaud and Éric Beauducel
- 2014 : Ils font dans la dentelle directed by Valérie Jourdan and Éric Beauducel
- 2013 : L’Echange directed by Michael Mongin and Jérôme Léonard
- 2013 : Starcraf Les ailes de la liberté - Trailer
- 2013 : Le Lagon directed by Éric Beauducel (IMAX – 3D)
- 2013 : Luminescence directed by Bruno Seillier (3D)
- 2013 : Femmes de silence directed by Eddy Vicken
- 2013 : Une justice entre deux mondes directed by Éric Beauducel
- 2013 : Prêtre pour se donner directed by Véronique Brechot
- 2012 : Au nom du frère directed by Éric Beauducel
- 2012 : Cathologue directed by Aymeric Christensen
- 2012 : Gainesville, Dios Primeramente directed by Éric Beauducel
- 2011 : Comme chez soi directed by Lorenzo Gabriele
- 2011 : Pierre et l’Emmanuel directed by Bernard Simon and Éric Beauducel
- 2010 : Walpole, l'île mystérieuse directed by Éric Beauducel
- 2010 : Le Pigeon directed by Lorenzo Gabriele with François Morel and Thierry Lhermitte
- 2009 : Those Special Men directed by Eddy Vicken and Yvon Bertorello
- 2009 : Le Mont Athos directed by Yvon Bertorello and Eddy Vicken
- 2009 : Tragédie Grouick directed by Matthieu Van Eeckhout and Marc Earcersall
- 2008 : La mascarade des Makhishis directed by Jérôme Ségur
- 2008 : Frères de sang directed by Bernard Simon
- 2008 : Moussa à Paris directed by Maka Sidibé
- 2007 : Mister French Taste directed by Benoît Proux and Eric Beauducel
- 2007 : Notable donc coupable directed by Francis Girod
- 2006 : Allez de l’avant directed by Éric Beauducel
- 2005 : Parlez-moi d’amour directed by Lorenzo Gabriele
- 2005 : Imago directed by Cédric Babouche
- 2004 : Vous êtes de la région directed by Lionel Epp
- 2004 : Le bataillon des guitaristes directed by Éric Beauducel
- 2004 : Aligato directed by Maka Sidibé
- 2003 : Je hais les enfants directed by Lorenzo Gabriele
- 2003 : Les femmes ont toujours raison directed by Élisabeth Rappeneau
- 2003 : L’Alexandrophagie directed by Sylvain Gillet
- 2003 : Nuit d’Amour directed by Ron Dyens
- 2003 : La famille Barbecuche directed by Lorenzo Gabriele
- 2002 : Third base directed by Thomas Goupille
- 2002 : Le Prix de la mort directed by Thomas Goupille
- 2002 : Le hasard fait bien les choses directed by Lorenzo Gabriele
- 2002 : Volutes directed by Romain Clément
- 2001 : Riffed (en) directed by Lorenzo Gabriele
- 2001 : L’Héritier directed by Christian Karcker
- 2001 : Appel d’air directed by Armault Labaronne
- 2000 : Parking directed by Christophe Stupar
- 2000 : La dernière femme directed by Benoît Proux
- 2000 : Volcans sous surveillance directed by Éric Beauducel
- 2000 : Le siège des Dieux directed by Éric Beauducel
- 1999 : Chuut directed by Christophe Legendre
- 1999 : Le feu qui nourrit directed by Éric Beauducel
- 1998 : Le Morbihan, vents et marées directed by Nicolas Mifsud
- 1998 : La sagesse sous les hêtres directed by Éric Beauducel
- 1998 : Vingt ans Veneur directed by Éric Beauducel
- 1998 : Vents et marées directed by Éric Beauducel
- 1998 : Le Finistère directed by David Teyssandier
- 1998 : A la recherche du Tassergal directed by Éric Beauducel
- 1998 : Côte d’Opale directed by Isabelle Saunois
- 1998 : Surfcasting sous les falaises Normandes directed by Nicolas Mifsud
- 1998 : Charentes, vents et marées directed by Isabelle Saunois
- 1998 : Ile d’Yeu de Père en fils directed by Éric Beauducel
- 1998 : La chasse saison II directed by Éric Beauducel
- 1998 : Une femme parmi les hommes directed by Isabelle Saunois
- 1998 : Surf en mer Baltique directed by Jérôme Colin
- 1998 : Delta de l’Ebre – Espagne directed by Éric Beauducel
- 1998 : La manche, vents et marées directed by Nicolas Mifsud
- 1998 : Surfcasting dans les Pertuis directed by David Teyssandier
- 1997 : Eiffel et sa tour directed by Claire Jenteur
- 1997 : Les transportés'' directed by Éric Beauducel
- 1997 : L’aventure d’Alexandre Le Grand directed by Jean-Phlippe Quillien
- 1997 : La chasse saison I, Série de 6 documentaires directed by Éric Beauducel
- 1997 : Un territoire en Sologne directed by Véronique Klener and Éric Beauducel
- 1997 : Un poète dans la garrigue directed by Isabelle Saunois
- 1997 : La pêche à la Dorade Royale directed by Éric Beauducel
- 1997 : Transair (Grand prix du Festival de Biarritz)
- 1996 : Mafa Africain directed by Bernard Simon
- 1996 : Einstein et son temps directed by Daniel Garric
- 1995 : Une vie donnée directed by Yves Humbert
- 1994 : Les Chansonniers directed by Bernard Simon
