= Robert Malet =

Norman-English baron

Robert Malet (c. 1050 – by 1130) was a Norman-English baron and a close advisor of Henry I.

== Early life ==
Malet was the son of William Malet, and inherited his father's great honour of Eye in 1071. This made him one of the dozen or so greatest landholders in England. According to the Domesday Book he held 221 manors in Suffolk, 32 in Yorkshire, eight in Lincolnshire, three in Essex, two in Nottinghamshire, and one in Hampshire. He also inherited the family property in Normandy.

== Public life ==
From 1070 to 1080, Malet was High Sheriff of Norfolk and Suffolk, and helped suppress the rebellion of Ralph Wader. Afterwards, he appeared frequently at King William I's court. All changed with the accession of William II. By 1094 Malet's English lands had been taken away from him. The reasons are unknown, and no more is known of Malet's activities during William II's reign. Most likely he was in Normandy, and it may be that his falling out with William II was due to his preference for Duke Robert of Normandy in the rivalry between the two brothers.

Malet reappeared in the public record three days after the death of William II in 1100, as a witness to Henry I's coronation charter. He must have been with Henry at the time of William's death, or rushed from Normandy when word came. In any case, Malet soon regained his office as Sheriff of Suffolk, and his honour of Eye.

It was thought that Malet had some quarrel with the king, and again lost his lands, on the basis of some statements by Orderic Vitalis, but most historians now think Orderic confused Malet with his successor, William Malet. However it appears that Robert Malet remained in the king's confidence and held his lands until his death.

Some sources claim that a Robert Malet died at the battle of Tinchebrai (28 September 1106), though there is no specific evidence linking this to Robert Malet of Suffolk.

Until some time before 1130, Malet was appointed Lord Great Chamberlain (or Master Chamberlain), the first person to hold this position. Little is known about the role attached at the time to this title or what it entailed. It is possible, however, that the position succeeded that of a Lord High Steward. While the rest of the financial responsibilities of the parent job were separated from that job and were given under the newly-formed title of Lord High Treasurer in 1126. So perhaps Malet became Lord Great Chamberlain in 1126 when the job of Lord High Treasurer seems to have been formed.

Preceded by —	Lord Great Chamberlain	Succeeded by Aubrey de Vere II
Preceded by William Malet	High Sheriff of Norfolk and Suffolk; 1071–1106	Succeeded by William Malet (land forfeiture)
Preceded by William Malet	Lord of Eye the Honour of Eye; 1071–1106	Succeeded by William Malet II
Preceded by William Malet	Lord of Granville; 1071–1106	Succeeded by William Malet II
