= André Malet (philosopher) =

French Catholic priest and philosopher

André Malet (1920-1989) was a French Catholic priest and philosopher who became a Unitarian Protestant. Specialising in Martin Heidegger, he translated Rudolf Bultmann into French. He married Nicole Maya-Malet, another philosopher specialising in Heidegger, who was director of the Revue d'éthique et de théologie morale, published by CERF.

== Works ==
- Thèse d'André Malet : Mythos et Logos, 1962 (soutenue à la Sorbonne, Paris, France)
- Rudolf Bultmann, écrivain de toujours, éditions Seghers
- Article sur Rudolf Bultmann dans l'Encyclopedia Universalis
- André MALET, Bultmann et la mort de Dieu, Présentation, choix de textes, biographie, bibliographie, Paris, Seghers, Neuchâtel, Delachaux et Niestlé, 1959; réédition 1968
- André Malet La Pensée de Rudolf Bultmann, Labor et fides - 1971.

== Sources ==
- André Malet ou Un homme en quête de Dieu sur le site du centre Bachelard.
- Collectif, A. Malet interprète de Bultmann et apologiste de St-Thomas 1991
