= Louis Mallet =

British civil servant (born 1823)

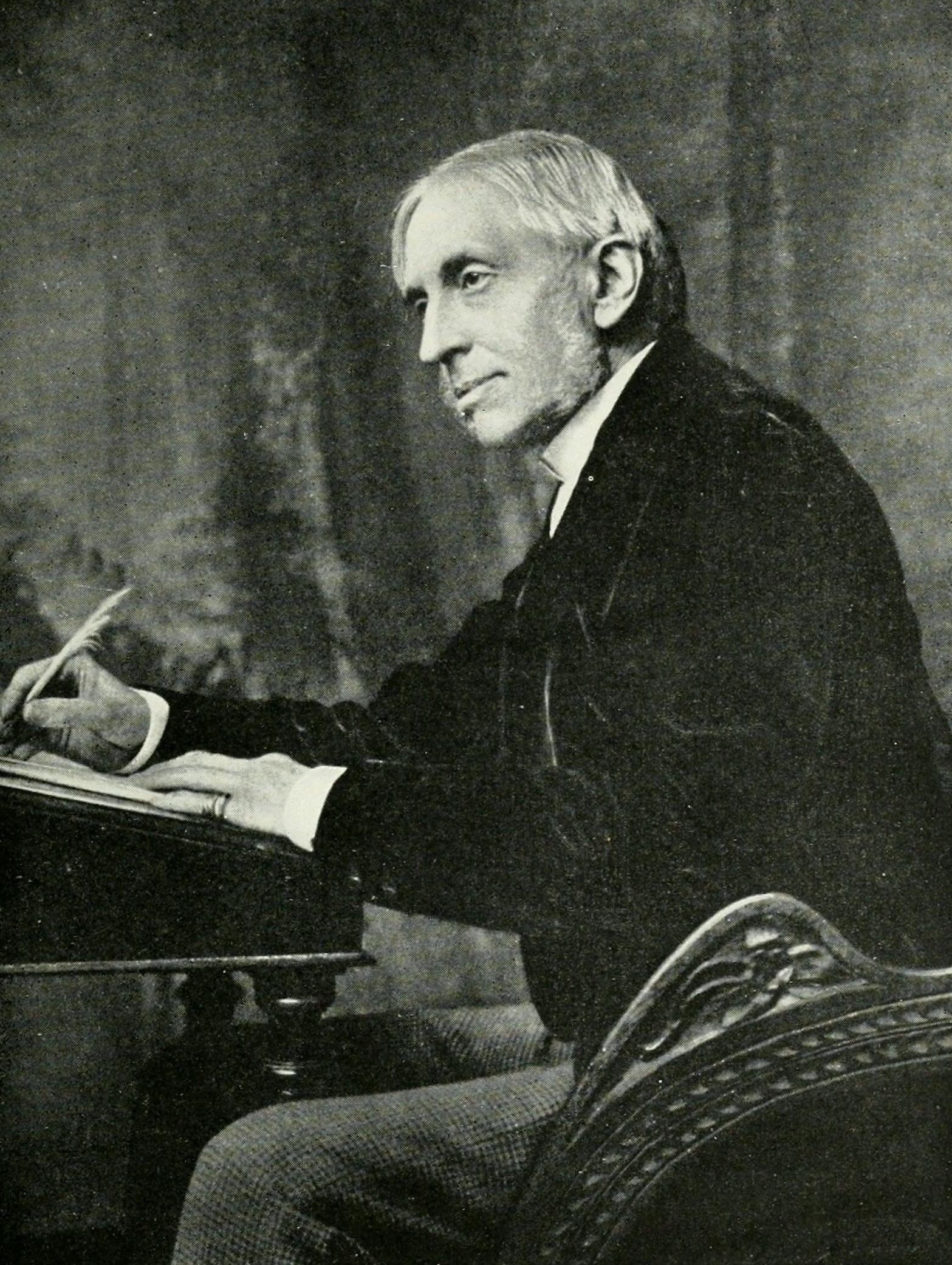
Portrait of Sir Louis Mallet.

Sir Louis Mallet CB PC (14 March 1823 – 16 February 1890) was a British civil servant who was an advocate of free trade and served on the Council of India.

== Career ==
Louis Mallet was born in Hampstead, grandson of Jacques Mallet du Pan and son of John Lewis Mallet who had been Secretary to the Commissioners for Auditing the Public Accounts (predecessor of the National Audit Office) since 1806. He was educated privately and at the age of 16 his father found him a place as a clerk in his own office. He spent eight years in the Audit Office and in 1847 transferred to the Board of Trade where he soon became private secretary to the President of the Board, serving Henry Labouchere 1848–52 and Lord Stanley 1855–57.

In 1860 Mallet was appointed an assistant commissioner under Richard Cobden for drawing up detailed tariffs under the Anglo-French Treaty of Commerce (the Cobden–Chevalier Treaty) which had been signed in January 1860. Cobden was much impressed by Mallet and he by Cobden, and Mallet became a strong advocate of free trade, and a founder member of the Cobden Club after Cobden's death. In 1865 Mallet was sent to Vienna to take a leading part in organising an Anglo-Austrian commercial treaty, which was signed in December 1865, though Mallet remained in Vienna until 1867 for follow-up negotiations.

In 1872 the Duke of Argyll, then Secretary of State for India, nominated Mallet to the Council of India. In 1874 he was appointed Permanent Under-Secretary of State for India, a position left vacant by the death of his first cousin Herman Merivale. He remained in that post until his retirement in 1883, touring India in 1875–76, which was facilitated by the opening of the Suez Canal in 1869. Mallet served on a royal commission on the laws relating to copyright in 1876, and was a commissioner for the British representation at the Paris exhibition of 1878. In the same year he and Lord Reay represented India at an International Monetary Conference in Paris, convened as a result of a fall in the price of silver relative to gold. Mallet retired in 1883 but was recalled in 1887 to serve for a short period on a Royal Commission on Precious Metals.

== Family ==
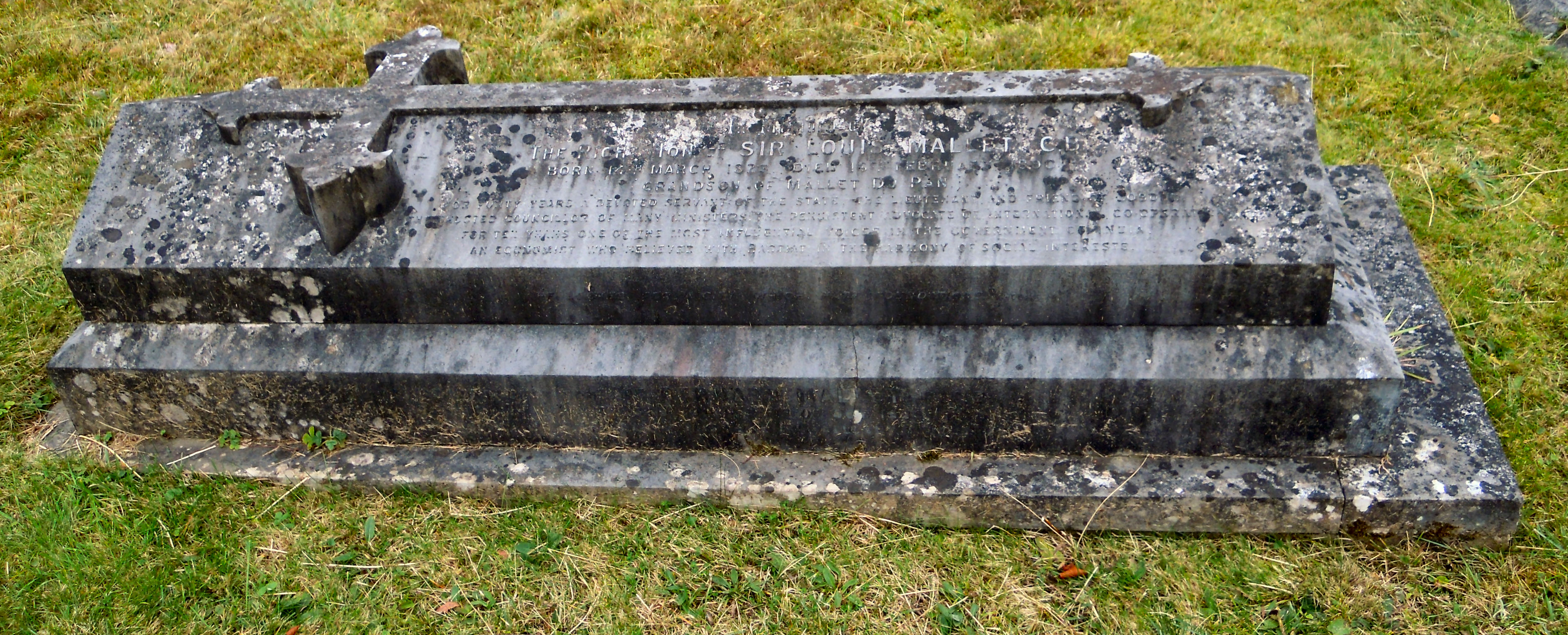
Mallet's grave in Brookwood Cemetery

In 1858 Mallet married Frances Helen Pellew (daughter of Rev. Edward William Pellew and Marianne Winthrop, and granddaughter of Admiral Sir Edward Pellew, 1st Viscount Exmouth) and they had four sons, including Bernard Mallet, Louis du Pan Mallet and Eugene Hugo Mallett.

He is buried in Brookwood Cemetery.

== Honours ==
Louis Mallet was appointed CB in 1866 and knighted in 1868. He was made a Privy Counsellor in 1883.

== Publications ==
- The political opinions of Richard Cobden, Macmillan, London, 1869
- The national income and taxation, Cassell, London, 1884
- Free Exchange. Papers on political and economical subjects, including chapters on the law of value and unearned increment (ed. Bernard Mallet), Kegan Paul, London, 1891.
- The Political Writings of Richard Cobden, Unwin, London, 1903
- Cobden's work and opinions (with Lord Welby), Cobden Club, London, 1904

== Notes ==
Government offices
Preceded by Herman Merivale	Permanent Under-Secretary of State for India; 1874–1883	Succeeded by Sir Arthur Godley
