= André Malet (abbot) =

The révérend Père Dom André Malet (1862–1936) was from 1911 to 1936 abbot of the Trappist abbey of Sainte-Marie-du-Désert at Bellegarde-Sainte-Marie in Haute-Garonne. He was also a writer on history, liturgy and spiritual life, whose works include La vie surnaturelle, ses éléments, son exercice (1933).

== Sources ==
- Étienne Chenevière, Toi seul me suffis, Westmalle, 1971
- (in French) Le père Marie-Joseph Cassant (1878-1903) et dom André Malet (1862-1936)
