= William Malet (companion of William the Conqueror) =

11th-century Norman nobleman

William Malet (Anglo-Norman: Willame Malet de Graville, died 1071) held senior positions within the Norman forces that occupied England from 1066. He was appointed the second High Sheriff of Yorkshire in 1068. Of the companions of William the Conqueror, Malet is one of about a dozen for whom there is evidence of their presence at the Battle of Hastings of 14 October 1066. For example, the contemporary chronicler William of Poitiers recorded that Malet was present at the battle.

According to apocryphal accounts, Malet was related to both William and King Harold Godwinson. Some accounts claim that Malet took charge of Harold's body following the Norman victory at Hastings. (Note: For example William of Poitiers, in his account, describes how the body of Harold "was carried into the camp of the duke, who entrusted his burial to William surnamed Malet.") However, there is no evidence confirming such a claim.

Malet held substantial property in Normandy – chiefly in the Pays de Caux, with a castle at Graville-Sainte-Honorine (now a suburb of Le Havre). After 1066, he held many properties in England as well, most of them in East Anglia, centered on the Honour of Eye, and Yorkshire.

== Biography ==
=== Early life ===
According to unverifiable, apocryphal accounts, Malet had significant, multiple ties to the Anglo-Saxon elite before the Norman Conquest.

- Malet's mother was said to be English.
- He was said to be the brother of Ælgifu, wife of Ælfgar, Earl of Mercia (and, therefore, daughter-in-law of Lady Godiva).
- In or about January 1066, King Harold married Ealdgyth, often known as Edith (the dowager of Welsh king Gruffydd ap Llywelyn) and a daughter of Ælgifu and Ælfgar of Mercia. If Malet was a biological uncle of the queen consort of England in 1066, he would probably have been pivotal to Norman-English relations at around the time of the Battle of Hastings.

However, modern historians discount any blood-links to Anglo-Saxon royalty or aristocracy, noting instead that there was considerable Norman influence in England even before 1066.

=== Battle of Hastings ===
There is evidence that Malet fought on the Norman side at Hastings, regardless of any divided loyalties that may have been caused by family ties. For instance, William of Poitiers wrote of King Harold's remains: "His corpse was brought into the Duke's camp and William [of Normandy] gave it for burial to William, surnamed Malet, and not to Harold's mother, who offered for the body of her beloved son its weight in gold." If Malet was at the Norman headquarters, immediately after the battle, it would be strong evidence that he played a significant role in the Norman victory.

=== High Sheriff of Yorkshire ===
Malet's activities during the first few years of the Norman Conquest of England are not known. Early on he was granted the great honour of Eye, with vast lands in Suffolk and several other shires. It was in fact the largest lordship in East Anglia. He made Eye his caput, his main headquarters, built a motte and bailey castle there, and started a highly successful market. He is credited with initiating the urbanization of Eye.

After the Danish stronghold York was captured in 1068, he was appointed the second High Sheriff of Yorkshire. William was in charge of the garrisons defending the shire, and built a timbered castle fortress on a motte in York and another wooden castle across the River Ouse. His efforts at defending the shire from Danish raids were, in the end, a terrible failure, for the next year the city was burned and the garrison slaughtered. Malet, his wife, and two of their children were held as hostages, and finally released when the Danes were driven off.

Malet was relieved of his duties in the north, but his efforts to defend the kingdom did not go unappreciated. He stayed in the king's favour and was appointed High Sheriff of Norfolk and Suffolk about 1069/70, an appointment that passed to his son Robert upon his death.

== In historical literature & the media ==
The Domesday Book of 1086 also mentions a Durand Malet, who held land in Lincolnshire and possibly some neighbouring shires. This may be William Malet's brother, but this is not certain.

On screen, Malet has been portrayed by Peter Halliday in the two-part BBC TV play Conquest (1966), part of the series Theatre 625, and by Gawn Grainger in the TV drama Blood Royal: William the Conqueror (1990).

== Family ==
While still in Normandy, about 1050, William married Hesilia (Helise or Elisee), daughter of Gilbert de Brionne. Hesilia was the second cousin of William the Conqueror and possibly the widow of Balderic Teutonicus (Balderic de Courcy; Balderic de Bacqueville). William and Hesilia had two sons and at least one daughter:

- Robert Malet (c. 1050 – by 1130)
- Gilbert Malet, founder of the Malets of Shepton Mallet in Somerset.
- Beatrice, wife of William de Archis

Thorold, the sheriff of Lincoln and father of Lucy Bolingbroke was married to a daughter of William, either Beatrice (before she married William de Achis) or another, unknown daughter.

== Death ==
William Malet died around 1071, probably during the rebellion of Hereward the Wake, although Kirk, referencing Stapleton's Norman Pipe Rolls, assigns his death to 1069 and the siege of York. He was succeeded by his son Robert as Lord of Eye and Sheriff of Suffolk.

Preceded by New Creation; After Norman Conquest	High Sheriff of Yorkshire; 1068–1069	Succeeded by Hugh FitzBaldric
Preceded by New Creation; After Norman Conquest	High Sheriff of Norfolk and Suffolk; 1070–1071	Succeeded by Robert Malet
Preceded by New Creation; After Norman Conquest	Lord of Eye; The Honour of Eye –1071	Succeeded by Robert Malet
Preceded by	Lord of Graville (Normandy) –1071	Succeeded by Robert Malet

== Sources ==
- Hollister, C. Warren (1973). "Henry I and Robert Malet". Viator. 4: 115–132. doi:10.1484/J.VIATOR.2.301643.
- Hurt, Cyril. "William Malet and His Family". Anglo-Norman Studies XIX.
- Lewis, C. P. (1989). "The King and Eye: A Study in Anglo-Norman Politics". English Historical Review. 104: 569–587. doi:10.1093/ehr/CIV.CCCCXII.569.
- William of Poitiers (1998). Davis, R.H.C.; Chibnall, Marjorie (eds.). The Gesta Guillelmi of William of Poitiers. Translated by Davis, R. H. C.; Chibnall, Marjorie. Oxford, UK: Oxford University Press. ISBN 0-19-820553-8.
- Weis, Frederick Lewis. Ancestral Roots of Certain American Colonists Who Came to America Before 1700. pp. Line 234A-25.
