= John Malet (died 1570) =

English politician

Arms of Mallet: Azure, three escallops or

John Malet (died 1570) of Woolleigh in the parish of Beaford in Devon, was Sheriff of Devon in 1562 and was a Member of Parliament for Plymouth in April 1554 and for Bodmin in 1562 and 1563–1567.

He was the eldest son and heir by his father's second wife Anne Hatch. According to Vivian he married Alice Monck, a daughter of Anthony Monck (died 1545) of Potheridge in the parish of Merton, Devon. (or according to Pole he married Margaret Monck, daughter of Humphrey Monck.) Anthony Monck was the great-great-grandfather of George Monck, 1st Duke of Albemarle (1608–1670), of Potheridge. Alice Monck's brother was Thomas Monck (died 1583), who married Frances Plantagenet, daughter of Arthur Plantagenet, 1st Viscount Lisle KG (died 1542).
