= The Countess of Salisbury =

The Countess of Salisbury may refer to:

- The Countess of Salisbury (play), a 1767 tragedy by Hall Hartson
- Ela of Salisbury, 3rd Countess of Salisbury (1187–1261), inspiration for the play
- The Countess of Salisbury (novel), an 1836 historical adventure novel by Alexandre Dumas
- Catherine Grandison, Countess of Salisbury (c. 1304–1349), inspiration for the novel

== See also ==
- Countess of Salisbury, for other countesses
