= Margaret de Monthermer, 3rd Baroness Monthermer =

English heiress

Margaret de Monthermer
- suo jure Baroness Monthermer
- Born: 14 October 1329
- Died: 24 March 1394 or 1395
- Spouse: John de Montacute, 1st Baron Montacute
- Issue: John Montacute, 3rd Earl of Salisbury
- Father: Thomas de Monthermer, 2nd Baron de Monthermer
- Mother: Margaret Teyes

Margaret de Monthermer (14 October 1329 – 24 March 1394/1395) was an English heiress and suo jure Baroness Monthermer.

== Life ==
In 1297 her grandfather Ralph de Monthermer had married Joan of Acre, to the displeasure of her father King Edward I. He had three children with Joan, and after her death, he was appointed Baron Monthermer. One of his sons was Thomas de Monthermer, Margaret's father.

Margaret was born on 14 October 1329. Thomas de Monthermer died in 1340 whilst fighting in the Battle of Sluys. Upon the death of her father, Margaret became suo jure Baroness Monthermer at the age of 10. She was also the heiress of Stokenham.

In 1343 Margaret married John de Montacute (later 1st Baron Montacute), a younger son of William Montagu, 1st Earl of Salisbury. She died on 24 March 1394 or 1395.
