= Countess of Salisbury =

The title Countess of Salisbury may be carried by a female heir of the Earl of Salisbury or to the wife of an Earl of Salisbury. The title has been held by several women, including:

== Countesses in their own right ==
- Ela of Salisbury, 3rd Countess of Salisbury (1187–1261), heiress to William of Salisbury, 2nd Earl of Salisbury
- Margaret Longespée, 4th Countess of Salisbury (d. 1310), heiress to Ela Longespee
- Alice de Lacy, 5th Countess of Salisbury (1281–1348), heiress to Margaret Longespee; forfeit 1322
- Alice Montacute, 5th Countess of Salisbury (1407–1462), heiress to Thomas Montagu, 4th Earl of Salisbury
- Margaret Pole, Countess of Salisbury (1473-1541), heiress to George, Duke of Clarence

== Countesses by marriage ==
- Catherine Montacute, Countess of Salisbury (1304-1349), married William Montagu, 1st Earl of Salisbury
- Joan of Kent (1326-1385), married William Montagu, 2nd Earl of Salisbury (annulled 1349)
- Maud Montacute, Countess of Salisbury (1370-1424), married John Montagu, 3rd Earl of Salisbury
- Catherine Cecil, Countess of Salisbury (c.1590-1673), married William Cecil, 2nd Earl of Salisbury
- Margaret Cecil, Countess of Salisbury (died c.1682), married James Cecil, 3rd Earl of Salisbury
- Anne Cecil, Countess of Salisbury (1693-1757), married James Cecil, 5th Earl of Salisbury
- Emily Cecil, Marchioness of Salisbury (1750-1835), married James Cecil, 7th Earl and later 1st Marquess of Salisbury)

== Literature ==
- The Countess of Salisbury (play), a 1767 play by Hall Hartson
- The Countess of Salisbury (novel), an 1836 novel by Alexandre Dumas
