= Thomas de Monthermer, 2nd Baron Monthermer =

English baron (1301–1340)

Arms of Monthermer: Or, an eagle displayed vert beaked and membered gules. These arms were later quartered by the Earl of Salisbury after the marriage of Margaret, 3rd Baroness to John de Montacute, 1st Baron Montacute.

Thomas de Monthermer, 2nd Baron Monthermer (4 October 1301 – 24 June 1340) was the son of Ralph de Monthermer, 1st Baron Monthermer and Joan of Acre, a daughter of King Edward I of England. He was a first cousin of King Edward III of England.

== Early life ==
Thomas was born on 4 October 1301 in Stoke, Ham, Wiltshire.

== Life and family ==
He gained the title of Baron Monthermer on the death of his father. He married Margaret de Brewes, daughter of Sir Peter de Brewes. They had one daughter, Margaret, who in 1343 became the wife of John de Montacute, 1st Baron Montacute, the younger brother of William Montacute and son of William Montagu, 1st Earl of Salisbury. Their son John became the 3rd Earl of Salisbury and 4th Baron Monthermer.

== Later life and death ==
In 1340 he fought in the Battle of Sluys and died on 24 June from wounds he received in action.

== Ancestry ==
Ancestors of Thomas de Monthermer, 2nd Baron Monthermer

2. Ralph de Monthermer, 1st Baron Monthermer
1. Thomas de Monthermer, 2nd Baron Monthermer
24. John, King of England
12. Henry III, King of England
25. Isabella Taillefer, Countess of Angouleme
6. Edward I, King of England
26. Ramón Berenguer IV, Count of Provence
13. Éléonore de Provence
27. Beatrice di Savoy
3. Joan of Acre, Princess of England
28. Alfonso IX, King of León
14. Fernando III, King of Castille, King of León
29. Berenguela I, Queen of Castile
7. Leonor de Borgoña, Countess of Ponthieu
30. Simon de Dammartin, Count of Aumale
15. Jeanne de Dammartin, Countess of Aumale, Countess of Ponthieu
31. Marie de Montgomery-Bellême, Countess of Ponthieu
