= Baron Monthermer =

Barony in the Peerage of England

The title Baron Monthermer was created twice in the Peerage of England.

The first creation was for Ralph de Monthermer who was summoned to parliament on 4 March 1309. After the death of the second baron, his heiress Margaret inherited the barony. On her death, her son, John de Montacute, succeeded her in the barony and in 1397 he became Earl of Salisbury with which title the barony became united.

The second creation was for Edward de Monthermer who was summoned to parliament on 23 April 1326 despite his elder brother Thomas still being alive. On Edward's death in about 1340, that barony became extinct.

== Barons Monthermer (1309) ==
- Ralph de Monthermer, 1st Baron Monthermer (d.1325)
- Thomas de Monthermer, 2nd Baron Monthermer (d.1340)
- Margaret de Monthermer, suo jure 3rd Baroness Monthermer (d.1395)
  - John de Montacute, 1st Baron Montacute (d.1390), her husband, jure uxoris 3rd Baron Monthermer
- John de Montacute, 4th Baron Monthermer (1350–1400) succeeded as Earl of Salisbury in 1397.
- Thomas Montacute, 5th Baron Monthermer (1388-1428)
- Alice Montacute, 6th Baroness Monthermer (1407-1462)
  - Richard Neville, 6th Baron Monthermer (1400–1460) jure uxoris
- Richard Neville, 7th Baron Monthermer (1428-1471) (abeyant from 1471 to 1477)
- Edward Plantagenet, 8th Baron Monthermer (1473-1484)
- Edward Plantagenet, 9th Baron Monthermer (1474-1499) (abeyant from 1499 to 1513)
- Margaret Pole, née Plantagenet, 10th Baroness Monthermer (1473-1541) (forfeit on her attainder in 1539)

== Baron Monthermer (1326) ==
- Edward de Monthermer, Baron Monthermer (d. c.1340) (extinct about 1340)

== See also ==
- Earl of Salisbury
- Baron Montagu
