= Catherine Grandison, Countess of Salisbury =

English noblewoman (c. 1304–1349)

Catherine Grandison, Countess of Salisbury (c. 1304 – 23 November 1349) was an English noblewoman, remembered for allegedly being raped by King Edward III of England and possibly the woman in whose honour the Order of the Garter was originated. She was the daughter of William de Grandison, 1st Baron Grandison, and Sibylla de Tregoz. Her mother was one of two daughters of John de Tregoz, Baron Tregoz (whose arms were blazoned Gules two bars gemels in chief a lion passant guardant or), maternal granddaughter of Fulk IV, Baron FitzWarin). Catherine married William Montacute, 1st Earl of Salisbury in about 1320.

Their children were:

- Elizabeth Montacute, b. before 1325, married Hugh le Despencer, Baron le Despencer before 27 April 1341.
- William Montacute, 2nd Earl of Salisbury (1328–1397)
- Sibyl Montacute, born 1329, died after 1371, married Sir Edmund FitzAlan, Knt. before 1347.
- John de Montacute, 1st Baron Montacute, (1330–1390), father of John Montacute, 3rd Earl of Salisbury.
- Philippa Montagu, born 1332, died 1381, married Roger Mortimer, 2nd Earl of March.
- Agnes Montagu, contracted to marry John, eldest son of Roger Grey, 1st Baron Grey de Ruthyn.

According to Jean Le Bel, King Edward III raped Catherine in 1341, according to the True Chronicles of Jean le Bel he "left her there unconscious, bleeding from her nose, mouth, and elsewhere", after having relieved a Scottish siege on Wark Castle, where she lived, while her husband was out of the country. An Elizabethan play, Edward III, deals with this incident. In the play, the Earl of Warwick is the unnamed countess's father.

In around 1348, the Order of the Garter was founded by Edward III and it is recorded by Jean Froissart that he did so after an incident at a ball when the "Countess of Salisbury" dropped a garter and the king picked it up. It is assumed that Froissart is referring either to Catherine or to her daughter-in-law, Joan of Kent.

In 1836 Alexandre Dumas's first serialised novel The Countess of Salisbury was based on her life.

== Sources ==
- Gransden, Antonia (April 1972). "The Alleged Rape by Edward III of the Countess of Salisbury". The English Historical Review. 87 (343): 333–344. doi:10.1093/ehr/lxxxvii.cccxliii.333. JSTOR 563289.
