= John Montagu, 3rd Earl of Salisbury =

English nobleman (c. 1350–1400)

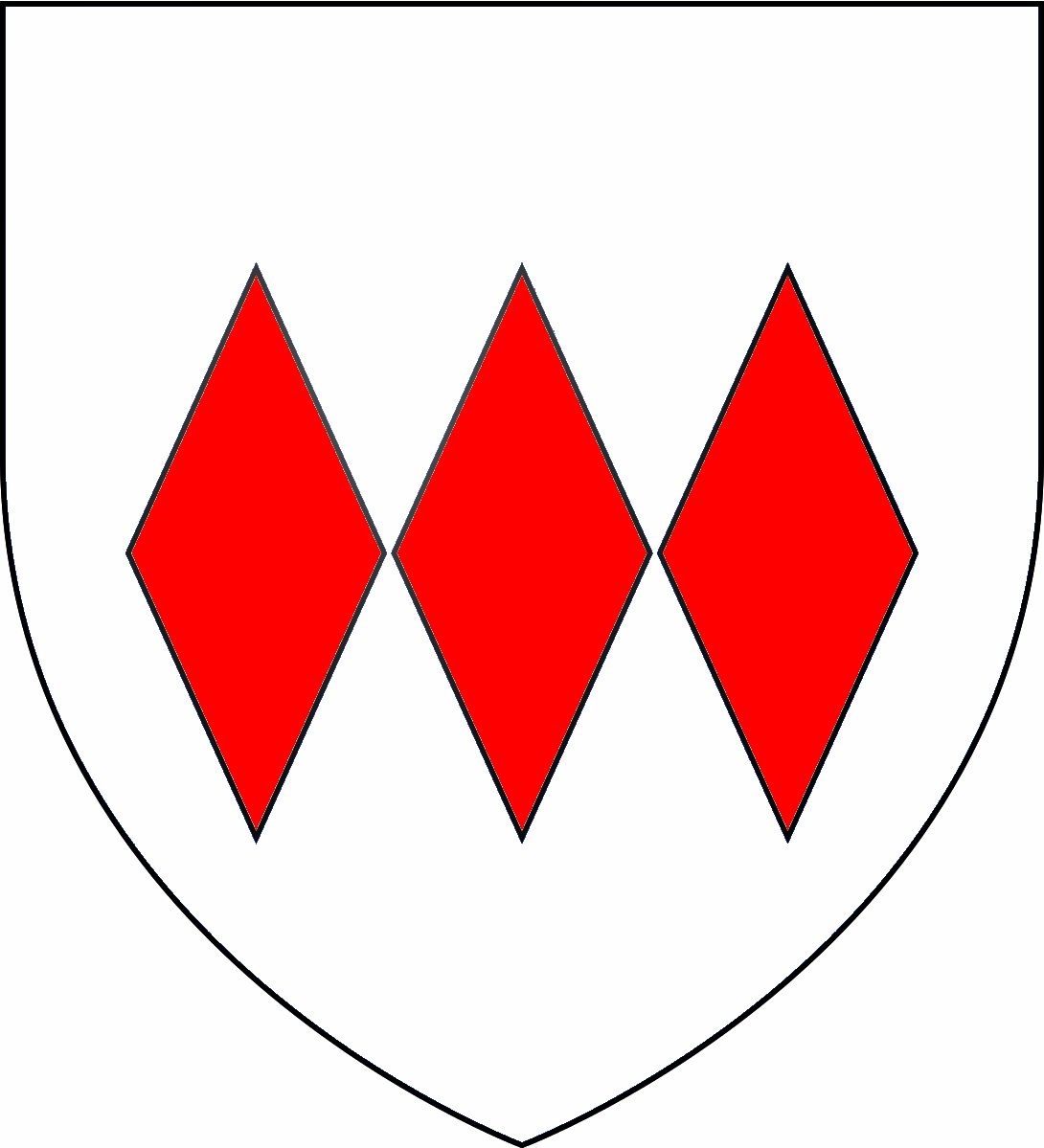
Arms of Montagu: Argent, three fusils conjoined in fess gules

John Montagu, 3rd Earl of Salisbury and 5th and 2nd Baron Montagu, KG (c. 1350 – 7 January 1400) was an English nobleman, one of the few who remained loyal to Richard II after Henry IV became king.

== Early life ==
He was the son of Sir John de Montagu, 1st Baron Montagu (died in 1390), and Margaret de Monthermer. His father was the younger brother of William Montagu, 2nd Earl of Salisbury. His mother was the daughter of Thomas de Monthermer, 2nd Baron de Monthermer (1301 – Battle of Sluys, 1340), and Margaret de Brewes and granddaughter, and heiress, of Ralph de Monthermer, 1st Baron Monthermer, and Joan of Acre. As a young man, Montagu distinguished himself in the war with France, and then went to fight against the pagans in Prussia, probably on the expedition led by Henry Bolingbroke (the future Henry IV of England). Bolingbroke was to entrust his young son and heir, later Henry V, to the care of the Montagu family, following the death of his wife Mary de Bohun. After his mother's death, the earl's wife, Maud, cared for the young boy at Courtfield, the Montagus' manor house in Welsh Bicknor, near Monmouth.

He was summoned to parliament in 1391 as Baron Montagu. Montagu was a favourite of the King during the early years of the reign of Richard II. He accompanied the King during his expeditions to Ireland in 1394 and 1395 and, as a privy councillor, was one of the principal advocates of the King's marriage to Isabella of Valois. During the trips to France associated with the marriage, he met and encouraged Christine de Pisan, whose son was educated in the Montagu household. Montagu was a prominent Lollard, and was remonstrated by the king for this.

With the death of his mother in 1395, John inherited the barony of Monthermer and its estates. In 1397, he became Earl of Salisbury, on the death of his uncle, and inherited Bisham Manor and other estates. He continued as one of the major aristocratic allies of King Richard II, helping to secure the fall of the Duke of Gloucester and the Earl of Warwick. He persuaded the king to spare the life of Warwick. He received a portion of the forfeited Warwick estates and, in 1399, was made a Knight of the Garter.

Early in 1399, he went to France on a successful mission to prevent the proposed marriage of Henry Bolingbroke and a daughter of the Duke of Berry. In May, he again accompanied Richard II on an expedition to Ireland. When news reached them of that Bolingbroke had returned to England, Montagu was sent to Wales to raise opposing forces. When these deserted, Montagu advised King Richard to flee to Bordeaux. Instead, Richard was imprisoned, Henry took the throne and, in October, Montagu was arrested along with many of Richard's former councillors, and held in the Tower of London.

== Marriage and issue ==
He married Maud Fraunceys/Francis, widow of Sir Alan Buxhull KG, and a daughter of Sir Adam Fraunceys I (d.1374/5), a member of the Worshipful Company of Mercers, twice Lord Mayor of London (1352, 1353) and seven times a Member of Parliament for the City of London, "one of the richest and most powerful citizens of mid 14th-century London", lord of the manor of Edmonton, Middlesex. Her brother was Sir Adam Francis II (d.1417), of London and Edmonton, MP. By his wife he had three sons and three daughters:

- Thomas Montagu, 4th Earl of Salisbury (c. 1388–1428), who married firstly Eleanor Holland, a daughter of Thomas Holland, 2nd Earl of Kent (half-brother of King Richard II) by his wife Alice FitzAlan) and secondly Alice Chaucer by whom he had no issue. By his first wife he had issue:

- Alice Montagu, suo jure 5th Countess of Salisbury, only child and sole heiress, who married Richard Neville, jure uxoris 5th Earl of Salisbury. Alice's son was Richard Neville, 16th Earl of Warwick, 6th Earl of Salisbury ("Warwick the King-Maker"). Their daughter, Alice Neville, was great-grandmother to Catherine Parr, sixth wife to Henry VIII.

- Robert Montagu, who married Mary de Devon
- Richard Montagu (d. after 1400), who died unmarried and without issue. Some sources suggest he had a son, Edward Montagu, by Eleanor (Alianore) de Holand.
- Anne Montagu (d.1457), who married firstly (as his 2nd wife) Sir Richard Hankford (c. 1397 – 1431) of Annery, Monkleigh in Devon, feudal baron of Bampton in Devon. Their descendants include Anne Boleyn. After the death of Sir Richard, Anne married secondly Sir Lewis Johan by whom she had further issue, and thirdly, she married John Holland, 2nd Duke of Exeter by whom she had no issue.
- Margaret Montagu (d. before 1416), who married William Ferrers, 5th Baron Ferrers of Groby, without issue.
- Elizabeth Montagu (d. about 1448), who married Robert Willoughby, 6th Baron Willoughby de Eresby, by whom she had one daughter, Joan Willoughby, suo jure 7th Baroness Willoughby de Eresby.

== Downfall and death ==
Montagu had to answer charges related to the arrest and subsequent death of the Duke of Gloucester in 1397. Eventually, he was released, due to the intercession of King Henry's sister Elizabeth, Countess of Huntingdon. Not long after his release, Montagu joined with the Earl of Huntingdon and a group of other barons in the Epiphany Rising, a plot to kill King Henry IV and restore Richard II. After the plot failed, mob violence ensued, and he was caught by a mob of townspeople at Cirencester, held without trial, and executed by beheading on 7 January 1400. His eldest son, Thomas – by Maud Francis daughter of London citizen, Adam Francis – eventually recovered the Earldom, though the attainder against John Montagu was not reversed until the accession of Edward IV in 1461.

== Notes ==
- Hunt, William (1894). "Montacute, John de" . In Lee, Sidney (ed.). Dictionary of National Biography. Vol. 38. London: Smith, Elder & Co. pp. 205–206.

Peerage of England
Preceded by William Montagu	Earl of Salisbury, Baron Montagu; 1397–1400 (Forfeit)	Succeeded by Thomas Montagu (Restored 1421)
Preceded by John de Montagu with Margaret de Monthermer	Baron Montagu, Baron Monthermer c. 1390–1400	Succeeded by Thomas Montagu (Restored 1421)
