= John Montagu, 1st Baron Montagu =

English nobleman (c. 1330–c. 1390)

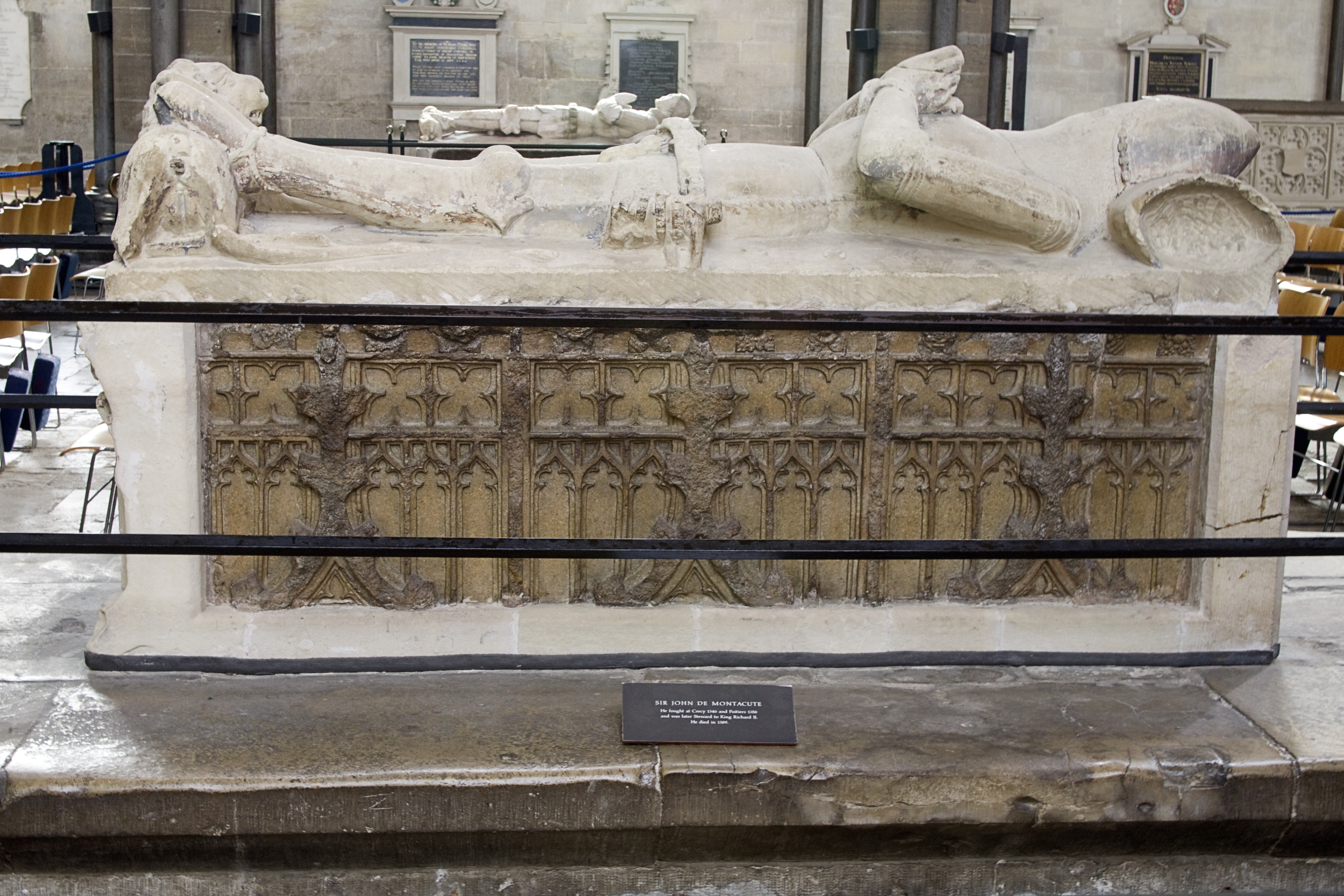
Baron Montagu's effigial monument in Salisbury Cathedral

John de Montacute (c. 1330 – c. 1390) was a 14th-century English nobleman and loyal servant of King Edward III. He was the son of William Montagu, 1st Earl of Salisbury by his wife Catherine Grandison, and younger brother of William de Montacute, 2nd Earl of Salisbury (1328–1397). He also had several younger sisters.

Montacute was summoned to parliament in 1357. Jean Froissart named "Lord John Mountacute" as one of the participants with King Edward III at the Siege of Calais in 1349.

He married Margaret de Monthermer, daughter and heiress of Thomas de Monthermer, 2nd Baron de Monthermer by his wife Margaret de Brewes. Their children included John Montacute, 3rd Earl of Salisbury (c. 1350 – 1400); Eleanor Montacute, who married John Dinham (1359–1428); Thomas Montagu, Dean of Salisbury Cathedral; and Sybil Montagu, Prioress of Amesbury.

Montagu's descendants quartered the arms of Monthermer: Or, an eagle displayed vert beaked and membered gules.
