= William Montagu, 2nd Earl of Salisbury =

William II of Mann
- Earl of Salisbury; Baron Montagu
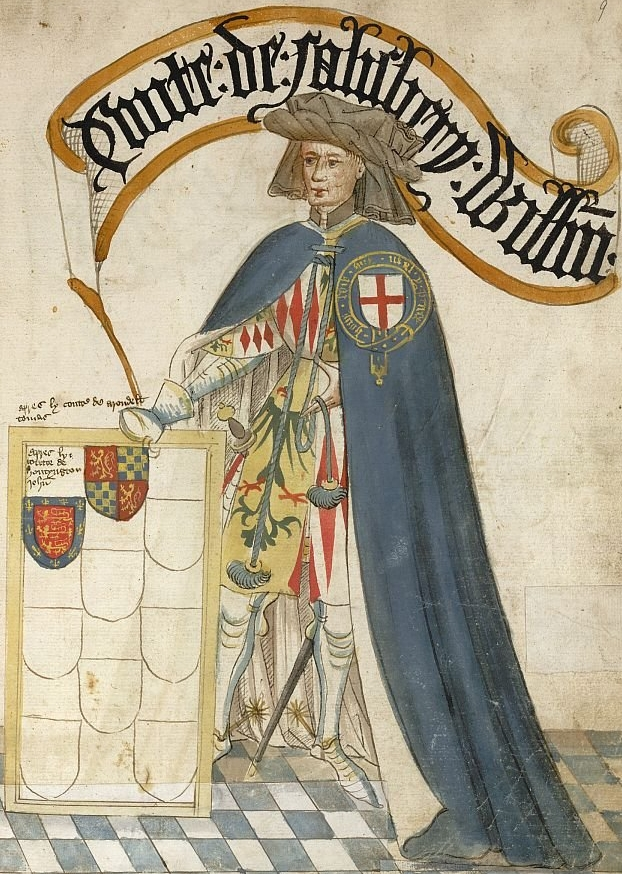
- "Conte de Salisbery, Will(ia)m", William de Montagu, 2nd Earl of Salisbury, KG, illustration from the Bruges Garter Book, c.1430. The arms of Monthermer (Or, an eagle displayed vert beaked and membered gules) shown quartered by Montagu on his tabard are apparently incorrect, as it was his younger brother John de Montagu, 1st Baron Montagu (c. 1330 – c. 1390) who married the Monthermer heiress.

King of Mann
- Reign: 30 January 1344 – 3 June 1397
- Predecessor: William Montagu, 1st Earl of Salisbury
- Successor: William le Scrope, 1st Earl of Wiltshire
- Born: 25 June 1328; Donyatt, Somerset, England
- Died: 3 June 1397 (aged 68)
- Spouse: Joan of Kent; Elizabeth de Mohun
- Father: William Montagu, 1st Earl of Salisbury
- Mother: Catherine Grandison

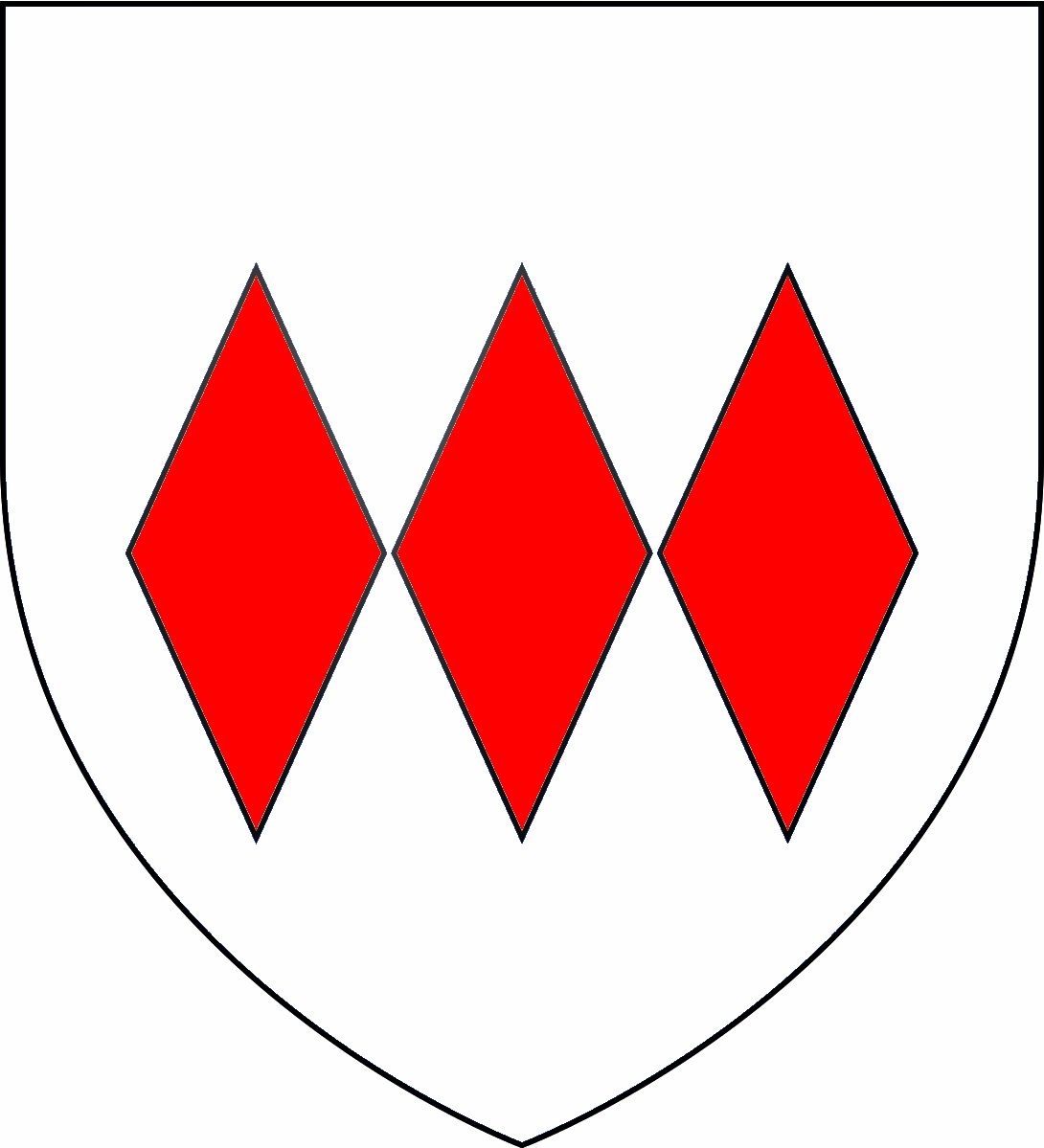
Arms of Montagu: Argent, three fusils conjoined in fess gules

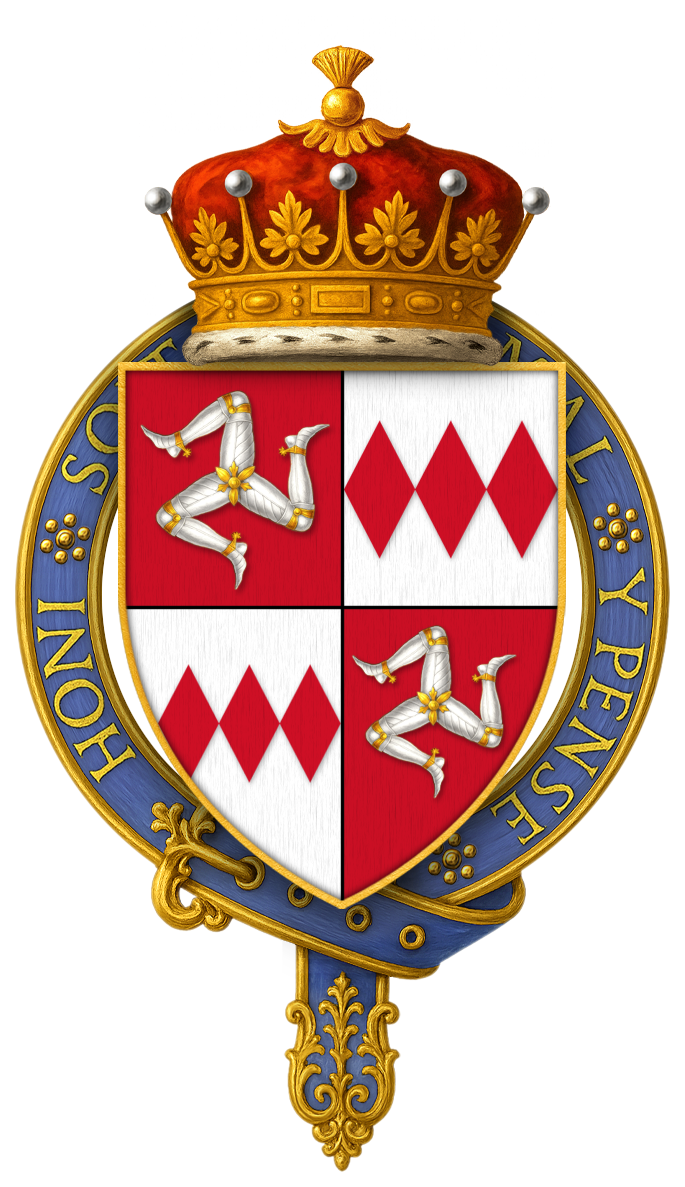
Arms of Sir William Montagu, 2nd Earl of Salisbury, KG, quartering Mann

William Montagu, 2nd Earl of Salisbury, 4th Baron Montagu, King of Mann, KG (25 June 1328 – 3 June 1397) was an English nobleman and commander in the English army during King Edward III's French campaigns in the Hundred Years War. He was one of the Founder Knights of the Order of the Garter.

He was the second king of an independent Manx Kingdom.

== Biography ==
Lord Salisbury was born in Donyatt in Somerset, the eldest son of William Montagu, 1st Earl of Salisbury and his wife Catherine Grandison. One of his sisters, Philippa (d. 5 January 1382) was the wife of Roger Mortimer, 2nd Earl of March. In 1344 upon the death of his father, Lord Salisbury succeeded to the titles of earl and of King of Mann. On 13 July 1346, he was made a Knight Bachelor. In 1348, Lord Salisbury, at this time married to the King's first cousin, was one of the knights admitted at the foundation of the Order of the Garter.

=== First marriage ===
In the early 1340s, Lord Salisbury was married to Joan of Kent, a first cousin of the King, and a princess of England. Both Lord Salisbury and his bride were of exactly the same age, and both were in their early teens. Lord Salisbury entered into the marriage in good faith, without knowing that Joan had already, at the age of twelve, secretly married Thomas Holland, just before the latter left England on crusade. Upon returning to England in 1348, Holland declared that Joan was his wife and demanded that she be restored to him. An inquiry was instituted to examine the question, and it found that Joan had indeed been married to Holland, and that that marriage was valid in law; consequently, Lord Salisbury's own marriage to Joan was invalid. Lord Salisbury attempted to disrupt the proceedings by interfering with Joan's representatives and holding her captive so that she could not testify. Salisbury only released Joan after a second petition by Holland and the Church ordered Salisbury to do so. Joan testified she had consented to her marriage to Holland and it had been consummated. Following the findings of the inquiry, Lord Salisbury's marriage with Joan, Fair Maid of Kent, was annulled by the Pope in 1349. It is not known if Salisbury and Joan ever lived together during the years of their marriage for no records exist.

=== Military career ===
Lord Salisbury, by now twenty-one years of age, was showing signs of becoming a successful military commander. Despite the fiasco of his marriage with a member of the royal family, Lord Salisbury rose rapidly in the ranks of the army upon the strength of his own competence. He served as a commander of the English forces in France in many of the following years, including as commander of the rear guard of Edward the Black Prince's army in 1355, and again at the Battle of Poitiers in 1356, and further serving in 1357, 1359 and 1360. Later in 1360, he was one of the commissioners who negotiated the Treaty of Brétigny.

The treaty led to a period of tranquillity, during which time Lord Salisbury served on the king's council, working closely with King Edward III. In October 1361, the Edward the Black Prince married Lord Salisbury's former wife Joan. Lord Salisbury returned to the field in 1369, serving in John of Gaunt's expedition to northern France, and then in other raids and expeditions, and on some commissions that attempted to negotiate truces with the French. Lord Salisbury helped Richard II put down the rebellion of Wat Tyler. In 1385, he accompanied Richard II on his Scottish expedition.

In 1392–3, Lord Salisbury sold the Lordship of the Isle of Man to William le Scrope of Bolton.

=== Second marriage ===
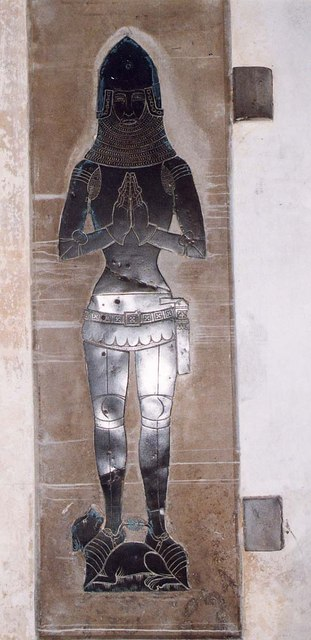
Monumental brass of Sir William Salisbury (d.1383), All Saints' parish church, Calbourne, Isle of Wight

Lord Salisbury married Elizabeth, daughter of John de Mohun, 9th Lord de Mohun of Dunster. They had a son and two daughters and lived at Bisham Manor in Berkshire. Their only son, Sir William Salisbury married Lady Elizabeth FitzAlan, daughter of Richard Fitzalan, 11th Earl of Arundel, but was killed in a tournament in 1383, leaving no children. Therefore, when Lord Salisbury died in 1397, the earldom was inherited by his nephew, John Montagu, 3rd Earl of Salisbury.

== Notes ==
Peerage of England
Preceded by William I de Montacute	Earl of Salisbury, Baron Montacute; 1344–1397	Succeeded by John Montacute
Head of State of the Isle of Man
Preceded by William I de Montacute	King of Mann; 1344–1392	Succeeded by William le Scrope
