= Ralph de Monthermer, 1st Baron Monthermer =

English nobleman (c. 1270–1325)

Arms of Monthermer: Or, an eagle displayed vert beaked and membered gules.

Ralph de Monthermer, 1st Baron Monthermer (c. 1270 – 5 April 1325), between 1297 and 1307 jure uxoris Earl of Gloucester and Earl of Hertford, and between 1306 and 1307 also 1st Earl of Atholl, was an English nobleman, who was the son-in-law of King Edward I. His clandestine marriage to the King's widowed daughter Joan greatly offended her father, but he was quickly persuaded to pardon Ralph.

== Biography ==
Of unknown parentage, Monthermer was born in Wales. Before 1296, he was a squire in the service of Gilbert de Clare, Earl of Gloucester and Hertford and his wife Joan of Acre, the daughter of Edward I. After Gloucester's death in 1295, the widowed countess fell in love with Monthermer, and after inducing her father to knight him, secretly married him in January 1297. When she was forced to reveal the marriage in April, the King was enraged, and had Monthermer imprisoned at Bristol. Thomas Walsingham relates that, while pleading for her husband, Joan told her father "No one sees anything wrong if a great earl marries a poor and lowly woman. Why should there be anything wrong if a countess marries a young and promising man?" With the intervention of Anthony Beck, Bishop of Durham, Edward relented, and released Monthermer from prison in August 1297. Monthermer then paid homage to Edward at Eltham Palace and was formally recognised as jure uxoris Earl of Gloucester and Hertford.

In September 1297, Monthermer was summoned to attend a military council at Rochester, and would go on to take an active part in the Wars of Scottish Independence. He fought at the Battle of Falkirk in July 1298, and in the December of that year was granted the sum of £1,538 6s. 8d., to pay for 100 barbed horses for use in the war.

In 1300, Monthermer fought with his father-in-law at the siege of Caerlaverock. The Caerlaverock Roll, a poetic description of all the lords and knights present, refers to him thus (as translated from the original French):

He by whom they were well supported,
Who brought to success the love,
After great doubts and fears,
Until it pleased God he should be relieved,
For the Countess of Gloucester,
For whom he long endured great sufferings.
Of fine gold with three red chevrons,
He had there only a banner; (Note: The banner "of fine gold with three red chevrons" was the banner of the de Clare family, which Monthermer evidently bore to show his position as Earl of Gloucester and Hertford.)
Yet he made no bad appearance,
When he was attired in his own arms,
Which were yellow with a green eagle.
His name was Ralph de Monthermer.

== Scottish wars ==
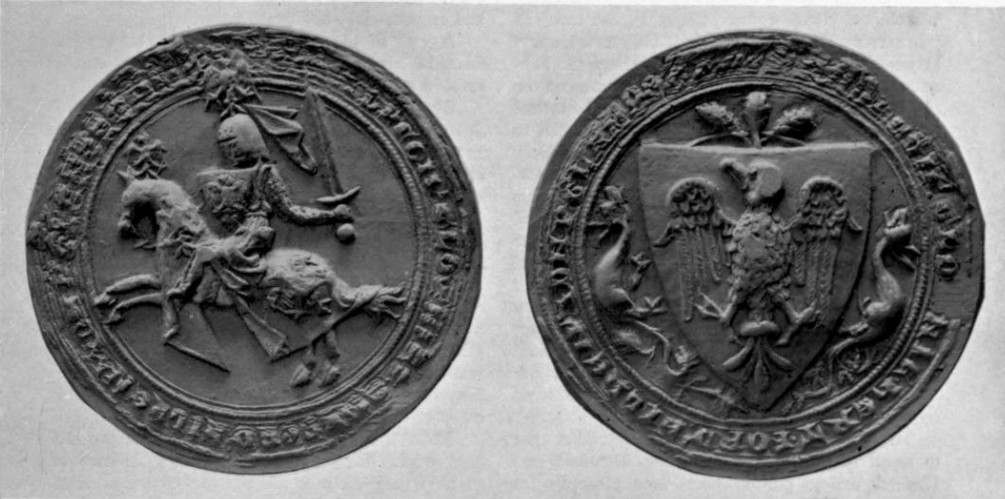
Lord Monthermer's seal, as appended to the Barons' Letter of 1301, which was written to the Pope by the nobles of England, rejecting his claim to the feudal overlordship of Scotland

In February 1301, Monthermer was summoned to a parliament at Lincoln, specially convened for the purpose of composing the Barons' Letter of 1301, which rejected Pope Boniface VIII's claim to the feudal overlordship of Scotland. On 24 June, he was summoned to Carlisle to serve with the Prince of Wales in the war against Scotland, and he was again summoned in 1303, 1304 and 1306. In the October of the latter year, King Edward conferred upon him the lands of Annandale in Scotland, as well as the earldom of Atholl; he later resigned the earldom to David Strathbogie, the son of the old Earl of Atholl, in exchange for the sum of 10,000 marks. In the winter he served as one of the king's three wardens in Scotland, and was besieged in Ayr Castle.

In 1305 Monthermer warned Robert the Bruce, then at the English court, of the danger posed by King Edward. During a convivial evening, Edward had let slip that he intended to arrest Bruce the next morning. Monthermer warned Bruce by sending him the sum of twelve pence and a pair of spurs. Bruce took the hint and he and his squire quickly departed the English court for Scotland. After the Battle of Bannockburn in 1314, at which Monthermer fought and was captured, Robert, now the victorious King of Scots, discharged the debt by releasing Ralph without ransom, but not before first entertaining him at table. Marmaduke Lord Thweng, also captured, joined them and was also then released without ransom.

== Later life ==
His wife Joan died in 1307 at the manor of Clare in Suffolk, aged thirty-five. Her cause of death is not known for certain, but she probably died in childbirth. After her death, Monthermer lost his earldoms— which he had held by right of his wife—to Gilbert de Clare, the son of the old Earl of Gloucester and Hertford. However, in 1309, King Edward II summoned him to parliament as a baron, under the title of Lord Monthermer. In 1308 Monthermer brought a lawsuit against Richard de Beresford, Treasurer of Ireland, claiming that Richard was unlawfully in possession of most of the Irish property which should have come to Monthermer on Joan's death. His claim was successful.

In 1307 Monthermer was appointed keeper of Cardiff Castle and other castles in Wales, and from 1311 to 1312 he again served as warden in Scotland, for which he was paid 300 marks. In 1315 he was made warden of the royal forests south of the Trent, an office he continued to hold until 1320. In December 1315 he went on a pilgrimage to the Way of St James, during which time he appointed a deputy to carry out his duties in England.

His second wife was Isabel le Despencer, the widow of Lord Hastings and a daughter of the Earl of Winchester, whom he married around 1313, also in secret; for this further transgression, he was not pardoned until 1319. Ralph Lord Monthermer died in or before 1325, aged around 55, while his widow died in 1336.

== Issue ==
By his first wife Joan, Monthermer probably had two sons and two daughters:

- Mary de Monthermer (October 1297 - c. 1371), married Duncan, Earl of Fife
- Joan de Monthermer (1299 - unknown), became a nun at Amesbury.
- Thomas, 2nd Lord Monthermer (1301–1340)
- Edward de Monthermer (1304–1340), fought in the Scottish campaign in 1335, but spent much of his life in service to his half-sister Elizabeth, who provided for him during his last illness and buried him next to their mother

Peerage of England
New creation	Baron Monthermer; 1309–1325	Succeeded by Thomas de Monthermer
