= The Countess of Salisbury (novel) =

1836 novel by Alexandre Dumas

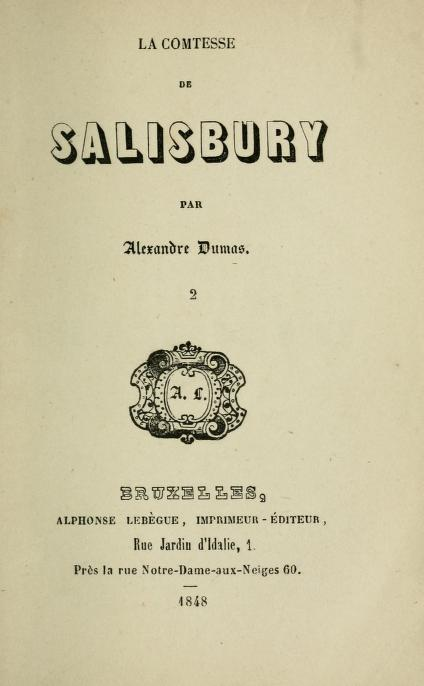
- 1848 edition
- Author: Alexandre Dumas
- Original title: Chroniques de France. La Comtesse de Salisbury
- Language: French
- Genre: Historical novel
- Publisher: La Presse (serial); Dumont (book)
- Publication date: 1836 (serial); 1839 (book)
- Publication place: France
- English publication date: 1840
- Media type: Print

The Countess of Salisbury (French: La Comtesse de Salisbury) is a historical novel by the French writer Alexandre Dumas, first published in French as a serial in 1836 and then issued in book form in 1839 under the title Chroniques de France. La Comtesse de Salisbury.

The novel appeared in the feuilleton section of La Presse, a newspaper that used serial fiction to increase its number of subscribers. It has been described as one of the first examples of the French roman-feuilleton and as the first roman-feuilleton of La Presse.

The plot connects Edward III of England and the Countess of Salisbury with the legend of the foundation of the Order of the Garter, a story already treated in narrative and dramatic works before Dumas. Harry A. Spurr judged the novel less compact than other works by Dumas, while later analyses of the feuilleton have emphasized its use of narrative suspense between instalments.

== Publication ==
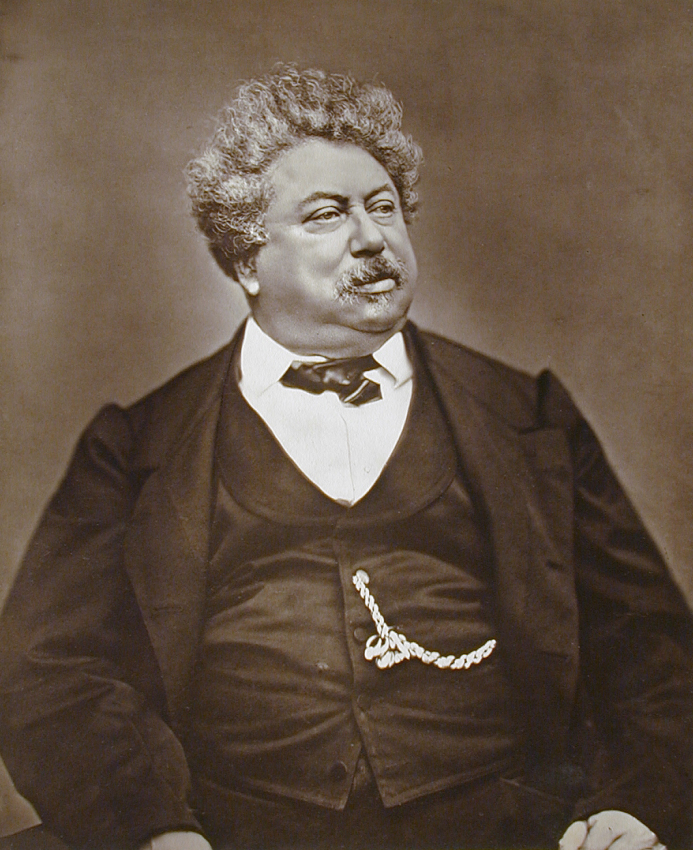
Alexandre Dumas in a photographic portrait by Étienne Carjat.

On 15 July 1836, La Presse published the "Introduction à nos feuilletons historiques", later reused as the preface to the first book edition. The contract with Émile de Girardin gave Dumas the Sunday-morning feuilleton for a series of historical scenes devoted to the main reigns in French history, beginning with Philippe de Valois.

The first episode appeared on 17 July 1836 under the title Règnes de Philippe VI de France et d'Édouard III d'Angleterre. 1338-1350. Le vœu du héron; publication continued every Sunday until 11 September 1836, for a total of eight feuilletons. The eight feuilletons formed the first sixteen chapters of the later La Comtesse de Salisbury, about half of the novel.

The first French book edition appeared in Paris in 1839 under the title Chroniques de France. La Comtesse de Salisbury. The Bibliographie de la France described it as two octavo volumes, printed in Paris by Dondey-Dupré and published by Dumont at the Palais-Royal. The two volumes took up and continued the episodes published in La Presse.

A pirated edition by Méline, Cans et Cie appeared in Brussels in 1839. In 1840, Bentley published an English translation in London as The Countess of Salisbury: To which is added The Maid of Corinth, translated from the French by E. R. M. and issued in three volumes. A New York edition followed in 1851 under the title The Countesse de Salisbury: A Chronicle of the Order of the Garter, published by Stringer & Townsend.

The work was later published in its definitive version in six volumes, issued in Paris by Alexandre Cadot in 1848. The scene of the garter was already present in the Paris edition of 1839. The preface to the 1839 edition also placed Dumas in relation to Walter Scott, Madame de Genlis and Sophie Ristaud Cottin.

== Background ==
The story of Edward III and the Countess of Salisbury had already been treated before Dumas in prose fiction and theatre. Earlier examples include the French novella La Comtesse de Salisbury, ou l'Ordre de la Jaretière of 1682, its English translation of 1683, Gresset's tragedy Édouard III of 1740, Fabre d'Églantine's play Isabelle de Salisbury of 1791 and the novel Édouard et Elfride, ou la Comtesse de Salisbury of 1816. Dumas's novel also draws on the connection between Edward III, the Countess of Salisbury and the foundation of the Order of the Garter.

== Plot ==
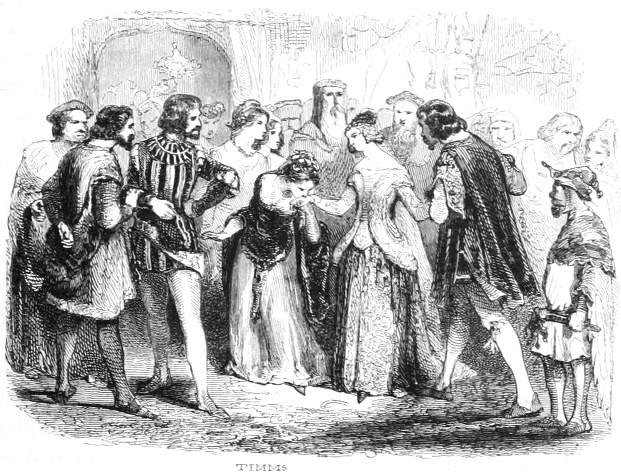
The Countess of Salisbury and the knights of Edward III pay homage to Joan of Flanders, illustration from Jules Janin's La Bretagne, 1844.

On 25 September 1338, in the Palace of Westminster, Edward III presides over a banquet with Queen Philippa of Hainault, the Earl of Salisbury, Alix and Robert III of Artois. Robert enters the hall carrying a heron, provokes the king before the guests and sets in motion the episode of the vow of the heron. At the English court, Alix is betrothed to the Earl of Salisbury and is also the confidante of Queen Philippa. Bound to the earl by a vow, she awaits his return to England after his passage into France.

While the Earl of Salisbury is a prisoner in Paris, Edward declares his love to Alix. Alix rejects the king by invoking the fidelity owed to her husband; Edward, determined to bring the earl back to England, orders a letter to be prepared for David Bruce and arranges the exchange of the Earl of Moray for the Earl of Salisbury. Once back in England, the Earl of Salisbury is soon recalled to London by Edward, who also invites Alix to the festivities at Windsor. William Montagu, now dying, warns Alix of the danger posed by the king's love and asks her to leave.

Edward returns to Alix and renews his passion; she reveals that she has poisoned herself, asks him to repeat her last words to the Earl of Salisbury and dies while pronouncing her husband's name. After Alix's death, Edward faces the Battle of Crécy and the siege of Calais, down to the final days of his reign. When the king lies on his deathbed, the Earl of Salisbury appears as the hermit of Wark Castle and grants him forgiveness. Immediately afterwards, addressing those present, he announces Edward's death.

== Characters ==
Edward III of England

King of England, he presides over the banquet at Westminster, receives Robert d'Artois's provocation and falls in love with Alix.

Alix, Countess of Salisbury

Wife of the Earl of Salisbury and confidante of Queen Philippa, she refuses Edward's love.

Earl of Salisbury

A nobleman close to Edward, husband of Alix, prisoner in Paris and later hermit of Wark Castle.

Robert d'Artois

A French nobleman in exile, he introduces the episode of the vow of the heron at the banquet of Westminster.

== Reception and analysis ==
In its first serial publication the novel appeared under the title Règnes de Philippe VI de France et d'Édouard III d'Angleterre. 1338-1350. Le vœu du héron. In 1836 La Presse and Le Siècle reduced the annual subscription price to forty francs, compared with eighty francs for traditional daily newspapers; novels and short fiction in the feuilleton helped to increase the number of subscribers, together with advertising. In those years The Countess of Salisbury was one of the first romans-feuilletons and has also been identified as the first feuilleton-roman of La Presse.

The Countess of Salisbury has been linked to Dumas's later adventure novels through the pace of its war narrative. In 1839 Charles Augustin Sainte-Beuve criticized "industrial literature" in the Revue des Deux Mondes, attacking the growth of writing shaped by the market, newspapers, advertising and the new reading public. In 1902 Harry A. Spurr judged La Comtesse de Salisbury less readable than other novels by Dumas: after an effective first chapter, the characters reappear only at intervals in long historical passages, producing a mixture of narrative and history that Spurr considered unsuccessful.

The Countess of Salisbury belongs to the first phase of the French roman-feuilleton, placed between 1836 and 1850 and associated with writers such as Eugène Sue, Alexandre Dumas and Honoré de Balzac. In this phase, the genre made use of historical and social narrative, idealized heroes, serial publication, recapitulations, sharply contrasted characters and the interruption of a scene at a moment of suspense. In the first chapter, Le Vœu du Héron, Robert d'Artois pushes Edward III toward war against France by recalling his dynastic rights to the French crown; the instalment ends with the announced arrival of a messenger from Flanders, without revealing the content of the news. The formula la suite à demain signalled the deferral to the following instalment; the same device has been compared with the structure of the opening chapter of The Three Musketeers.

== Editions ==
- Chroniques de France. La Comtesse de Salisbury (in French). Vol. 1–2. Paris: Dumont. 1839.
- La Comtesse de Salisbury (in French). Vol. 1–6. Paris: Alexandre Cadot. 1848.
- Acté ; Les deux Diane ; La Comtesse de Salisbury. Œuvres complètes d'Alexandre Dumas (in French). Vol. 13. Paris: Au bureau du Siècle. 1856. ICCU CFI1113963.
- La Comtesse de Salisbury (in French). Vol. 1. Paris: Michel Lévy frères. 1856.
- La Comtesse de Salisbury (in French). Vol. 2. Paris: Michel Lévy frères. 1856.
- La Comtesse de Salisbury (in French). Vol. 1. Paris: Michel Lévy frères. 1861. ICCU NAP0519892.
- La Comtesse de Salisbury (in French). Vol. 2. Paris: Michel Lévy frères. 1861. ICCU NAP0519893.
- La Comtesse de Salisbury (in French). Vol. 1. Paris: Calmann Lévy. 1878. ICCU LO12078136.
- La Comtesse de Salisbury (in French). Vol. 1. Paris: Calmann Lévy. 1899. ICCU RAV1792199.
- La Comtesse de Salisbury (in French). Vol. 2. Paris: Calmann Lévy. 1899. ICCU RAV1792209.
- Aziza, Claude, ed. (2006). La Comtesse de Salisbury. Les romans sur l'Antiquité et le Moyen âge d'Alexandre Dumas (in French). Paris: Les Belles Lettres. ISBN 978-2-251-44313-3. ICCU TSA1821628.

=== Translations ===
English

- The Countess of Salisbury. To which is added The Maid of Corinth. Vol. 1–3. Translated by E. R. M. London: Richard Bentley. 1840.
- The Countesse de Salisbury. A Chronicle of the Order of the Garter. New York: Stringer & Townsend. 1851.

Spanish

- La Condesa de Salisbury (in Spanish). Translated by del Castillo, Florencio M. Mexico City: Imprenta de V. García Torres. 1852.
- Eduardo III, novela. Continuacion de La Condesa de Salisbury (in Spanish). Translated by del Castillo, Florencio M. Mexico City: Imprenta de V. García Torres. 1852.
- La condesa de Salisbury. Epopeyas (in Spanish). Buenos Aires: Editorial Liding. 1979.

Italian

- La contessa di Salisbury: romanzo storico (in Italian). Vol. 1–2. Translated by Grillenzoni, Ferdinando. Milan: Tipografia e libreria Pirotta e C. 1840. ICCU LO11363898.
- La contessa di Salisbury: romanzo storico (in Italian). Translated by Grillenzoni, Ferdinando. Naples: Gaetano Nobile libraio-editore. 1843. ICCU MO10000514.
- La contessa di Salisbury (in Italian). Vol. 1–3. Translated by Aureggio, Gaspare. Milan: Libreria di Dante. 1856. ICCU LO10911285.
- Edoardo 3.: romanzo storico (in Italian). Vol. 1–4. Translated by Cafferecci, Carlo Zanobi. Naples: Stamperia del Fibreno. 1857.

Polish

- Hrabina Salisbury i Edward III: romans historyczny (in Polish). Vol. 1–4. Warsaw. 1855.
- Hrabina Salisbury i Edward III: romans historyczny w 4 tomach (in Polish). Gródek Jagielloński: J. Czaiński. 1908.
- Hrabina Salisbury i Edward III. Kolekcja Hachette: Aleksander Dumas (in Polish). Vol. 1. Warsaw: Hachette Polska. 2015. ISBN 978-83-7849-283-2.
- Hrabina Salisbury i Edward III. Kolekcja Hachette: Aleksander Dumas (in Polish). Vol. 2. Warsaw: Hachette Polska. 2015. ISBN 978-83-7849-284-9.

== Sources ==
- Bellot, Marina (12 May 2016). "Alexandre Dumas, magnat de la presse". RetroNews (in French). Bibliothèque nationale de France.
- Cazani Júnior, Luís Enrique (2020). "La suite à demain: gancho, folhetim e o romance-folhetim A Condesssa de Salisbury". Ação Midiática - Estudos em Comunicação, Sociedade e Cultura (in Portuguese). 1 (19): 167–188. doi:10.5380/2238-0701.2019n19-09.
- Dumas, Alexandre (1856). La Comtesse de Salisbury (in French). Vol. 1. Paris: Michel Lévy frères.
- Dumas, Alexandre (1861). La Comtesse de Salisbury (in French). Vol. 2. Paris: M. Lévy.
- Jurt, Joseph (2013). "Le siècle de la presse et de la littérature en France". Romanistische Zeitschrift für Literaturgeschichte (in French). 37 (3–4): 275–305.
- Maxwell, Richard (2012). The Historical Novel in Europe, 1650–1950. Cambridge: Cambridge University Press. ISBN 978-0-521-51967-0.
- Moeglin, Jean-Marie (2019). "Le viol de la comtesse de Salisbury. À propos d'un récit du chroniqueur Jean Le Bel". Comptes rendus des séances de l'Académie des inscriptions et belles-lettres (in French). 163 (2): 639–668. doi:10.3406/crai.2019.96857.
- Moeglin, Jean-Marie (2022). Édouard III, le viol de la comtesse de Salisbury et la fondation de l'ordre de la Jarretière (in French). Paris: Presses Universitaires de France. ISBN 978-2-13-083346-8.
- Pearson, Roger (2021). The Beauty of Baudelaire: The Poet as Alternative Lawgiver. Oxford: Oxford University Press. ISBN 978-0-19-284331-9.
- Sainte-Beuve, Charles-Augustin (1839). "De la littérature industrielle". Revue des Deux Mondes (in French). 19: 675–691.
- Spurr, Harry A. (1902). The Life and Writings of Alexandre Dumas. New York: Frederick A. Stokes Company.
- Trigg, Stephanie (2012). Shame and Honor: A Vulgar History of the Order of the Garter. Philadelphia: University of Pennsylvania Press. ISBN 978-0-8122-4436-6.
