= Joan of Acre =

English princess and noblewoman (1272–1307)

- Countess of Hertford; Countess of Gloucester
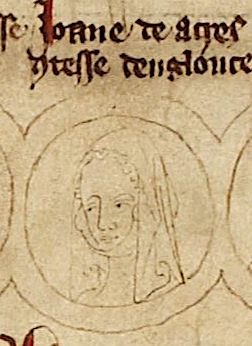
- Born: April 1272; Acre, Kingdom of Acre
- Died: 23 April 1307 (aged 35); Clare Castle, Clare, England
- Burial: 26 April 1307; Clare Priory, Suffolk, England
- Spouse: Gilbert de Clare, 7th Earl of Gloucester, 6th Earl of Hertford (m. 1290; died 1295) Sir Ralph de Monthermer (m. 1297)
- Issue: Gilbert de Clare, 7th Earl of Hertford; Eleanor de Clare; Margaret de Clare; Elizabeth de Clare; Mary de Monthermer; Joan de Monthermer; Thomas de Monthermer, 2nd Baron Monthermer; Edward de Monthermer
- House: Plantagenet
- Father: Edward I of England
- Mother: Eleanor of Castile

Joan of Acre (April 1272 – 23 April 1307) was an English princess, a daughter of Edward I of England and Eleanor of Castile. The name "Acre" derives from her birthplace in the Holy Land while her parents were on a crusade.

She was married twice; her first husband was Gilbert de Clare, 7th Earl of Gloucester, one of the most powerful nobles in her father's kingdom; her second husband was Ralph de Monthermer, a squire in her household whom she married in secret.

Joan is most notable for the claim that miracles have allegedly taken place at her grave, and for the multiple references to her in literature.

== Birth and childhood ==
Joan (or Joanna, as she is sometimes called) of Acre was born in the spring of 1272 in the Kingdom of Acre, Outremer, now in modern Israel, while her parents, Edward I and Eleanor of Castile, were on crusade. At the time of Joan's birth, her grandfather, Henry III, was still alive and thus her father was not yet king of England. Her parents departed from Acre shortly after her birth, travelling to Sicily and Spain before leaving Joan with Eleanor's mother, Joan, Countess of Ponthieu, in France. Joan lived for several years in France where she spent her time being educated by a bishop and "being thoroughly spoiled by an indulgent grandmother." Joan was free to play among the "vine clad hills and sunny vales" surrounding her grandmother's home, although she required "judicious surveillance."

As Joan was growing up with her grandmother, her father was back in England, already arranging marriages for his daughter. He hoped to gain both political power and more wealth with his daughter's marriage, so he conducted the arrangement in a very "business-like style". He finally found a man suitable to marry Joan (aged 5 at the time), Hartman, son of King Rudolf I of Germany. Edward then brought her home from France for the first time to meet him. As she had spent her entire life away from Edward and Eleanor, when she returned she "stood in no awe of her parents" and had a fairly distanced relationship with them.

Before he was able to meet or marry Joan, Hartman died. It was reported that he had fallen through a patch of shallow ice while "amusing himself in skating" while a letter sent to the King himself stated that Hartman had set out on a boat to visit his father amidst a terrible fog and the boat had smashed into a rock, drowning him.

== First marriage ==
Edward arranged a second marriage almost immediately after the death of Hartman. Gilbert de Clare, Earl of Gloucester, who was almost 30 years older than Joan and newly divorced, was his first choice. The earl resigned his lands to Edward upon agreeing to get them back when he married Joan, as well as agreed on a dower of 2,000 silver marks. By the time all of these negotiations were finished, Joan was 12 years old. Gilbert de Clare became very enamoured with Joan, and even though she had to marry him regardless of how she felt, he still tried to woo her. He bought her expensive gifts and clothing to try to win favour with her. The couple were married 30 April 1290 at Westminster Abbey, and had four children together. They were:

1. Gilbert de Clare, 7th Earl of Hertford
2. Eleanor de Clare
3. Margaret de Clare
4. Elizabeth de Clare

Joan's first husband, Gilbert de Clare, died on 7 December 1295.

== Secret second marriage ==
Joan had been a widow for a little over a year when she caught the eye of Ralph de Monthermer, a squire in Joan's father's household. Joan fell in love and convinced her father to have Monthermer knighted. It was unheard of in European royalty for a noble lady to even converse with a man who had not won or acquired importance in the household. However, Joan secretly married Ralph in January 1297. Joan's father was already planning another marriage for Joan to Amadeus V, Count of Savoy, to occur on 16 March 1297. Being already married, unbeknownst to her father, Joan was in a dangerous predicament.

Joan sent her four young children to their grandfather, in hopes that their sweetness would win Edward's favor, but her plan did not work. The king soon discovered his daughter's intentions, but not yet aware that she had already committed to them, he seized Joan's lands and continued to arrange her marriage to Amadeus of Savoy. Soon after the seizure of her lands, Joan told her father that she had married Ralph. The king was enraged and retaliated by immediately imprisoning Monthermer at Bristol Castle. The people of the land had differing opinions on Joan's predicament. It has been argued that the noblemen who were most upset were those who wanted her hand in marriage.

With regard to the matter, Joan famously said, "It is not considered ignominious, nor disgraceful, for a great earl to take a poor and mean woman to wife; neither, on the other hand, is it worthy of blame, or too difficult a thing for a countess to promote to honour a gallant youth." Coming at the time of a pregnancy which may have been obvious, Joan's statement seemed to soften Edward's attitude towards the situation. Her first child by Monthermer was born in October 1297; by the summer of 1297, when the marriage was revealed to the king, Joan's condition would certainly have been apparent, helping to convince Edward that he had no choice but to recognise his daughter's second marriage. Edward I eventually relented, for the sake of his daughter, and released Monthermer from imprisonment in August 1297. Monthermer paid homage on 2 August, was granted the titles of Earl of Gloucester and Earl of Hertford, and rose in the King's favour during Joan's lifetime.

Joan and Monthermer had four children:

1. Mary de Monthermer, born October 1297. In 1306 her grandfather King Edward I arranged for her to marry Duncan Macduff, 8th Earl of Fife.
2. Joan de Monthermer, born 1299, became a nun at Amesbury
3. Thomas de Monthermer, 2nd Baron Monthermer, born 1301
4. Edward de Monthermer, born 1304 and died 1339

== Relationship with family ==
Joan was the seventh of Edward I and Eleanor's fourteen children. Most of her elder siblings died before the age of seven, and many of her younger siblings died before adulthood. Those who survived to adulthood were Joan, her younger brother, Edward of Caernarfon (later Edward II), and four of her sisters: Eleanor, Margaret, Mary, and Elizabeth.

Joan, like her siblings, was raised outside her parents' household. She lived with her grandmother in Ponthieu for four years, and was then entrusted to the same caregivers who looked after her siblings. Edward I did not have a close relationship with most of his children while they were growing up, yet "he seemed fonder of his daughters than his sons".

However, Joan of Acre's independent nature caused numerous conflicts with her father. Her father disapproved of her leaving court after her marriage to the Earl of Gloucester, and in turn "seized seven robes that had been made for her". He also strongly disapproved of her second marriage to Ralph de Monthermer, a squire in her household, even to the point of attempting to force her to marry someone else. While Edward ultimately developed a cordial relationship with Monthermer, even granting him two earldoms, there appears to have been a notable difference in Edward's treatment of Joan as compared to the treatment of the rest of her siblings. For instance, her father famously paid messengers substantially when they brought news of the birth of grandchildren, but did not do this upon the birth of Joan's daughter.

Joan retained a fairly tight bond with her siblings. She and Monthermer both maintained a close relationship with her brother, Edward, which was maintained through letters. After Edward became estranged from his father and lost his royal seal, "Joan offered to lend him her seal".

== Death ==
Joan died 23 April 1307, at the manor of Clare in Suffolk. The cause of her death remains unclear, though one popular theory is that she died during childbirth, a common cause of death at the time. While Joan's age in 1307 (about 35) and the chronology of her earlier pregnancies with Ralph de Monthermer suggest that this could well be the case, historians have not confirmed the cause of her death.

Less than four months after her death, Joan's father died. Joan's widower, Ralph de Monthermer, lost the title of Earl of Gloucester soon after the deaths of his wife and father-in-law. The earldom of Gloucester was given to Joan's son from her first marriage, Gilbert, who was its rightful holder. Monthermer continued to hold a nominal earldom in Scotland, which had been conferred on him by Edward I, until his death.

Joan's burial place has been the cause of some interest and debate. She is interred in the Augustinian priory at Clare, which had been founded by her first husband's ancestors and where many of them were also buried. Allegedly, in 1357, Joan's daughter, Elizabeth De Burgh, claimed to have "inspected her mother's body and found the corpse to be intact", which in the eyes of the Roman Catholic Church is an indication of sanctity. This claim was only recorded in a fifteenth-century chronicle, however, and its details are uncertain, especially the statement that her corpse was in such a state of preservation that "when her paps [breasts] were pressed with hands, they rose up again." Some sources further claim that miracles took place at Joan's tomb, but no cause for her beatification or canonisation has ever been introduced.

== Joan in fiction ==
Joan of Acre makes an appearance in Virginia Henley's historical romance Infamous. In the book, Joan, known as Joanna, is described as a promiscuous young princess, vain, shallow and spoilt. In the novel she is only given one daughter, when she historically had eight children. There is no evidence that supports this picture of Joan.

In The Love Knot by Vanessa Alexander, Joan of Acre is an important character. The author portrays a completely different view of the princess from the one in Henley's novel. The Love Knot tells the story of the love affair between Ralph de Monthermer and Joan of Acre through the discovery of a series of letters the two had written to each other.

Between historians and novelists, Joan has appeared in various texts as either an independent and spirited woman or a spoiled brat. In Lives of the Princesses of England by Mary Anne Everett Green, Joan is portrayed as a "giddy princess" and neglectful mother. Many have agreed to this characterisation; however, some authors think there is little evidence to support the assumption that Joan of Acre was a neglectful or uncaring mother.

In Gracious Gift by Abiah Patterson, Joan is a mother figure to her younger siblings. After her marriage, she is kind and caring towards her children and step-children. She becomes interested in the political landscape of her father's kingdom.

== Ancestry ==
Ancestors of Joan of Acre

8. John of England
4. Henry III of England
9. Isabella of Angoulême
2. Edward I of England
10. Ramon Berenguer IV, Count of Provence
5. Eleanor of Provence
11. Beatrice of Savoy
1. Joan of Acre
12. Alfonso IX of León
6. Ferdinand III of Castile
13. Berenguela of Castile
3. Eleanor of Castile
14. Simon de Dammartin
7. Joan, Countess of Ponthieu
15. Marie, Countess of Ponthieu

== Bibliography ==
- Ailes, Adrian (2019). "Medieval Armorial Seals in The National Archives (UK)". In Whatley, Laura J. (ed.). A Companion to Seals in the Middle Ages. Brill. pp. 155–180.
- Carpenter, David (2004). The Struggle for Mastery: The Penguin History of Britain 1066–1284. London, UK: Penguin. ISBN 978-0-14-014824-4.
- Costain, Thomas. A History of the Plantagenets, Vol III.
- Durand, Ursin; Clémencet, Charles; Dantine, Maur-François (1818). L'art de verifier les dates des faits historiques, des chartes, des chroniques et autres anciens monuments depuis la naissance de notre-seigneur (in French). Vol. 12. Paris, France: n.p. OCLC 221519473.
- Green, Mary Anna Everett. Lives of the Princesses of England. London: Henry Colburn, 1850. Google Books full text
- Hamilton, J. S. (2010). The Plantagenets: History of a Dynasty. London, UK: Continuum. ISBN 978-1-4411-5712-6.
- Howell, Margaret (2004). "Eleanor [Eleanor of Provence] (c.1223–1291), queen of England, consort of Henry III". Oxford Dictionary of National Biography (online ed.). Oxford University Press. doi:10.1093/ref:odnb/8620. (Subscription, Wikipedia Library access or UK public library membership required.)
- Lee, Sidney, ed. (1892). "Joan of Acre" . Dictionary of National Biography. Vol. 29. London: Smith, Elder & Co. p. 390.
- O'Callaghan, Joseph F. (1975). A History of Medieval Spain. Ithaca, US: Cornell University Press. ISBN 978-0-8014-0880-9.
- Parsons, John Carmi. Eleanor of Castile. New York: St. Martin's Press, 1995.
- Parsons, John Carmi (2004). "Eleanor [Eleanor of Castile] (1241–1290), queen of England, consort of Edward I". Oxford Dictionary of National Biography (online ed.). Oxford University Press. doi:10.1093/ref:odnb/8619. (Subscription, Wikipedia Library access or UK public library membership required.)
- Patterson, Abiah (2024). Gracious Gift. Amazon Publishing. ISBN 979-8327886223.
- Prestwich, Michael (1988). Edward I. Berkeley, US and Los Angeles, US: University of California Press. ISBN 978-0-520-06266-5.
- Underhill, Frances Ann (1999). For Her Good Estate: The Life of Elizabeth de Burgh. New York: St. Martin's Press. ISBN 0-312-21355-7.
- Weir, Alison (2008). Britain's Royal Families, The Complete Genealogy. London: Vintage Books. ISBN 978-0-09-953973-5.
- Wilkinson, L. (2020). Royal Daughters and Diplomacy at the Court of Edward I. In A. King & A. Spencer (Eds.), Edward I: New Interpretations (pp. 84-104). Boydell & Brewer. https://doi.org/10.1017/9781787446144
